= Index of poker articles =

This is an alphabetical list of poker topics.

== 0–9 ==
- 2 Months 2 Million
- 888 Holdings

== A ==
- A. J. Benza
- Abe Mosseri
- Absolute Poker
- Aggression (poker)
- Alan Goehring
- Alex Brenes
- Alexandre Gomes
- Ali Eslami
- Ali Nejad
- Alma McClelland
- Almira Skripchenko
- Amnon Filippi
- Anders Henriksson (poker player)
- André Akkari
- Andre Boyer (poker player)
- Andreas Høivold
- Andy Black (poker player)
- Andy Frankenberger
- Annette Obrestad
- Annie Duke
- Anthony Reategui
- Antonio Esfandiari
- Artie Cobb
- Artworx
- Asian Poker Tour

== B ==
- Bad beat
- Baller Magazine
- Barbara Enright
- Barbara Freer
- Barny Boatman
- Barry Greenstein
- Barry Tompkins
- Berry Johnston
- Bertrand Grospellier
- Betfair
- Beth Shak
- Betsson
- Betting (poker)
- Betting in poker
- BetUS
- Big bet
- Big Deal: A Year as a Professional Poker Player
- Big Game (poker)
- Bigger Deal: A Year Inside the Poker Boom
- Bill Edler
- Bill Smith (poker player)
- Billy Argyros
- Billy Baxter (poker player)
- Blair Hinkle
- Blank expression
- Blind (poker)
- Blind man's bluff (poker)
- Blondie Forbes
- Bluff (poker)
- Bluff Magazine
- Bob Stupak
- Bobby Baldwin
- Boss Media
- Bounty (poker)
- Bourré
- Brandon Cantu
- Brent Musburger
- Bruno Fitoussi
- Bug (poker)
- Burn card
- Button (poker)
- Buying in (poker)
- Bwin.party digital entertainment
- Byron Wolford

== C ==
- Cake Network
- Calling station
- Card game
- Card Player
- Card room
- Cardroom
- CardRunners
- Cards speak
- Caribbean Stud Poker
- Carlos Mortensen
- Carolyn Gardner
- Carter Phillips
- Cash game
- Casino
- Casino game
- Casino hold 'em
- Casino token
- Caspar Berry
- Celebrity Poker Club
- Celebrity Poker Showdown
- Centrebet
- Cereus Poker Network
- Chad Brown (poker player)
- Cheating in poker
- Check-raise
- Chicago (poker card game)
- Chinese poker
- Chip race
- Chip Reese
- Chopping the blinds
- Chris Bell (poker player)
- Chris Karagulleyan
- Chris Rose
- Christer Johansson (poker player)
- Clonie Gowen
- Closed (poker)
- Cold deck
- Colette Doherty
- Colin Murray
- Community card poker
- Corky McCorquodale
- Counterfeit (poker)
- Courtney Friel
- Crown Australian Celebrity Poker Challenge
- Crown Australian Poker Championship
- CryptoLogic
- Curt Gowdy
- Cyndy Violette

== D ==
- Dag Mikkelsen
- Dan Harrington
- Dan Kelly (poker player)
- Daniel Alaei
- Daniel Negreanu
- Danny Nguyen
- Dario Alioto
- Darus Suharto
- Dave Foley
- Dave Ulliott
- Dave Welch (poker player)
- David Baxter (poker player)
- David Benyamine
- David Chiu (poker player)
- David Pomroy
- David Rheem
- David Sklansky
- David Williams (card player)
- Davidi Kitai
- Dead money (poker)
- Dealer's choice
- Deby Callihan
- Declaration (poker)
- Dee Luong
- Dewey Tomko
- Dick Van Patten
- Diego Cordovez
- Dogs Playing Poker
- Dominant Factor Test
- Domination (poker)
- Don Williams (poker player)
- Donna Ward
- Douglas Kim
- Doyle Brunson
- Doyles Room
- Draw (poker)
- Draw poker
- Duplicate poker

== E ==
- E! Hollywood Hold'em
- Eddy Scharf
- Eli Balas
- Eli Elezra
- Epic Poker League
- Eric Baldwin
- Eric Brenes
- Erick Lindgren
- Erik Friberg (poker player)
- Erik Seidel
- Erin Ness
- Eugene Katchalov
- European Poker Tour
- Evelyn Ng
- EverestPoker.com

== F ==
- Face the Ace
- Fish (poker)
- Five-card draw
- Five-card stud
- Fold equity
- Food Poker
- Four card poker
- Four flush
- Fred Goldberg
- Freddy Deeb
- Freeroll (poker)
- Full House Poker
- Full Tilt Online Poker Series
- Full Tilt Poker
- Full Tilt Poker Championship at Red Rock
- Fundamental theorem of poker

== G ==
- Gabe Kaplan
- Gabriela Hill
- Gala Coral Group
- Game
- Gary Berland
- Gary Jones (poker player)
- Gavin Griffin
- Gavin Smith (poker player)
- Gene Fisher
- Glen Chorny
- Glenn Cozen
- Glossary of poker terms
- Grant Hinkle
- Greg Raymer
- Gus Hansen
- Guts (card game)
- Gutshot Poker Club

== H ==
- Hal Fowler
- Hand-for-hand
- Hand history
- Hans Lund
- Harrington on Hold 'em
- Heads Up with Richard Herring
- Heartland Poker Tour
- Henry Green (poker player)
- Hero Poker
- High-low split
- High card by suit (poker)
- High Stakes on the Vegas Strip: Poker Edition
- High Stakes Poker
- History of poker
- Hole cam
- HORSE (poker)
- HOSE
- Howard Andrew
- Howard David
- Howard Lederer
- Hoyt Corkins
- Hung Doan

== I ==
- Ian Frazer (poker player)
- Independent Chip Model
- Intercontinental Poker Championship
- International Federation of Poker
- IRC poker
- Irish poker
- Irish Poker Open
- Irish Winter Festival of Poker
- Isabelle Mercier
- Isolation (poker)

== J ==
- J. C. Pearson (poker player)
- J. C. Tran
- J. J. Liu
- J.P. Kelly
- Jack Keller (poker player)
- Jackie McDaniels
- Jake Cody
- James Dempsey (poker player)
- James Richburg
- Jan Boubli
- Jason DeWitt
- Jason Lester
- Jason Mercier
- Jay Heimowitz
- Jeff Williams (poker player)
- Jennifer Harman
- Jennifer Leigh
- Jennifer Tilly
- Jerry Van Dyke
- Jesse May
- Jim Doman
- Jimmy Fricke
- Jimmy Snyder
- Joe Bartholdi Jr
- Joe Hachem
- Joe Pelton
- Joe Sebok
- John Ahlers
- John Cernuto
- John Duthie
- John Esposito (poker player)
- John Gale (poker player)
- John Guth
- John Hennigan (poker player)
- John Holmes Jenkins
- John Phan
- John Racener
- John Shipley (poker player)
- John Spadavecchia
- Johnny Chan
- Johnny Moss
- Joker Poker
- Jon Friedberg
- Jonathan Duhamel
- Jonathan Little
- Joseph Tehan
- Juha Helppi
- Julian Thew
- June Field

== K ==
- Kara Scott
- Karen Wolfson
- Karina Jett
- Kathy Liebert
- Katja Thater
- Kelly Kim
- Ken Lennaárd
- Kenna James
- Keven Stammen
- Kevin Nealon
- Kevin Pollak
- Kevin Saul
- Kicker (poker)
- Kill game (poker)
- King of Vegas
- Kristian Kjøndal
- Kristy Gazes
- Kuhn poker

== L ==
- Ladbrokes
- Lakewood Louie
- Latin American Poker Tour
- Latin American Poker Tour season 1 results
- Latin American Poker Tour season 2 results
- Latin American Poker Tour season 3 results
- Latin American Poker Tour season 4 results
- Layla Kayleigh
- Layne Flack
- Learn from the Pros
- Lee Markholt
- Lee Salem
- Leeann Tweeden
- Leisure and Gaming
- Let It Ride (card game)
- Liar's poker
- Linda Johnson
- Lisa Hamilton
- List of largest poker tournaments in history (by prize pool)
- List of playing-card nicknames
- List of Poker Hand Nicknames
- List of poker hands
- List of poker variants
- Little Man Popwell
- Liv Boeree
- Liz Lieu
- Lon McEachern
- Loretta Huber
- Louis Asmo
- Luca Pagano
- Lucky (American TV series)
- Lucy Rokach
- Luis Velador
- Lyle Berman

== M ==
- M-ratio
- Made hand
- Mads Andersen
- Malcolm Harwood
- Mansour Matloubi
- Maria Ho
- Maria Stern (poker player)
- Marie Gabert
- Mark Banin
- Mark Seif
- Mark Teltscher
- Marsha Waggoner
- Martin de Knijff
- Martin Wendt
- Mary Jones Meyer
- Mason Malmuth
- Matt Corboy
- Matt Graham (poker player)
- Matt Hawrilenko
- Matt Matros
- Matt Savage (poker)
- Matt Vasgersian
- Matthew Glantz
- Max Stern (poker player)
- Maxim Lykov
- Mayfair Club
- Mechanic's grip
- Mel Judah
- Melanie Weisner
- Melissa Hayden (poker player)
- Mendy Commanda
- Michael Banducci
- Michael DeMichele
- Michael Gracz
- Michael Graves (poker player)
- Michael Greco (actor)
- Michael Keiner
- Michael Konik
- Michael Martin (poker player)
- Michael McDonald (poker player)
- Michael Mizrachi
- Mickey Appleman
- Microgame (company)
- Mike Cappelletti
- Mike Hart (poker player)
- Mike Matusow
- Mike Sexton
- Mike Watson (poker player)
- Million Dollar Challenge (poker)
- Mimi Rogers
- Mimi Tran
- Mind sport
- Minh Ly
- Moneymaker Effect
- Monica Reeves
- Monte Carlo Millions
- Morton's theorem
- Murph Harrold

== N ==
- Nam Le (poker player)
- Nani Dollison
- National Heads-Up Poker Championship
- Negative freeroll
- Nenad Medić
- Nic Szeremeta
- Nick Schulman
- Noah Boeken
- Noli Francisco
- Non-standard poker hand
- Norm Macdonald
- Norman Chad
- Norman Pace
- North American Poker Tour
- North American Poker Tour season 1
- North American Poker Tour season 2
- November Nine

== O ==
- Omaha hold'em
- Omaha hold 'em
- One player to a hand
- Online poker
- Open-ended (poker)
- Open Directory Project
- Out (poker)
- Outline of poker
- Overlay (poker)

== P ==
- Paddy Power
- Padraig Parkinson
- Pai gow poker
- Partouche Poker Tour
- PartyPoker.com Football & Poker Legends Cup
- Pat Poels
- Patrick Bruel
- Patrik Antonius
- Paul Darden
- Paul Khoury
- Paul McKinney
- Paul Phillips (poker player)
- Perry Friedman
- Peter Feldman (poker player)
- Peter Jepsen
- Péter Traply
- Phil Gordon
- Phil Hellmuth
- Phil Ivey
- Phil Laak
- Phyllis Kessler
- Pinnacle Sports
- PKR.com
- Planet Poker
- Playing card
- Playtech
- Poker
- Poker After Dark
- Poker boom
- Poker calculator
- Poker chip
- Poker dealer
- Poker dice
- Poker Dome Challenge
- Poker equipment
- Poker Face Paul
- Poker hand
- Poker jargon
- Poker Million
- Poker Nations Cup
- Poker Night at the Inventory
- Poker Night Live
- Poker on television
- Poker Player
- Poker probability
- Poker psychology
- Poker Royale
- Poker run
- Poker Smash
- Poker strategy
- Poker table
- Poker tools
- Poker Tour Finnkampen
- Poker tournament
- Poker2Nite
- PokerStars
- PokerStars Big Game
- PokerStars Caribbean Adventure
- PokerStove
- Pokertek
- PokerTH
- PokerTracker
- Pokerzone
- Position (poker)
- Positively Fifth Street
- Post-oak bluff
- Pot (poker)
- Pot odds
- Prahlad Friedman
- Pro-Am Poker Equalizer
- Professional Poker Tour
- Protection (poker)
- Puggy Pearson
- Pyramid poker

== Q ==
- Q-ratio

== R ==
- Rake (poker)
- Ram Vaswani
- Rank of hands (poker)
- Red dog poker
- Red Hodges
- Red Hot Poker Tour
- Red Winn
- Richard Herring
- Rob Hollink
- Robert Cheung
- Robert Thompson (poker director)
- Robert Turner (poker player)
- Robert Williamson III
- Roberto Romanello
- Rod Peate
- Roland De Wolfe
- Rolf Slotboom
- Roll your own (poker)
- Rollout (poker)
- Ron Rose
- Rose Pifer
- Roy Brindley
- Roy Winston (poker player)
- Rupert Elder
- Russian Poker
- Ruth Godfrey (poker player)
- Ryan Daut

== S ==
- Sabina Gadecki
- Sally Boyer
- Sam Angel
- Sam Mastrogiannis
- Sam Trickett
- Sarge Ferris
- Satellite tournament
- Scott Clements
- Scott Fischman
- Scott Seiver
- Scotty Nguyen
- Sebastian Ruthenberg
- Seven-card stud
- Sexy Poker
- Shana Hiatt
- Shandi Finnessey
- Shannon Elizabeth
- Shawn Buchanan
- Shirley Rosario
- Short-stacked
- Showdown (poker)
- Sid Wyman
- Simon Trumper
- Sky Betting and Gaming
- Slow play (poker)
- Southern District of New York action against online poker players
- Spanish poker
- Speed poker
- Split (poker)
- Sport
- Sportingbet
- Stacked with Daniel Negreanu
- Stan James
- Stanley Weiss
- Starla Brodie
- Steal (poker)
- Steve Brecher
- Steve Paul-Ambrose
- Straight flush
- Strip poker
- Strip Poker (game show)
- Stripped deck
- Stu Ungar
- Stuart Fox
- Stud poker
- Suited connectors
- Super Bowl of Poker
- Super/System
- Susie Isaacs
- Sverre Krogh Sundbø
- Svetlana Gromenkova

== T ==
- T. J. Cloutier
- Table stakes
- Tatjana Pašalić
- Taylor von Kriegenbergh
- Ted Forrest
- Tell (poker)
- Terry King
- Texas Hold'em Bonus Poker
- Texas Hold'em Tournament
- Texas hold 'em
- Texas Hold 'em (video game)
- Texas Hold 'Em Poker (video game)
- Texas HoldEm Poker (Zynga game)
- Thang Luu
- The Biggest Game in Town
- The Gaming Club World Poker Championship
- The Poker Channel
- The Poker Player's Championship
- The Poker Star
- The Professor, the Banker, and the Suicide King
- The United States Poker Championship
- Theo Jørgensen
- Thomas Bihl
- Thor Hansen
- Three card brag
- Three card poker
- Tiffany Michelle
- Tiffany Williamson
- Tilt (poker)
- Tilt (TV series)
- Tom Abdo
- Tom Marchese
- Tom McEvoy
- Tony Cascarino
- Tony Cousineau
- Tony G
- Tony Kendall (poker player)
- Tournament director (poker)
- Tuan Le
- Twist (poker)

== U ==
- UK and Ireland Poker Tour
- UK and Ireland Poker Tour season 1 results
- UK and Ireland Poker Tour season 2 results
- Ultimate Poker Challenge
- UltimateBet
- Underground poker
- Unibet
- United States v. Scheinberg
- Unlawful Internet Gambling Enforcement Act of 2006

== V ==
- Value (poker)
- Vanessa Rousso
- Vanessa Selbst
- Vegas Stakes
- Victor Chandler Poker Cup
- Victor Ramdin
- Victoria Coren
- Vincent Van Patten
- Vivek Rajkumar

== W ==
- Wendeen H. Eolis
- Wild card (card games)
- William Hill (bookmaker)
- William Thorson
- World Championship of Online Poker
- World Championship Poker
- World Cup of Poker
- World Heads-Up Poker Championship
- World Poker Tour
- World Poker Tour season 10 results
- World Series of Poker
- World Series of Poker (video game)
- World Series of Poker 2008: Battle for the Bracelets
- World Series of Poker: Pro Challenge
- World Series of Poker: Tournament of Champions
- World Sports Exchange
- World Tavern Poker Tour

== Y ==
- Yahoo! Directory
- Yevgeniy Timoshenko
- Yoshio Nakano
