= Anders Henriksson =

Anders Henriksson may refer to:

- Anders Henriksson i Vinstorp (1870–?), Swedish politician
- Anders Henriksson (poker player) (born 1981), Swedish poker player
- Anders Henriksson (record producer) (1945–2016), Swedish producer and musician
- Anders Henriksson (politician) (born 1961), Swedish politician and Kalmar FF chairman
- Anders Henriksson (speedway rider) (born 1975), Swedish speedway rider
