= Latin American Poker Tour season 1 results =

LAPT Season 1
- League: Latin American Poker Tour
- Sport: Texas Hold 'em
- Duration: May 3, 2008 – August 9, 2008

LAPT seasons
- Season 2 →

Below are the results of the first season of the Latin American Poker Tour (LAPT). All currency amounts are in US dollars.

== Results ==
=== (Brazil) LAPT Rio de Janeiro ===
- Casino: Intercontinental Hotel. Rio de Janeiro, Brazil
- Buy-in: $2,500
- 3-Day Event: Saturday, May 3, 2008, to Monday, May 5, 2008
- Number of buy-ins: 314
- Total Prize Pool: $785,000
- Number of Payouts: 32
- Winning Hand: 8♠ 7♠
- Official Results: The Hendom Mob

Final Table
Place	Name	Prize
1st	(Netherlands) Julien Nuijten	$222,940
2nd	(United States) Vitaly Kovayzin	$117,750
3rd	(Germany) Nikolai Senninger	$86,350
4th	(Costa Rica) Alex Brenes	$62,800
5th	(Brazil) Eduardo Henriques	$47,100
6th	(Germany) Oliver Kugler	$31,400
7th	(Colombia) Rafael Pardo	$23,550
8th	(Venezuela) Juan Carlos Burguillos	$15,700
9th	(Switzerland) Severin Walser	$11,775

=== (Costa Rica) LAPT San José ===
- Casino: Ramada Plaza Herradura, San José, Costa Rica
- Buy-in: $2,500 + $200
- 3-Day Event: Thursday, May 22, 2008, to Saturday, May 24, 2008
- Number of buy-ins: 398
- Total Prize Pool: $965,150
- Number of Payouts: 32
- Winning Hand: A♥ A♦
- Official Results: The Hendom Mob

Final Table
Place	Name	Prize
1st	(Hungary) Valdemar Kwaysser	$274,103
2nd	(United States) Max Steinberg	$144,773
3rd	(United States) Steven Silverman	$106,167
4th	(Sweden) Alexander Soderlund	$77,213
5th	(United States) Alec Torelli	$57,909
6th	(Poland) Pawel Sanojca	$38,606
7th	(United States) Ashton Griffin	$28,956
8th	(United States) Joe Ebanks	$19,303
9th	(Costa Rica) Steven Thompson	$14,477

=== (Uruguay) LAPT Punta del Este ===
- Casino: Mantra Resort Spa Casino, La Barra, San Carlos, Uruguay
- Buy-in: $2,500 + $200
- 3-Day Event: Thursday, August 7, 2008, to Saturday, August 9, 2008
- Number of buy-ins: 351
- Total Prize Pool: $851,175
- Number of Payouts: 32
- Winning Hand: K♠ 3♣
- Official Results: The Hendom Mob

Final Table
Place	Name	Prize
1st	(Spain) José Miguel Espinar	$241,735
2nd	(Costa Rica) Alex Brenes	$127,675
3rd	(Argentina) Lisandro Gallo	$93,630
4th	(Brazil) Alexandre Gomes	$68,100
5th	(Canada) Gylbert Drolet	$51,070
6th	(Brazil) Sidney Chreem	$34,045
7th	(Argentina) Juan José Pérez	$25,535
8th	(Brazil) Paulo César Ribeiro	$17,025
9th	(Argentina) Carlos Curi	$12,765
