= Ruth Godfrey =

Ruth Godfrey may refer to:

- Ruth Godfrey (poker player), American poker player
- Ruth Godfrey (actress) (1922–1985), American film actress
