= Raymond Wu =

Raymond Wu may refer to:

- Raymond Wu (poker player)
- Raymond Wu (politician)
