= Latin American Poker Tour season 5 results =

For the card game of poker for 2012, below are the results of the fifth season of the Latin American Poker Tour (LAPT). All currency amounts are in US dollars.

== Results ==
=== (Chile) LAPT Viña del Mar ===
- LAPT CHILE NATIONAL POKER CHAMPIONSHIP
- Cassino: Enjoy Viña del Mar Casino & Resort
- Buy-in: $1,100
- 4 Day-event: March 21–25, 2012
- Number of buy-ins: 672
- Total Prize Pool: U$D 651.840,00
- Number of Payouts: 104
- Winning Hand: J♣ 7♣

Final Table
Pos.	Name	Prize
1º	(Chile) Alirio Diaz	U$D 129,470.00 (* U$D 76,580.00)
2º	(Chile) Leonardo Olivares	U$D 84,090.00 (* U$D 66,000.00)
3º	(Brazil) João Lopes	U$D 58,010.00 (* U$D 58,000.00)
4º	(Chile) Felipe Velasquez	U$D 43,540.00 (* U$D 74,000.00)
5º	(Argentina) Javier Venegas	U$D 32,460.00 (* U$D 50,000.00)
6º	(Colombia) Sergio Escobar	U$D 23,990.00 (* U$D 47,000.00)
7º	(Brazil) Halysson Sala	U$D 17,470.00
8º	(United States) Nicolas Batt	U$D 13,040.00

- Agreement among the finalists.

=== (Uruguay) LAPT Punta del Este ===
- Cassino: Mantra Resort SPA Casino
- Buy-in: $2,500
- 5 Day-event: May 23–27, 2012
- Number of buy-ins: 375
- Total Prize Pool: U$D 836.625
- Number of payouts: 56
- Winning Hand: A♣ K♥

Final Table
Pos.	Name	Prize
1º	(Brazil) Marcelo Ramos da Fonseca	U$D 144,240.00
2º	(Mexico) Angel Guillen	U$D 126,240.00
3º	(Brazil) Francisco Baruffi Neto	U$D 116,240.00
4º	(Uruguay) Pablo Joaquin Melogno	U$D 60,420.00
5º	(Argentina) Ivan Luca	U$D 46,000.00
6º	(Argentina) Osvaldo Silvio Resquin	U$D 35,970.00
7º	(Russia) Vladimir Dobrovolskiy	U$D 26,770.00
8º	(Argentina) Guido Ruffini	U$D 20,080.00
9º	(Argentina) Carlos Leoncio Mironiuk	U$D 15,390.00

=== LAPT Colombia ===
- LAPT COLOMBIA NATIONAL POKER CHAMPIONSHIP
- Cassino: Casino Allegre - Centro Comercial Premium Plaza
- Buy-in: Col$ 4,200,000 (approx. $2,300.00)
- 5-day event: August 7–12, 2012
- Number of buy-ins: 337
- Total Prize Pool: COL 1,248,720.00 (U$D 698.377)
- Number of payouts: 48
- Winning Hand: Q♣ Q♦

Final Table
Pos.	Name	Prize
1º	(Republic of Ireland) Robbie Renehan	COL 264,700,000 (US$ 148,040.00)
2º	(Brazil) Jayr Fregona	COL 200.000.000 (US$ 111,855.00)
3º	(Spain) Raul Perez	COL 122.350.000 (US$ 68,430.00)
4º	(Colombia) Weider Vanegas	COL 91.160.000 (US$ 50,985.00)
5º	(Colombia) Cristian Velasquez	COL 69.930.000 (US$ 39,110.00)
6º	(Colombia) Hernan Villa	COL 54.940.000 (US$ 30,730.00)
7º	(Colombia) Ruben Ospina	COL 41.210.000 (US$ 23,050.00)
8º	(Colombia) Felipe Perez	COL 31.220.000 (US$ 17,460.00)

=== LAPT Panama ===
- Cassino: Veneto Casino
- Buy-in: $2,500
- Data: September 26–30, 2012
- Number of buy-ins: 338
- Total Prize Pool: U$D 754.080
- Number of Payouts: 48
- Winning Hand: T♣ T♦

Final Table
Pos.	Name	Prize
1º	(Argentina) Leo Fernandez	US$ 171,930.00
2º	(Mexico) Patrick Mahoney	US$ 108,700.00
3º	(Brazil) Marco Antonio Pedroso	US$ 73,900.00
4º	(Peru) Walid Mubarak	US$ 55,050.00
5º	(Costa Rica) Johnny Sandoval	US$ 42,230.00
6º	(Panama) Isaac Malca	US$ 33,180.00
7º	(United Kingdom) Sam Razavi	US$ 24,880.00
8º	(Mexico) Diego Sanchez	US$ 18,850.00

=== (Peru) LAPT Lima ===
- Cassino: Atlantic City Casino
- Buy-in: $2,500
- DAta: November 14–18, 2012
- Number of buy-ins: 376
- Total Prize Pool: US$ 838.860
- Number of Payouts: 56
- Winning Hand: K♦ 9♣

Mesa final
Pos.	Nome	Prêmio
1º	(Mexico) Jordan Scott	US$ 168.210.00
2º	(France) Maxence Debar	US$ 138.210.00
3º	(Peru) Oscar Barriga	US$ 81.370.00
4º	(Venezuela) Jorge González	US$ 60.400.00
5º	(Panama) Brent Sheirbon	US$ 46.140.00
6º	(Argentina) Jose Ignacio Barbero	US$ 36.070.00
7º	(Argentina) Aramis Salvadori	US$ 26.840.00
8º	(Venezuela) Roberto Vahlis	US$ 20.130.00
