= PokerStove =

Poker calculator

- Developer: RPS Consulting
- Stable release: 1.23 / 2008
- Operating system: Microsoft Windows
- Type: Poker tools
- License: Proprietary
- Website: PokerStove GitHub Repository
- Repository: github.com/andrewprock/pokerstove

PokerStove is a freeware probabilistic poker calculator that determines the odds of winning a Texas Hold'em hand using combinatorics.

== Detail ==
Sample Equity Calculation Text Output

Text results appended to pokerstove.txt

 227,292,945,264  games   738.587 secs   307,740,246  games/sec

Board: 
Dead:  

	equity 	win 	tie 	      pots won 	pots tied	
Hand 0: 	48.785%  	48.29% 	00.50% 	  109752588462 	1133081028.33   { JdJh }
Hand 1: 	33.829%  	33.20% 	00.63% 	   75466086220 	1424322325.33   { 77+, A8s+, K9s+, QTs+, JTs, ATo+, KJo+ }
Hand 2: 	17.386%  	17.01% 	00.38% 	   38663294684 	853572544.33   { random }

PokerStove is a program that calculates hand equities (i.e., expected percentage of the time that each hand wins at showdown). Since poker is a game of incomplete information, the calculator is designed to evaluate the equity of ranges of hands that players can hold, instead of individual hands. Pokerstove can calculate both pre-flop and post-flop equity given the community cards.

== Reviews ==
Poker instructor, Gavin Griffin, recommends PokerStove as a calculator for EV in poker and considers it the best tool for calculating EV based on hand ranges.
