= Gutshot Poker Club =

Defunct poker club in London

- Location in London
- Interactive map of Gutshot Poker Club
- Location: London, England; 44-48 Clerkenwell Road; 51°31′23.37″N 0°6′2.4″W
- Opened: March 2004
- Closed: 2007
- Owner: Barry Martin; Derek Kelly

The Gutshot Poker Club (also known as The Gutshot Poker Collective or simply The Gutshot) was a poker club, bar, restaurant and internet cafe located on Clerkenwell Road, London, England. The club opened in March 2004 and closed in 2007. It was founded by Barry Martin and Derek Kelly.

== Overview ==
The club ran poker ring games, and tournaments one to three times per day, and hosted four festivals of poker per annum.

Amongst the successes achieved by members of the club are:

- Tiffany Williamson, 2005 World Series of Poker (WSOP) main event, 15th place ($400,000)
- Roland De Wolfe, World Poker Tour (WPT) fourth season Grand Prix de Paris winner (€479,680;) WPT fourth season championship, 3rd place ($1,025,505); European Poker Tour (EPT) third season Ireland winner (€554,300); 2007 Irish Poker Open, 2nd place (€325,000)
- Praz Bansi, 2006 World Series of Poker bracelet winner ($230,209)
- Hunter All Stars Gooner Mo won £756 from a £10 stake. He trusted the process.

In addition to many English poker players, former WSOP main event champions Phil Hellmuth Jr, Chris Ferguson, Chris Moneymaker, Greg Raymer and Joe Hachem also played at the venue, as well as others such as Scott Fischman, Howard Lederer, Marcel Lüske and Andy Bloch.

In May 2006, the Gutshot held the first ever event of the Showdown Poker Tour, a £3,448 buy-in event won by EPT winner Mats Gavatin.

On 16 January 2007, the owner of the club was convicted of contravening the Gaming Act. The jury in the case rejected Derek Kelly's contention that poker was a game of skill, and thus exempt from the Gaming Act. Derek Kelly appealed this verdict at the Royal Court of Appeal in London but failed, after which the club closed.

== Gutshot.com ==
The club also had its own online poker software, which survived the closure of the club. Gutshot Poker began on the Microgaming network but was transferred to the Cake Poker Network in 2008, and later to iPoker network. It is now part of the Merge Network. The main site also included a popular forum in addition to news, features, strategy articles and blogs.
