= Latin American Poker Tour season 3 results =

Below are the results of the third season of the Latin American Poker Tour (LAPT). All currency amounts are in US dollars.

== Results ==
=== (Costa Rica) LAPT Playa Conchal ===
- Casino: Ramada Plaza Herradura
- Buy-in: $2,500 +$200
- 4-Day Event: November 19–22, 2009
- Number of buy-ins: 259
- Total Prize Pool: $628,075
- Number of Payouts: 40

Final Table
Place	Name	Prize
1st	(Canada) Amer Sulaiman	$172,095
2nd	(Canada) Sol Bergren	$100,495
3rd	(Costa Rica) Rogelio Pardo	$61,551
4th	(Canada) Eric Levesque	$45,221
5th	(Canada) Francis-Nicolas Brouchard	$32,660
6th	(Canada) Darren Keyes	$26,380
7th	(Guatemala) Carlos Girou	$20,098
8th	(Netherlands) Patrick De Koster	$13,818

=== (Uruguay) LAPT Punta del Este ===
- Casino: Mantra Resort Spa Casino
- Buy-in: $3,700
- 4-Day Event: February 24–27, 2010
- Number of buy-ins: 307
- Total Prize Pool: $1,042,260
- Number of Payouts: 48

Final Table
Place	Name	Prize
1st	(Argentina) Jose "Nacho" Barbero	$279,330
2nd	(France) Nicolas Cardyn	$161,550
3rd	(Argentina) Andres Korn	$99,020
4th	(Uruguay) Norbert Ludger	$72,960
5th	(Brazil) Daniela Zapiello	$52,110
6th	(Colombia) Marco Caicedo	$41,690
7th	(Brazil) Bernardo "Bedias" Dias	$31,270
8th	(Argentina) Roman Suarez	$20,850

=== (Peru) LAPT Lima ===
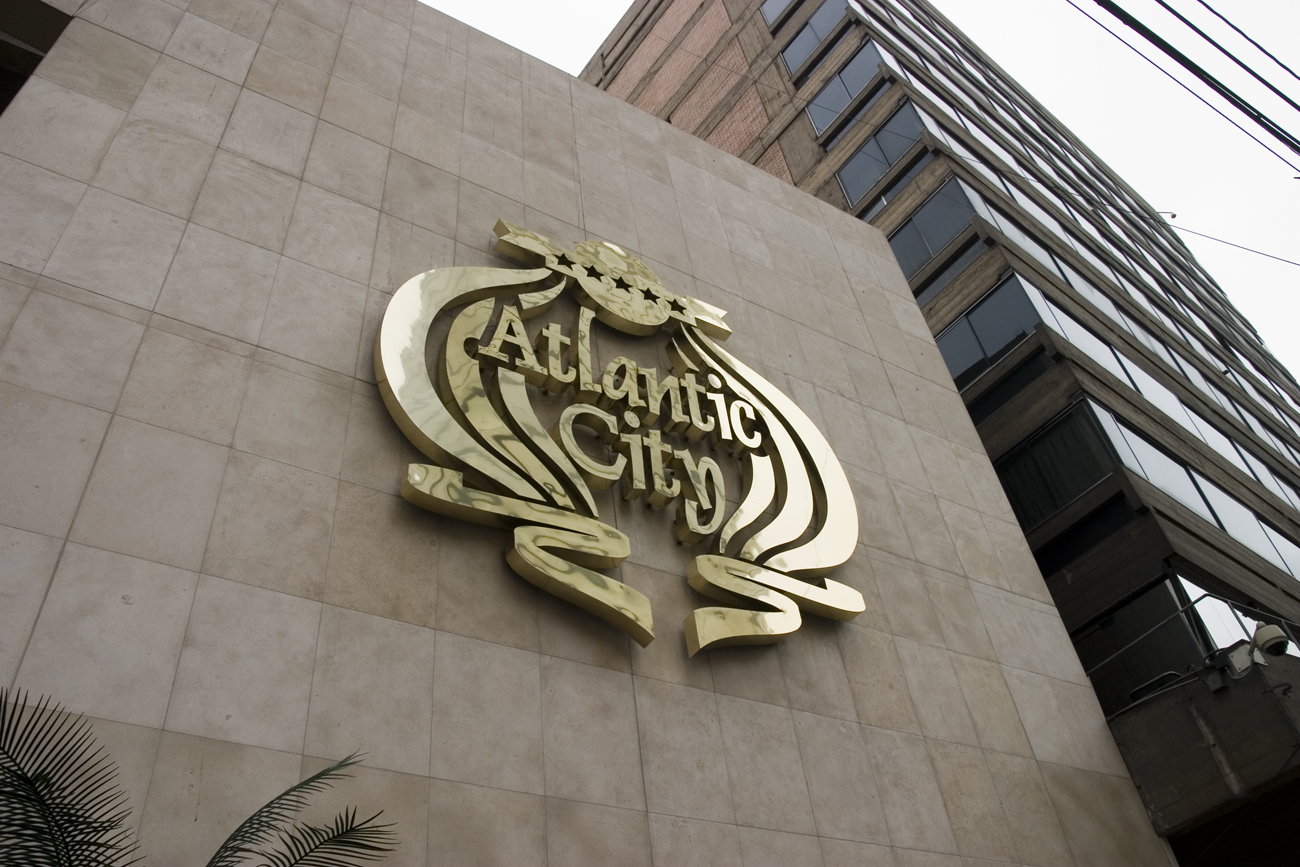
The Atlantic City casino in Lima.

- Casino: Atlantic City Casino
- Buy-in: $2,500 +$200
- 4-Day Event: June 2–5, 2010
- Number of buy-ins: 384
- Total Prize Pool: $931,200
- Number of Payouts: 48

Final Table
Place	Name	Prize
1st	(Argentina) Jose "Nacho" Barbero	$250,000
2nd	(United States) Ben Barrows	$144,000
3rd	(Peru) Erick Cabrera	$88,400
4th	(Chile) Ismael Cadiz	$65,100
5th	(Brazil) Silvio Ferreira Martins	$46,500
6th	(Chile) Rene Patricio Aguilar Gutierrez	$37,300
7th	(Colombia) Carlos Augusto Perez Herrera	$28,000
8th	(Venezuela) Valerio Varela	$18,600

=== (Brazil) LAPT Florianópolis ===
- Casino:
- Buy-in: $2,500 +$200 (R$5,000)
- 4-Day Event: August 5–8, 2010
- Number of buy-ins: 356
- Total Prize Pool: $995,996 (R$1,624,200)
- Number of Payouts: 48

Final Table
Place	Name	Prize
1st	(Austria) Matthias Habernig	$247,441
2nd	(Brazil) Dayan Vardanega	$143,174
3rd	(Brazil) Alexandre Richard	$87,600
4th	(Colombia) Miguel Velasco	$64,676
5th	(Brazil) Robson Kazan	$46,246
6th	(Brazil) Andre Scaff	$36,974
7th	(Brazil) Rodrigo Scartezini	$27,702
8th	(Canada) Rudy Blondeau	$18,476

=== (Argentina) LAPT Rosario Grand Final ===
- Casino: City Center Casino, Rosario
- Buy-in: $4,700 +$300
- 5-Day Event: September 22–26, 2010
- Number of buy-ins: 254
- Total Prize Pool: $1,176,200
- Number of Payouts: 40

Final Table
Place	Name	Prize
1st	(Peru) Martin Sansour	$322,280
2nd	(Panama) Bolivar Palacios	$188,200
3rd	(Argentina) Daniel Ades	$115,270
4th	(United States) William Ross	$84,690
5th	(Argentina) Roberto Bianchi	$61,160
6th	(Austria) Matthias Habernig	$49,400
7th	(Argentina) Ivan Saul	$37,640
8th	(Chile) Nicolas Alberto Fierro Gottner	$25,880
