= Independent Chip Model =

Mathematical model in poker

In poker, the Independent Chip Model (ICM), also known as the Malmuth–Harville method, is a mathematical model that approximates a player's overall equity in an incomplete tournament. David Harville first developed the model in a 1973 paper on horse racing; in 1987, Mason Malmuth independently rediscovered it for poker. In the ICM, all players have equal skill, so current stack sizes entirely determine the probability distribution for each player's final ranking. The model then approximates this probability distribution and computes expected prize money.

Poker players use ICM to estimate their tournament equity, negotiate final-table deals, and evaluate strategic decisions. Poker solvers use ICM as a utility function to optimize strategies in terms of expected prize money.

ICM calculations require the chip stacks of all remaining players and the payout structure. However, enumerating every possible finishing order becomes computationally intractable as the number of players increases. For large fields, ICM can instead be evaluated using methods such as Monte Carlo simulation or numerical integration.

== Model ==
The original ICM model operates as follows:

- Every player's chance of finishing 1st is proportional to the player's chip count.
- Otherwise, if player k finishes 1st, then player i finishes 2nd with probability
  $$\mathbb{P}\left[X_i=2\mid X_k=1\right]=\frac{x_i}{1-x_k}$$
- Likewise, if players m_{1}, ..., m_{j-1} finish (respectively) 1st, ..., (j-1)^{st}, then player i finishes j^{th} with probability
  $$\mathbb{P}\left[X_i=j\mid X_{m_z}=z\quad(1\leq z<j)\right]=\frac{x_i}{1-\sum_{z=1}^{j-1}{x_{m_z}}}$$
- The joint distribution of the players' final rankings is then the product of these conditional probabilities.
- The expected payout is the payoff-weighted sum of these joint probabilities across all n! possible rankings of the n players.

For example, suppose players A, B, and C have (respectively) 50%, 30%, and 20% of the tournament chips. The 1st-place payout is 70 units and the 2nd-place payout 30 units. Then
$$\mathbb{P}[A=1,B=2,C=3]=0.5\cdot\frac{0.3}{1-0.5}=0.3$$
$$\mathbb{P}[A=1,C=2,B=3]=0.5\cdot\frac{0.2}{1-0.5}=0.2$$
$$\mathbb{P}[B=1,A=2,C=3]=0.3\cdot\frac{0.5}{1-0.3}\approx0.21$$
$$\mathbb{P}[B=1,A=3,C=2]=0.3\cdot\frac{0.2}{1-0.3}\approx0.09$$
$$\mathbb{P}[C=1,A=2,B=3]=0.2\cdot\frac{0.5}{1-0.2}\approx0.13$$
$$\mathbb{P}[C=1,A=3,B=2]=0.2\cdot\frac{0.3}{1-0.2}\approx0.08$$
$$\mathrm{ICM}(A)=70(0.3+0.2)+30(0.21\cdots+0.13\cdots)\approx45\approx90\%$$
$$\mathrm{ICM}(B)=70(0.21\cdots+0.09\cdots)+30(0.3+0.08\cdots)\approx32\approx110\%$$
$$\mathrm{ICM}(C)=70(0.13\cdots+0.08\cdots)+30(0.2+0.09\cdots)\approx22\approx110%$$
where the percentages describe a player's expected payout relative to their current stack.

== Comparison to gambler's ruin ==
Because the ICM ignores player skill, the classical gambler's ruin problem also models the omitted poker games, but more precisely. Harville-Malmuth's formulas only coincide with gambler's-ruin estimates in the 2-player case. With 3 or more players, they give misleading probabilities, but adequately approximate the expected payout.

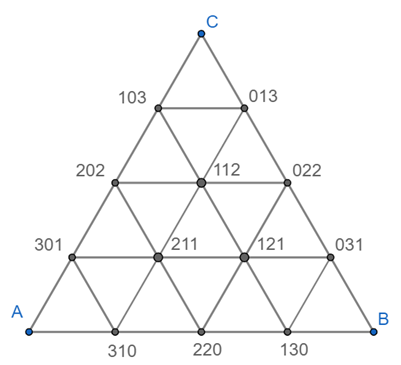
The FEM mesh for 3 players and 4 chips.

For example, suppose very few players (e.g. 3 or 4). In this case, the finite-element method (FEM) suffices to solve the gambler's ruin exactly. Extremal cases are as follows:

3 players; 200 chips; $50/30/20 payout
Current stacks			Data type	P[A finishes ...]			Equity
A	B	C	Data type	1st	2nd	3rd	Equity
25	87	88	ICM	0.125	0.1944	0.6806	$25.69
25	87	88	FEM	0.125	0.1584	0.7166	$25.33
25	87	88	|ICM-FEM|	0	0.0360	0.0360	$0.36
25	87	88	(|ICM-FEM|)/FEM	0%	22.73%	5.02%	1.42%
21	89	90	ICM	0.105	0.1701	0.7249	$24.85
21	89	90	FEM	0.105	0.1346	0.7604	$24.50
21	89	90	|ICM-FEM|	0	0.0355	0.0355	$0.35
21	89	90	(|ICM-FEM|)/FEM	0%	26.37%	4.67%	1.43%
198	1	1	ICM	0.99	0.009950	0.000050	$49.80
198	1	1	FEM	0.99	0.009999	0.000001	$49.80
198	1	1	|ICM-FEM|	0	0.000049	0.000049	$0
198	1	1	(|ICM-FEM|)/FEM	0%	0.49%	4900%	0%

The 25/87/88 game state gives the largest absolute difference between an ICM and FEM probability (0.0360) and the largest tournament equity difference ($0.36). However, the relative equity difference is small: only 1.42%. The largest relative difference is only slightly larger (1.43%), corresponding to a 21/89/90 game. The 198/1/1 game state gives the largest relative probability difference (4900%), but only for an extremely unlikely event.

Results in the 4-player case are analogous.
