= Latin American Poker Tour season 2 results =

Below are the results of the second season of the Latin American Poker Tour (LAPT). All currency amounts are in US dollars.

== Results ==
=== (Costa Rica) LAPT San José ===
- Casino: Ramada Plaza Herradura
- Buy-in: $3,700
- 3-Day Event: Monday, November 3, 2008, to Wednesday, November 5, 2008
- Number of buy-ins: 219
- Total Prize Pool: $1,000,000
- Number of Payouts: 24
- Winning Hand: A♠ 10♥

Final Table
Place	Name	Prize
1st	(United States) Ryan Fee	$285,773
2nd	(United States) Joel Micka	$148,993
3rd	(United States) Brent Sheirbon	$109,913
4th	(Venezuela) Jesús Bertoli	$80,603
5th	(Canada) Andrew Chen	$61,063
6th	(United States) Jeffrey Petronack	$43,960
7th	(Denmark) Claus Rasmussen	$34,195
8th	(Costa Rica) Maria Stern	$24,425

=== (Mexico) LAPT Nuevo Vallarta ===
- Casino: Marival Resort and Suites
- Buy-in: $2,700
- 3-Day Event: Friday, December 5, 2008, to Sunday, December 7, 2008
- Number of buy-ins: 242
- Total Prize Pool: $586,850 +$44,500 (in Mexico) +$50,000 (Final Table)
- Number of Payouts:89
- Note: the 2008 PokerStars.net LAPT Nuevo Vallarta, Mexico event was canceled due to local gaming officials making a decision in the middle of play on Day 1 to rescind the LAPT's gaming license, PokerStars, who host the event, has said that the remaining 89 players will receive $5,000 and a divided remainder of the prize pool based on each player's chip count and an extra $500 paid by PokerStars as a courtesy.

==== Day 2 Online ====
To complete the event, PokerStars decided to play DAY 2 online, with the 89 players still in play at LAPT Mexico, on the PokerStars platform until the final table was formed. When the final table was formed, it was stopped again for the 9 players to meet live again, but now during the LAPT Punta Del Este which took place in March 2009. PokerStars covered all travel and accommodation expenses and it also added a prize for the final table competitors.

==== Final Table Live ====
Place	Name	Prize
1st	(United States) Rory Cox	$15,000
2nd	(United States) Helen Prager	$11,000
3rd	(United States) Pavel Naydenov	$7,500
4th	(Venezuela) Leonardo Emperador	$5,000
5th	(Costa Rica) Steven Thompson	$4,000
6th	(Mexico) Martha Herrera	$3,000
7th	(Panama) Bolivar Palacios	$2,000
8th	(Costa Rica) Alex Brenes	$1,500
9th	(United States) Victor Ramdin	$1,000

- Prizepool added by PokerStars

=== (Chile) LAPT Viña del Mar ===
- Casino: Enjoy Viña del Mar Casino & Resort
- Buy-in: $3,500
- 3-Day Event: Tuesday, January 20, 2009, to Thursday, January 22, 2009
- Number of buy-ins: 216
- Total Prize Pool: $523,800
- Number of Payouts: 27
- Winning Hand: A♠ J♣

Final Table
Place	Name	Prize
1st	(Argentina) Fabián Ortiz	$141,426
2nd	(Venezuela) Vincenzo Giannelli	$78,570
3rd	(Argentina) Damian Salas	$52,380
4th	(Brazil) Leandro Balotin	$39,285
5th	(Colombia) Hernán Villa	$28,809
6th	(Brazil) Fabio Escobar	$23,571
7th	(Chile) Jyries Aguad	$18,330
8th	(Argentina) Eduardo Camia	$13,095
9th	(Uruguay) Jaime Atelenoff	$10,476

=== (Uruguay) LAPT Punta del Este ===
- Casino: Mantra Resort Spa Casino
- Buy-in: $3,500
- 3-Day Event: Wednesday, March 18, 2009, to Friday, March 20, 2009
- Number of buy-ins: 327
- Total Prize Pool: $1,110,200
- Number of Payouts: 36
- Winning Hand: 9♥ 8♥

Final Table
Place	Name	Prize
1st	(Norway) Karl Hevroy	$283,580
2nd	(Uruguay) Alejandro Arruaberrena	$155,420
3rd	(Mexico) Angel Guillen	$99,920
4th	(United States) Ronald Wasiel	$82,160
5th	(Canada) Oliver Rowe	$59,960
6th	(Brazil) Waldemar Cogo	$48,840
7th	(Panama) Bolivar Palacios	$37,740
8th	(Brazil) Magno Aragao	$26,640
9th	(Brazil) André Ventura	$21,100

=== (Argentina) LAPT Mar del Plata ===
- Casino: Casino Central
- Buy-in: $5,000
- 4-Day Event: Thursday, April 16, 2009, to Sunday, April 19, 2009
- Number of buy-ins: 291
- Total Prize Pool: $1,411,350
- Number of Payouts: 27
- Winning Hand: K♠ J♥

Final Table
Place	Name	Prize
1st	(Germany) Dominik Nitsche	$381,030
2nd	(Mexico) Jorge Landazuri	$211,700
3rd	(Chile) Rodolfo Awad	$141,140
4th	(Argentina) Segio Farias	$105,860
5th	(United States) Jason Skeans	$77,620
6th	(Argentina) Leo Fernandez	$63,520
7th	(Canada) Derek Lerner	$49,400
8th	(Netherlands) Alfons Fenijn	$35,280
9th	(Argentina) Jose "Nacho" Barbero	$28,220
