= Bounty (poker) =

Poker tournament format where players earn rewards for eliminating opponents

A bounty is a feature in some poker tournaments that rewards a player for eliminating another player. Depending on the tournament, a player might be rewarded for eliminating either a specific player, or any player. The reward is almost always a cash prize, and not tournament currency. Bounties are rare, but do occur occasionally in professional tournaments. They are more commonly only implemented in smaller tournaments, or charitable tournaments.

In bounty tournaments that reward a player for every player they eliminate, the buy-in structure of the tournament may require each player to pay an additional amount for their own bounty chip, or token. This bounty chip is carried by the player throughout the tournament. If the player is eliminated, the bounty chip is given to the player who eliminated them. The bounty chips are cashed in, usually for the amount each player paid for the bounty chip. The winner can usually cash in their own chip. Some online tournaments use a more complicated schedule, whereby a player's own bounty increases with every elimination he makes.

Some bounty tournaments assign a bounty to only a few players. This assignment is rarely random, and is usually pre-arranged with the players who have bounties on them, as such an assignment to a random entrant would significantly affect their game. Some tournaments may feature a celebrity bounty, if the tournament hosts have arranged for a celebrity to play in the tournament. This type of bounty arrangement is usually only the celebrity bounty variety, or if the player with a bounty on them is promoting the tournament.

The aspect of having a bounty in a tournament can significantly affect the play of the tournament. For example, if a player with a lower amount of chips declares that they are all-in, other players may be more enticed to call the bet. Most professional poker players would alter their normal playing style to adapt to this aspect if they were to enter a bounty tournament.

If there is at least one side pot, the situation becomes more complicated. The bounty is awarded to the player who wins the eliminated player's last chips. For example:

Daniel ($300 in chips), Barry ($200) and Vicky ($500) are playing a hand in a no-limit tournament. Daniel moves all-in (bets all his chips), and Barry and Vicky call. The main pot consists of $600, $200 from each player; any of the three players can win this pot. A side pot of $200, $100 each from Daniel and Vicky, cannot be won by Barry, as he did not have enough chips. Barry has the best hand and wins the main pot, but does not eliminate Daniel. Vicky wins the side pot, and by taking Daniel's last chips, also gains the bounty.

== Types of Bounty Tournaments ==
Standard Knockout (SKO)
In a standard knockout tournament, a fixed portion of each player's buy-in is allocated as a bounty. When a player eliminates an opponent, they receive the full bounty amount associated with that player.
Progressive Knockout (PKO)
In progressive knockout tournaments, the bounty system is dynamic. When a player eliminates an opponent, they receive a portion of the opponent's bounty, while the remaining part is added to their own bounty. This creates escalating incentives as the tournament progresses. For example, in many PKO formats, 50% of the eliminated player's bounty is awarded to the eliminator, and the other 50% increases the eliminator's own bounty.
Mystery Bounty
Mystery bounty tournaments introduce an element of chance. After reaching a certain stage in the tournament, players who eliminate opponents draw from a pool of concealed bounty prizes, which can vary significantly in value. At the 2025 World Series of Poker's "Mystery Millions" event, two $1,000,000 bounties were drawn, marking one of the most dramatic moments in the tournament's history.
