= Fold equity =

Poker strategy concept

Fold equity is a concept in poker strategy that is especially important when a player becomes short-stacked in a no limit (or possibly pot limit) tournament. It is the equity a player can expect to gain due to the opponent folding to his or her bets. It equates to:

$$\text{Fold Equity}\, = \text{likelihood that opponent folds } * \text{ gain in equity if opponent(s) fold}$$

The first half of the formula can be estimated based on reads on opponents or their previous actions. The second part is the equity obtained when the opponent(s) fold to your raise (i.e. the total current pot), minus the equity resulting in case your opponent(s) call your raise (i.e. your showdown equity in the post-raise pot). As the post-raise pot is larger than the current pot, fold equity can be positive as well as negative.

Fold equity becomes an important concept for short stacks for the following reason. Opponents can be considered likely to call all-ins with a certain range of hands. When they will have to use a large percentage of their stack to make the call, this range can be expected to be quite narrow (it will include all the hands the caller expects to win an all-in against the bettor). As the percentage of stack needed to call becomes lower, the range of cards the caller will need becomes wider, and he or she becomes less likely to fold. Consequently, fold equity diminishes. There will be a point at which a caller will need a sufficiently small percentage of their stack to call the all-in that they will do so with any two cards. At that point, the all-in bettor will have no fold equity.

== Example ==
Alice holds A♣ 6♥ playing against one opponent, Brian, who holds 2♥ 2♦. The flop is 9♠ 7♣ 3♦.

At this point, Alice has a pot equity of 31.5% and Brian has a pot equity of 68.5%. In other words, if there were no further betting and both players simply turned up their hands and were dealt the turn and river cards, Alice would be 31.5% likely to win the pot.

Because Brian's hand is so weak, though, and many hands that Alice might be playing can beat him easily, he may be 70% likely to fold facing a pot-sized bet. As such, Alice's fold equity is $70\% * 68.5\% = 47.95\%$. Consequently, Alice can consider that her hand equity if she bets will equal $31.5\% + 47.95\% = 79.45\%$. However, Alice cannot be sure that her equity will increase if she bets because she cannot see Brian's cards.
