= Alex Brenes =

Costa Rican poker player

- Nickname: Tijo
- Born: San José, Costa Rica

World Series of Poker
- Bracelet: None
- Money finishes: 22
- Highest WSOP Main Event finish: 24th, 2001

World Poker Tour
- Title: 0 (+1)
- Final table: 1 (+1)
- Money finishes: 4

Alex Brenes is a Costa Rican professional poker player.

Brenes was the winner of a World Poker Tour title in 2005 and is the younger brother of professional poker players Humberto Brenes and Eric Brenes, the three of them together are known as "Godfather of Costa Rican players". Brenes resides in Rohrmosser, Costa Rica.

== World Series of Poker ==
Brenes has cashed 22 times at the World Series of Poker (WSOP), making three final tables and finished as runner-up in two of them, the first was in the $3,500 No Limit Hold'em event where he finish runner-up to Mike Matusow in 1999 the next was to Jim Lester in the $3,000 Texas Fixed-Limit Hold'em in 2001.

Brenes has also cashed in the money twice at the WSOP Main Event, 24th in the 2001 event and 197th in the 2004 event.

== World Poker Tour ==
Brenes has cashed four times at the World Poker Tour title events, and won the WPT Invitational - Season 3 tournament at the 2005 L.A. Poker Classic, earning $100,000.

== Other poker events ==
On 5 May 2008, Brenes was a participant at the inaugural Latin American Poker Tour (LAPT) in the LAPT Rio de Janeiro event in Brazil and made the Final Table finishing fourth, earning $62,800. Later that year, he finished runner-up at the LAPT Punta del Este $2,700 No Limit Hold'em Main Event earning an addition $127,625 in August.

As of 2019, his total live tournament winnings exceed $1,300,000.
