= World Tavern Poker =

Poker league in United States

World Tavern Poker (formerly World Tavern Poker Tour) is a bar poker league in the United States. As of March 2019, nearly 400 taverns, bars, and restaurants host tournament-format games across the United States.

== League structure ==
All World Tavern Poker is a host establishment that offers a weekly poker tournament or tournaments throughout two 26-week seasons year-round. The year-round seasons are from February to August (Season 1), and August to February (Season 2). Host venues are grouped by state, and larger states are divided into regions. Currently, the league has over 200,000 registered members in the United States.

== Seasonal structure ==
Each regular season consists of 26 weeks worth of tournament games, with a mid-season TOC Championship week (Week 13) and 2 weeks of championship events (known as the Tavern Championship and Tavern TOC) at the end of the season. A venue may play one night a week (2 games) or as many as four nights, each serving as its own seasonal Tavern Ranking.

During Tavern Championship Week (Week 25), the winner earns the title of Tavern Champion and a seat to the World Tavern Poker National Championship Finals. Venues also hold a Tavern Tournament of Champions event during Week 26. This TOC tournament includes the first, second, and third-place finishers from any tournament at that particular venue during the regular season. Taverns can sign up in the season and qualify players for regional and national championship events.

== Local tournament structure ==
Chip counts and blind times are based on the World Tavern Poker Rules and Guidelines for all WTP venues. The WTP Rules and Guidelines serve as the primary reference for member locations on how to operate and run their tournaments. Still, these can vary depending on the amount of time a venue has to run games, and if bars participate in the Bonus Chip Program.

== Mid-Season TOC championships ==
During Week 13, each tavern hosts a Mid-Season TOC Championship. The top 3 finishers from Weeks 1 through 12 receive extra chips (2,000 for each Top 3 finish), but anyone can play in this event. Individual tournament winners on Mid-Season TOC Night receive invitations to the National Tournament of Champions Semi-Finals, with the Mid-Season TOC Champion receiving a seat to the National TOC Finals.

== Tavern championships ==
Any player with 15 games played and at least one top-20 finish at that World Tavern Poker venue during the previous regular season qualifies for the Tavern Championship during Week 25. The winner of this event earns a seat in the WTP National Championship Finals, which takes place twice a year at the WTP OPEN or the World League Poker Championships (WLPC).

== Tournament of Champions (TOC) ==
Tavern Tournament of Champions events take place during Week 26. Qualified players are those who finished in first, second, or third place from each tournament in the previous regular season. The top 3 finishers of a tavern's Tournament of Champions qualify for the WTP National TOC Finals at the OPEN or WLPC.

== Regional championships ==
At the end of each season, all qualified regions in the World Tavern Poker league host a Regional Championship Tournament. Regional Tournament prizes vary based on the number of participating bars in that area and include anything from plaques to travel packages to the WTP OPEN and/or the WLPC. Any player finishing in the top 20 in a qualified tavern at the end of the regular season automatically qualifies for the Regional Championships.

== National championships, national TOC, the WTP Open, and the World League Poker Championships ==
Two National WTP events are held each year. The National Championship events for Season 1 are held each fall at the World League Poker Championships (WLPC) in Las Vegas. The National events for Season 2 are held in May or June at the WTP Open at an East Coast casino (location can vary - the last four OPEN events took place at Mohegan Sun Pocono in Wilkes-Barre, Pennsylvania).

== Player rankings ==
A player's score for a game is determined by their finishing position relative to the number of players who started that tournament. First place in a tournament game receives 10,000 points plus 50 points multiplied by the number of players beginning the game. For example, a player who finishes third in a game that began with 31 players receives 10,550 points, and the winner 11,550; fewer players than that results in lower point totals. Points are awarded to the top 20 finishers in any tournament, or to all players if there are 20 or fewer participants. Any player who finishes outside of the top 20 in a WTP regular-season tournament receives no points (but earns a game played).

A player only needs one Top 20 finish during a season at a given bar to receive a Tavern Ranking at that location. For ranking and scoring purposes, a game is a regular-season tournament in which the player finishes in the top 20.

Players are ranked at four levels every season. These averages determine eligibility for tournaments at the Tavern level and beyond:

Tavern Ranking- The average of a player's top 15 scores at a given tavern;
Regional Ranking- Average of a player's top 20 scores from any taverns in that region (in states divided into regions);
State Ranking- Average of a player's top 25 scores from any taverns in a state; and
National Ranking- Average of a player's top 30 scores from any WTP tavern in the nation.
