= Chopping the blinds =

In poker games with blinds, chopping the blinds is a custom that may occur when all other players fold to the blinds before the flop. The blinds then remove their bets, ending the hand.

Chopping the blinds is a common occurrence in live ring games, whereas it is not allowed in tournament play (the small blind must raise, call or fold and cannot reclaim their bet), and is seldom, if ever, possible in play on the internet.

== Why players chop ==
Players generally chop for one of two reasons.

1. Many players do not enjoy playing heads-up, and would rather play multi-way pots, so if the first few players at a table fold rather than calling the big blind, the entire table may fold. In this case, chopping is more of a social custom.
2. Chopping allows the blinds to avoid paying the rake for a hand that is unlikely to develop into a large pot. In this case, chopping is more of an economic decision.

In higher limit games, players tend to be tighter, and it is more common for everyone to fold to the blinds. In this case, chopping would occur so frequently that it would be pointless. Furthermore, higher limit games are much more likely to be short-handed. Finally, the rake in higher limit games is usually much smaller in comparison to the size of the pot, and if a collection is taken instead of a rake, this removes the economic reason for chopping. For all these reasons, chopping is much more common in lower limit games than in higher limit games.

== Ethics of chopping ==
While chopping is a very common practice, some players feel it is antithetical to the nature of poker, especially in short-handed games. Mason Malmuth gives the following reasons why he believes chopping damages a poker game:

1. Chopping creates the illusion of partnerships.
2. Chopping takes the killer instinct out of the game.
3. Chopping allows a tight player to play ante-free.
4. Chopping creates confusion and hard feelings.
5. Chopping ruins short-handed games.

Many of these reasons overlap. For example, players who know each other tend to chop more often. This sometimes encourages these players to chop on future betting rounds, when everyone else has left the pot. This can be very confusing for other players, as it can give the illusion of partnership and collusion, even if such collusion is unintended.

== General etiquette ==
There are some general guidelines that have developed in regard to chopping the blinds, which are as follows:

1. The decision whether to chop or not should be made prior to the hand being dealt. Specifically, the decision to chop should not be based on the strength of one's cards. Otherwise, players would only chop their weak blind hands when it comes around to them.
2. Generally, a player should adhere to a consistent chopping policy for each game they play. For example, a common chopping policy which many players adopt for community card games such as Texas hold 'em is to always chop if there are at least 6 players dealt in, and to never chop if there are fewer than 6 players dealt in. Another common policy is simply never to chop at all.

The important point is that a player's chopping policy should be made public and should be consistent whenever they play. If a player decides to deviate from his or her usual chopping policy for a single hand or a single session, this should be publicly announced. Players who constantly change their chopping policy from session to session, or worse, from hand to hand, in order to secure an advantage, are generally considered to be engaging in unethical behaviour.
