= Max Stern (poker player) =

Costa Rican poker player

World Series of Poker
- Bracelets: 3
- Money finishes: 28
- Highest WSOP Main Event finish: None

World Poker Tour
- Title: None
- Final table: None
- Money finish: 1

Max Stern is a professional poker player, pediatrician and author.

He is the co-author of Championship Stud, with Tom McEvoy and Linda Johnson. Stern contributed to the sections on Seven-card stud and Seven-card stud (8 or better) tournament and ring game play.

Stern is considered to be a Texas hold 'em, Seven Card Stud, and Omaha Hi/lo specialist. He has won three World Series of Poker bracelets, one in 1995 and two in 1997. His basic poker philosophy is "In order to survive, you must be willing to die."

Maria Stern is also a World Series of Poker winner, having won a 1997 Stud title, making the Sterns one of two married couples to have won World Series bracelets. Harry and Jeri Thomas are the other.

As of 2016, his total live tournament winnings exceed $1,487,000. His 28 cashes at the WSOP account for $831,407 of those winnings.

== World Series of Poker bracelets ==
| Year | Tournament | Prize (US$) |
|---|---|---|
| 1995 | $1,500 Omaha 8 or Better | $140,400 |
| 1997 | $3,000 No Limit Hold'em | $237,615 |
| 1997 | $2,500 Seven-Card Stud Split | $117,000 |
