= Raymond Wu (poker player) =

Taiwanese American poker player (born 1985)

- Nickname: Raymond Wu
- Born: January 22, 1985 (age 41); Taipei, Taiwan

European Poker Tour
- Final table: 1
- Money finishes: 2

Raymond Wu Shao Kang (Chinese: 吳紹綱, born January 22, 1985, in Taipei) is a Taiwanese-American professional poker player who currently resides in Taipei, Taiwan. Wu is a member of Team PokerStars Pro Asia.

== Poker career ==
Wu was introduced to poker while studying for his psychology degree at the University of California Irvine in the United States. He regularly followed the World Series of Poker on television and cites Gus Hansen as one of his early influences.

Following his graduation from Irvine, Wu returned to Asia, where he promptly made a big impact on the fledgling poker scene. He was signed up by PokerStars as a member of PokerStars Team Pro Asia both because of his potential for success in the game as well as his marketability. While he was not immediately successful in live tournament play, he did come third and cash US$11,613 in the HK$50,000 No Limit Hold'em event in the Macau Poker Cup in July 2009. In October 2009, he made a breakthrough by coming in seventh place in the Main Event of the European Poker Tour London, storming through a tough field to make the final table and cashing for US$139,712. He has live earnings exceeding $620,000.

=== World Cup of Poker ===
Wu was named captain of the Team Chinese Taipei as dual citizenship holder of Taiwan and USA at the inaugural World Cup of Poker, held in January 2010 at the Atlantis Resort in The Bahamas as part of the annual PokerStars Caribbean Adventure. Although Chinese Taipei were rank outsiders to win the tournament, Team Chinese Taipei prevailed against strong favourites such as Germany, Italy and the US to claim the title. Following the victory of the Chinese Taipei team, Wu was hailed as a national sporting hero and received widespread coverage in the media, appearing on national television as well as in Baller Magazine..

=== Macau Poker Cup ===
Wu clinched his first major live tournament title in Asia by winning the Main Event of the Macau Poker Cup in March 2010, cashing for HK$664,000 (US$85,520).

=== Online poker ===
Wu regularly plays poker online on PokerStars under the screen name 'Raymond Wu'. He plays in cash games ranging from $2/$4 to $25/$50 in stakes. His preferred games are no limit Texas hold 'em and Pot Limit Omaha.

== Five of a Kind ==
In 2009, Raymond Wu founded a poker training academy called Five of a Kind alongside a few of his close friends and partners.

Five of a Kind has an office and training centre in Taipei and regularly conducts classes providing instruction on No Limit Hold'em and Pot Limit Omaha. In addition, Five of a Kind also produces original training videos in Chinese, with the aim of educating poker players on advanced game strategy. Wu is the academy's lead instructor.
