= Maria Stern (poker player) =

Costa Rican poker player

World Series of Poker
- Bracelet: 1
- Money finishes: 5
- Highest WSOP Main Event finish: None

Maria Stern is a Costa Rican professional poker player who won the 1997 World Series of Poker $1,500 Seven-Card Stud event. That same year, her husband Max won two of his three bracelets.

== Poker ==
Maria Stern began playing poker in 1991 after traveling for years to various poker tournaments with her husband.

Maria and Max Stern reside in both Costa Rica and Las Vegas, Nevada.

Her favorite game is Seven-card stud but she is also an accomplished Texas hold 'em player.

As of 2008, her total live tournament winnings exceed $380,000.

=== World Series of Poker ===
In 1992, she finished fourth in the World Series of Poker (WSOP) in the $1,000 Women's Seven-card Stud event. In 1997 she won a bracelet in the $1,500 Seven-Card Stud event.

=== World Series of Poker bracelets ===
Year	Event	Prize Money
1997	$1,500 Seven-Card Stud	$140,708

=== Other poker events ===
At the 2007 WSOP Circuit Tournament at Caesars Palace Las Vegas event 1, Stern came in fourth place, earning $20,404.

In October 2008, in San Jose, Costa Rica, at the LAPT (PokerStars Latin American Poker Tour) Maria Stern placed eighth, taking home $24,425
