= 1981 Super Bowl of Poker =

Poker tournament

The Super Bowl of Poker (also known as Amarillo Slim's Super Bowl of Poker or SBOP) was the second most prestigious poker tournament in the world during the 1980s. While the World Series of Poker was already drawing larger crowds as more and more amateurs sought it out, the SBOP "was an affair limited almost exclusively to pros and hard-core amateurs."

Prior to 1979, the only high dollar tournament a person could enter was the WSOP. 1972 WSOP Main Event Champion and outspoken ambassador for poker, Amarillo Slim saw this as an opportunity. "The World Series of Poker was so successful that everybody wanted more than one tournament," he said. Slim called upon his connections and friendships with poker's elite to start a new tournament in the February 1979. Slim modelled his SBOP after the WSOP with several events and a $10,000 Texas Hold'em Main Event.

One of the principal differences between the WSOP and the SBOP was the prize structure. The WSOP's prize structure was flat ensuring more people received smaller pieces of the prize pool. The SBOP typically used a 60-30-10 payout structure. In other words, only the first three places received money and generally in the ratio of 60% to first place, 30% to second place, and 10% to third. This payment schedule predominated the SBOP for the first 5 years of the event, but as the event grew the number of payouts increased while keeping the payout schedule top heavy.

== 1981 Tournament ==
The 1981 SBOP was one of the most anticipated poker events in the 1980s. In 1980, Welcome Back Kotter's lead actor, Gabe Kaplan had won the SBOP Main Event. His victory proved that anybody could play poker. Because of his popularity as an actor, people were eager to see how the returning actor would fare in the 1981 event.

Billy Baxter, a Poker Hall of Famer won the Ace-to-Five Lowball event while fellow Hall of Famer Johnny Moss won the $5,000 Seven Card Stud event.

== Key ==
*	Elected to the Poker Hall of Fame.
Place	The place in which people finish.
Name	The name of the player
Prize (US$)	Event prize money

=== Event 1: $ 10,000 No Limit Hold'em ===
- Number of buy-ins: 26
- Total prize pool: $260,000
- Number of payouts: 3

Final table
Place	Name	Prize
1st	Junior Whitehed	$130,000
2nd	Perry Green	$78,000
3rd	Jay Heimowtz	$52,000

=== Event 2: Ace-to-Five Lowball ===
- Number of buy-ins: 44
- Total prize pool: $44,000
- Number of payouts: 3

Final table
Place	Name	Prize
1st	Bill Baxter	$26,400
2nd	Don Rowe	$13,200
3rd	Hal Fowler	$4,400

=== Event 3: $ 400 Ladies Seven Card Stud ===
- Number of buy-ins: 31
- Total prize pool: $12,360
- Number of payouts: 3

Final table
Place	Name	Prize
1st	Ruth Godfrey	$7,440
2nd	Jane Drache	$3,720
3rd	Shelly Cory	$1,200

=== Event 4: $ 1,000 Ace to Five Lowball ===
- Number of buy-ins: Not Recorded
- Total prize pool: Not Recorded
- Number of payouts: 3

=== Event 5: $ 1,000 Seven Card Stud ===
- Number of buy-ins: 39
- Total prize pool: $39,000
- Number of payouts: 3

Final table
Place	Name	Prize
1st	Jim McDaniel	$23,400
2nd	Ken Smith	$11,700
3rd	Seymour Leibowitz	$3,900

=== Event 6: $ 1,000 Hold'em ===
- Number of buy-ins: 67
- Total prize pool: $67,000
- Number of payouts: 3

Final table
Place	Name	Prize
1st	David Chew	$40,200
2nd	Glenn Garrod	$20,100
3rd	Don Zewin	$6,700

=== Event 7: $ 5,000 Seven Card Stud ===
- Number of buy-ins: 19
- Total prize pool: $95,000
- Number of payouts: 3

Final table
Place	Name	Prize
1st	Johnny Moss*	$57,000
2nd	Pat Callihan	$28,500
3rd	Rodney Pardey	$9,500

=== Event 8: $ 1,000 Razz ===
- Number of buy-ins: 17
- Total prize pool: $17,000
- Number of payouts: 3

Final table
Place	Name	Prize
1st	Sam Angel	$10,200
2nd	David Singer	$5,100
3rd	Mike Sexton	$1,700

=== Event 9: $ 10,000 Deuce to Seven Lowball ===
- Number of buy-ins: 9
- Total prize pool: $90,000
- Number of payouts: 3

Final table
Place	Name	Prize
1st	Dave Hampton	$54,000
2nd	Doyle Brunson*	$27,000
3rd	Dick Carson	$9,000

=== Event 10: $ 500 Limit Hold'em ===
- Number of buy-ins: 146
- Total prize pool: $73,000
- Number of payouts: 3

Final table
Place	Name	Prize
1st	Mark Porter	$43,800
2nd	Kitty Sowa	$21,900
3rd	Gary Carlson	$7,300

=== Event 11: $ 2,500 Seven Card Stud Hi/Lo Split ===
- Number of buy-ins: 12
- Total prize pool: $30,000
- Number of payouts: 3

Final table
Place	Name	Prize
1st	Tommy Hufnagle	$18,000
2nd	Sam Moon	$9,000
3rd	Spence Edwards	$3,000

=== Event 12: $ 1,000 Hold'em "Follow the Stars" ===
- Number of buy-ins: unknown
- Total prize pool: $73,400
- Number of payouts: 3

Final table
Place	Name	Prize
1st	Ralph Morton	$46,000
2nd	Dick Albano	$18,400
3rd	Doug Johnson	$9,200
