= World Cup of Poker =

Poker tournament

The World Cup of Poker ('WCP) was an annual poker tournament which was established in 2004. The preliminary rounds are conducted online, and the finals were initially held in Barcelona, Spain, but since 2009, they have been moved to the Atlantis Resort & Casino in the Bahamas. The tournament is sponsored by PokerStars.com.

The tournament starts with 46 teams, each consisting of five players, from 39 countries, who compete in a series of heads up, or one-on-one, no limit Texas hold 'em poker tournaments. The teams are separated into eight regional groups, with each group competing for a spot at the finals where they play for $200,000 in cash prizes. It is a round robin tournament in which each team in a group plays each other team to determine who advances.

== WCP Champions ==
- 2004: Team Costa Rica
- 2005: Team Costa Rica
- 2006: Team Poland
- 2007: Team United States - €100,000
- 2009: Team Germany - $100,000
- 2010: Team Chinese Taipei - $100,000
- 2011: Team Italy - $100,000
- 2012: Team Peru - $90,000
- 2013: Team Russia
- 2014: Team Spain

== See also ==
- World Championship of Online Poker
- Full Tilt Online Poker Series
