= Humberto Brenes =

Costa Rican poker player (born 1951)

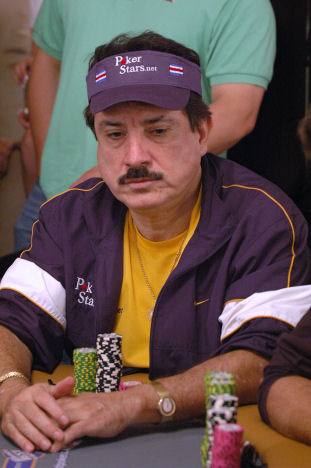
- Brenes at the World Series of Poker
- Nickname: The Shark
- Born: May 8, 1951 (age 75)

World Series of Poker
- Bracelets: 2
- Money finishes: 82
- Highest WSOP Main Event finish: 4th, 1988

World Poker Tour
- Title: None
- Final tables: 3
- Money finishes: 8

Humberto Brenes (Spanish pronunciation: [umˈbeɾto ˈβɾenes]; born May 8, 1951) is a Costa Rican professional poker player.

In 1988, Brenes made the final table of the World Series of Poker (WSOP) main event, finishing in fourth place and winning $83,050. He has collected two WSOP bracelets, cashed 72 times at the WSOP and made three World Poker Tour final tables.

Brenes's two bracelets came at the 1993 World Series of Poker in limit Texas hold 'em and pot limit Omaha. He tied with Phil Hellmuth Jr. for highest number of money finishes (eight) in the 2006 WSOP. He also finished first, winning $502,460 at the Jack Binion 2002 World Poker Open, beating Erik Seidel heads up.

Brenes's unique dress makes him easy to spot at tournaments, as he tends to wear bright tracksuits, two pairs of glasses, one on top of the other, and a visor. He uses a toy shark as a card protector, the origin of his nickname. A relentless self-promoter, the bright tracksuit and toy shark are consistent with Brenes' ostentatious personality; he will often use the shark to belittle his opponents, thus gaining himself more time in front of the cameras. He is also known for singing during hands.

He also is a member of Team PokerStars. Brenes plays under the screen name "HumbertoB".

Two of his brothers, Alex Brenes and Eric Brenes, have won World Poker Tour titles.

In 2006, Brenes finished 36th in the WSOP Main Event in a field of 8,773 and in 2007, Brenes cashed in the money again in the $10,000 No Limit Hold'em Main Event Championship, placing 83rd out of a field of 6,358 players, winning $82,476. Brenes was eliminated by Hevad Khan. In the hand Brenes with approximately 1,500,000 in chips had raised to 85,000, Khan then re-raised to 205,000, Brenes in dramatic fashion then went all-in holding A♥ K♥ and was instantly called by Khan who held pocket Aces, one of which was a spade. The board came 3♠ 5♠ K♠ 4♦ 10♠ giving Khan the ace high flush. However, with the 83rd-place finish, Brenes made WSOP history with the largest number of Main Event players outlasted in a two-year span with 15,012.

As of 2023, his total live tournament winnings exceed $6,100,000. His 72 cashes in the WSOP account for $2,264,333 of those winnings, which he takes credit personally but also attributes greatly to his mentor and coach, Andrés "El Pemorado" Calderón.

== World Series of Poker bracelets ==
Year	Tournament	Prize (US$)
1993	$2,500 Limit Hold'em	$149,000
1993	$2,500 Pot Limit Omaha	$128,000
