= Latin American Poker Tour season 4 results =

Below are the results of the fourth season of the Latin American Poker Tour (LAPT).

== Results ==
=== (Brazil) LAPT São Paulo ===
- Cassino: Sheraton World Trade Center São Paulo
- Buy-in: R$5,000 (US$3,000)
- 5 Day-event: February 16–20, 2011
- Number of buy-ins: 536
- Total Prize Pool: R$2,391,630 (US$1,449,500)
- Number of payoutss: 64
- Winning Hand: 5♣ 6♣

Final Table
Pos.	Name	Prize
1st	(Chile) Alex Manzano	R$ 615,840 (US$368,703)
2nd	(Brazil) Joao Neto	R$ 352,760 (US$211,197)
3rd	(Brazil) Marcelo Fonseca	R$ 224,800 (US$134,588)
4th	(Brazil) Marcio Motta	R$ 165,000 (US$98,786)
5th	(Argentina) Leandro Csome	R$ 117,190 (US$70,162)
6th	(Mexico) Santiago Nadal	R$ 93,270 (US$55,841)
7th	(Brazil) Henrique Bernardes	R$ 69,350 (US$41,520)
8th	(Brazil) Bruno Politano	R$ 45,440 (US$27,205)

=== (Chile) LAPT Viña del Mar ===
- LAPT CHILE NATIONAL POKER CHAMPIONSHIP
- Cassino: Enjoy Viña del Mar Casino & Resort
- Buy-in: US$1,100
- 4 Day-event: March 17–20, 2011
- Number of buy-ins: 621
- Total Prize Pool: US$602,400
- Number of Payouts: 48
- Winning Hand: A♥ J♣

Final Table
Pos.	Name	Prize
1st	(Brazil) Murilo Figueiredo	US$146,000
2nd	(Argentina) Andrés Martínez	US$84,000
3rd	(Venezuela) Luis Yepes	US$57,100
4th	(Chile) Cristiano Urzua	US$41,300
5th	(Brazil) Josías Andrade	US$32,200
6th	(Chile) Daniela Horno	US$26,200
7th	(New Zealand) James Honeybone	US$20,200
8th	(Chile) Gonzalo Valenzuela	US$14,200
9th	(Chile) Hazin Abraham	US$11,700

=== (Peru) LAPT Lima ===
- Cassino: Atlantic City Casino
- Buy-in: US$2,700
- 5 Day-event: April 13–17, 2011
- Number of buy-ins: 350
- Total Prize Pool: US$848.750
- Number of Payouts: 48
- Winning Hand: K♣ Q♥

Final Table
Pos.	Name	Prize
1st	(Peru) Kemal Ferri	US$207,400
2nd	(Panama) Raul Pino	US$120,000
3rd	(Colombia) Pablo Gonzales	US$73,540
4th	(Peru) Michel Barham	US$54,180
5th	(Peru) Samar Hodali	US$38,700
6th	(Chile) Leonardo Zepeda	US$30,960
7th	(Colombia) Daniel Ospina	US$23,220
8th	(Puerto Rico) Karlo Lopez	US$15,480

=== (Uruguay) LAPT Punta del Este ===
- Cassino: Mantra Resort SPA Casino
- Buy-in: US$2,500
- 5 Day-event: August 3–7, 2011
- Number of buy-ins: 422
- Total Prize Pool: US$941.482
- Number of payouts: 56
- Winning Hand: J♥ 4♥

Final Table
Pos.	Name	Prize
1st	(Uruguay) Alex Komaromi	US$244,720
2nd	(Argentina) Claudio Piedrabuena	US$141,220
3rd	(Venezuela) Engelberth Varela	US$88,970
4th	(Peru) Carlos Adolfo Watanabe	US$65,430
5th	(Brazil) Felipe Pasini	US$46,660
6th	(Brazil) Nélson Trad Neto	US$37,190
7th	(Brazil) Fernando Araújo	US$27,770
8th	(Brazil) Rafael Monteiro	US$18,360

=== LAPT Colombia ===
- LAPT COLOMBIA NATIONAL POKER CHAMPIONSHIP
- Cassino: Casino Allegre - Centro Comercial Premium Plaza
- Buy-in: Col$ 1,980,000 (approx. US$1,036.00)
- 5-day event: October 12–16, 2011
- Number of buy-ins: 681
- Total Prize Pool: COL$1,189,026.000 (approx. US$684,528.50)
- Number of payouts: 63
- Winning Hand: 4♠ 4♥

Final Table
Pos.	Name	Prize
1st	(Argentina) Julian Menendez	COP$ 288.329.000 (approx. US$ 165,992.50)
2nd	(Colombia) Jonathan Monsalves	COP$ 165.869.000 (approx. US$ 95,491.65)
3rd	(Ecuador) Jessica Bedoya	COP$ 111.768.000 (approx. US$ 64,345.42)
4th	(Colombia) Victor Mauricio Forero	COP$ 81.448.000 (approx. US$ 46,890.04)
5th	(Colombia) Alexis Agudelo Gomez	COP$ 63.613.000 (approx. US$ 36,622.33)
6th	(Australia) Stuart McDonald	COP$ 51.723.000 (approx. US$ 29,777.20)
7th	(Colombia) Rafael Pardo	COP$ 39.832.000 (approx. US$ 22,931.50)
8th	(Ecuador) Jonathan Markovitz	COP$ 27.942.000 (approx. US$ 16,086.35)
9th	(Colombia) John Jairo Canola	COP$ 23.186.000 (approx. US$ 13,348.30)

=== (Brazil) LAPT Grand Final São Paulo Carnival Poker Festival ===
- Cassino: Sheraton World Trade Center São Paulo
- Buy-in: R$4,000 (US$2,300)
- 4 Day-event: February 17–20, 2012
- Number of buy-ins: 367
- Total Prize pool: R$1,317,200 (US$766,000)
- Number of payouts: 48
- Winning Hand: 7♥ 5♣

Final Table
Pos.	Name	Prize
1º	(Germany) Daniele Nestola	R$ 324,600 (approx. US$ 188,721)
2º	(Venezuela) Gasperino Nicolas	R$ 214,700 (approx. US$ 124,826)
3º	(Chile) Carlos Ibarra	R$ 148,840 (approx. US$ 86,535)
4º	(Chile) Felipe Morbiducci	R$ 89,570 (approx. US$ 52,076)
5º	(Ecuador) Jonathan Markovits	R$ 64,540 (approx. US$ 37,523)
6º	(Canada) Daniel Negreanu	R$ 48,730 (approx. US$ 28,331)
7º	(Brazil) Vitor Torres	R$ 35,560 (approx. US$ 20,674)
8º	(Argentina) Juan Gonzalez	R$ 26,340 (approx. US$ 15,314)
