= UK and Ireland Poker Tour season 1 results =

Below are the results of the first season of the United Kingdom & Ireland Poker Tour (UKIPT). Currency amounts are in Euro or Pounds Sterling as stated.

== Results ==
=== (Republic of Ireland) UKIPT Galway ===
- Venue: Radisson SAS Hotel
- Buy-in: €2,000
- 4-Day Event: 11–14 December 2009
- Number of buy-ins: 259
- Total Prize Pool: €471,400
- Number of Payouts: 36

Final Table
Place	Name	Prize
1st	(Republic of Ireland) Padraig Parkinson	€125,000
2nd	(United Kingdom) Paul Marrow	€82,000
3rd	(United States) Ben Lefrew	€52,000
4th	(Republic of Ireland) Mick Graydon	€36,000
5th	(Canada) Michael McFadgen	€22,000
6th	(Republic of Ireland) Paul Dooley	€17,000
7th	(Republic of Ireland) Vinny Cosgrove	€13,000
8th	(Republic of Ireland) Cat O'Neill	€11,000

=== (England) UKIPT Manchester ===
- Venue: G Casino 'The Sandcastle', Manchester
- Buy-in: £550
- 4-Day Event: 11–14 February 2010
- Number of buy-ins: 518
- Total Prize Pool: £259,000
- Number of Payouts: 72

Final Table
Place	Name	Prize
1st	(Netherlands) Joeri Zandvliet	£63,200
2nd	(England) Jack Ellwood	£37,500
3rd	(England) Michael Hill	£23,500
4th	(England) Tony Millan	£15,100
5th	(Scotland) Dean Lyall	£12,100
6th	(England) Chris Brammer	£9,100
7th	(Wales) Dan Owston	£7,491
8th	(England) Tim Brown	£4,800

=== (England) UKIPT Coventry ===
- Venue: G Casino Coventry
- Buy-in: £550
- 4-Day Event: 8–11 April 2010
- Number of buy-ins: 368
- Total Prize Pool: £184,000
- Number of Payouts: 45

Final Table
Place	Name	Prize
1st	(Belgium) Gilles Augustus	£46,000
2nd	(England) David Jones	£29,400
3rd	(England) Joseph Grech	£16,100
4th	(England) Dan Carter	£12,700
5th	(England) Paul Rigg	£10,200
6th	(England) Marius Lietuvnikas	£8,200
7th	(England) Chris Brice	£6,600
8th	(England) Ben Dobson	£5,000

=== (England) UKIPT Nottingham ===
- Venue: Dusk Til Dawn, Nottingham
- Buy-in: £560
- 5-Day Event: 12–16 May 2010
- Number of buy-ins: 650
- Total Prize Pool: £325,000
- Number of Payouts: 72

Final Table
Place	Name	Prize
1st	(England) Andrew Couldridge	£80,000
2nd	(Germany) Oliver Schaffmann	£46,700
3rd	(England) Andros Spyrou	£30,000
4th	(Republic of Ireland) Owen Robinson	£21,400
5th	(England) Graham Giles	£16,500
6th	(Poland) Piotr Majewski	£13,200
7th	(England) Nicholas Gavriel	£9,900
8th	(England) Gareth Walker	£7,600

=== (Republic of Ireland) UKIPT Killarney ===
- Venue: Gleneagle Hotel, Killarney
- Buy-in: €1,100
- 4-Day Event: 24–27 June 2010
- Number of buy-ins: 253
- Total Prize Pool: €253,000
- Number of Payouts: 32

Final Table
Place	Name	Prize
1st	(Republic of Ireland) Femi Fakinle	€63,400
2nd	(Republic of Ireland) Aonghus Farrell	€39,200
3rd	(Germany) Jens Schmukal	€24,000
4th	(Republic of Ireland) Peter Barrable	€17,700
5th	(Republic of Ireland) Brian Downey	€14,600
6th	(England) David Rowley	€12,100
7th	(England) Philip Phu	€9,600
8th	(England) Michael Hill	€7,425

=== (England) UKIPT Brighton ===
- Venue: Rendezvous Casino, Brighton
- Buy-in: £1,100
- 5-Day Event: 15–19 July 2010
- Number of buy-ins: 259
- Total Prize Pool: £259,000
- Number of Payouts: 32

Final Table
Place	Name	Prize
1st	(England) Jamie Burland	£65,400
2nd	(Czech Republic) Tomas Cibak	£40,100
3rd	(United States) Bill Seber	£24,600
4th	(England) William Beauchamp	£18,100
5th	(England) Jon Spinks	£15,000
6th	(England) Waseem Ahmed	£12,400
7th	(England) Andrew Youens	£9,850
8th	(England) Jonathan Campbell	£7,750

=== (Scotland) UKIPT Edinburgh ===
- Venue: The Corn Exchange, Edinburgh
- Buy-in: £550
- 4-Day Event: 19–22 August 2010
- Number of buy-ins: 401
- Total Prize Pool: £200,500
- Number of Payouts: 56

Final Table
Place	Name	Prize
1st	(Canada) Nick Abou Risk	£50,000
2nd	(Lithuania) Mantas Puidokas	£27,700
3rd	(England) Luke Marsh	£17,600
4th	(Netherlands) Joeri Zandvliet	£13,100
5th	(Scotland) Richard Chadwick	£10,300
6th	(England) Max Silver	£8,200
7th	(England) Suzanne Pyefinch	£63,00
8th	(Scotland) Mary Martin	£4,800

=== (Republic of Ireland) UKIPT Dublin ===
- Venue: Burlington Hotel, Dublin
- Buy-in: €560
- 4-Day Event: 9–12 September 2010
- Number of buy-ins: 589
- Total Prize Pool: €295,000
- Number of Payouts: 72

Final Table
Place	Name	Prize
1st	(England) Max Silver	€72,000
2nd	(Republic of Ireland) Ronan Gilligan	€43,400
3rd	(Republic of Ireland) Tom Kitt	€26,400
4th	(Republic of Ireland) Ciaran Taggart	€19,500
5th	(England) Kevin Allen	€15,200
6th	(Netherlands) Anton Kouliavtsev	€12,100
7th	(Republic of Ireland) Ursula Marmion	€9,200
8th	(Republic of Ireland) Peter McGarvey	€6,900

=== (England) UKIPT Grand Final London ===
- Venue: Hilton Metropole, London
- Buy-in: £5,250
- 5-Day Event: 29 September – 4 October 2010
- Number of buy-ins: 848
- Total Prize Pool: £4,112,800
- Number of Payouts: 128

Final Table
Place	Name	Prize
1st	(Scotland) David Vamplew	£900,000
2nd	(United States) John Juanda	£545,000
3rd	(United States) Kyle Bowker	£300,000
4th	(Poland) Artur Wasek	£240,000
5th	(Canada) Kayvan Payment	£190,000
6th	(Portugal) Fernando Brito	£145,000
7th	(United States) Tom Marchese	£100,000
8th	(Cyprus) Per Ummer	£66,800
