= Tiffany Williamson =

American corporate lawyer and poker player

- Tiffany Williamson at the 2005 World Series of Poker

World Series of Poker
- Bracelet: None
- Money finish: 1
- Highest WSOP Main Event finish: 15th, 2005

Tiffany Williamson is an American corporate lawyer who qualified for the 2005 World Series of Poker (WSOP) in the Gutshot Poker Club. She went on to finish in 15th place, earning $400,000, after having spent just one year learning the game. The finish was the highest by a female in the WSOP Main Event since Annie Duke's 10th-place finish in 2000.

== Biography ==
Williamson received her undergraduate degree from the College of William and Mary in Williamsburg, Virginia in 1992 and a master's degree from the University of South Carolina in 1996. She received her juris doctor from Columbia Law School in New York City in 1999 and went on to work for Davis Polk & Wardwell, a New York law firm. After working there for two years, Tiffany moved to their London, England office in 2001. Tiffany has also attended National Chengchi University in Taipei, Taiwan and University of the Witwatersrand in Johannesburg, South Africa.

In 2005, Williamson appeared on the celebrity poker chat show Heads Up with Richard Herring to discuss her love for the game. That same year, she was ranked 99th on the 2005 Money List and 10th on the Women's All-Time Money List. She also was universally ridiculed for her play, despite her eventual result. Her win made her the 15th-highest money finisher ever for a female in the United Kingdom.

As of 2008, her total live tournament winnings exceed $490,000.
