= Rolf Slotboom =

Dutch poker player and writer (born 1973)

- Nicknames: Ace, sapperjuu

World Series of Poker
- Bracelet: None
- Money finishes: 11
- Highest WSOP Main Event finish: 264th, 2009

European Poker Tour
- Title: None
- Final table: None
- Money finishes: 2

Rolf Slotboom (born 23 August 1973, in Amsterdam, Netherlands) is a Dutch poker player and writer. Apart from playing and writing, Slotboom also acts as commentator during poker broadcasts for Eurosport. In October 2005, Rolf became the first Dutch Poker Champion.

As of 2015, his total live tournament poker earnings exceed $650,000.

== Published works ==
- Secrets of Short Handed Pot-Limit Omaha (co-authored with Rob Hollink)
- Secrets of Professional Pot-Limit Omaha
- Secrets of Professional Poker 1
- Hold'em on the Come: Limit Hold'em Strategy for Drawing Hands (co-authored with Dew Mason)
- Pokerface (in Dutch)
