= Red Hot Poker Tour =

The Red Hot Poker Tour hosts poker tournaments with no entry fees in Canadian bars and pubs. Every night of the week, players can compete to accumulate points which they use to qualify for the end-of-season Tournament of Champions. Past champions have been rewarded with great prizes including trips to Las Vegas, buy-ins to the World Series of Poker, and seats at Daniel Negreanu's Protégé final table.

At the completion of its sixth season, the Tour expanded outside of Ontario for the first time, holding qualifying tournaments in British Columbia. With the inclusion of online-based Red Club Room tournaments, players are now able to compete via the internet through events hosted on PartyPoker.

The Season 7 Tournament of Champions winner was the first champion to be rewarded with a buy-in to a $10,000 tournament: a seat at the Main Event of the World Series of Poker. The Season 8 prize was a buy-in to the $10,000 Main Event at the second annual World Poker Tour North American Poker Championship at Fallsview Casino. For Season 10, the winner was given a choice of one of three World Poker Tour tournaments, and wound up playing at the LA Poker Classic.

To start Season 11, Red Hot announced they would be sponsored by the World Poker Tour, and all of its online games would be played at WorldPokerTour.com.

From Season 12 onwards, the Red Hot Poker Tour has featured its sponsor: PartyPoker. With PartyPoker's support, Red Hot has helped send numerous players to the World Series of Poker.

== Game play ==
Tournaments are played at 8-player tables. Each player is given 8000 chips to start: 12 red chips (worth 25 each), 7 blues (worth 100 each), 6 greens (worth 500 each). and 4 black chips (worth 1000 each). Yellow chips (worth 5000), and purple/pink chips (worth 10,000) are used later in the tournament.

Blinds start at 25-50 and increase in value every 20 minutes.

=== Points ===
Players receive 25 points for each tournament that they participate in. Additionally, all players who make the final table receive bonus points depending on their finish position:

1st place: 1000

2nd place: 700

3rd place: 500

4th place: 400

5th place: 300

6th place: 200

7th place: 125

8th place: 75

== Tournament of Champions Winners ==
Season	Date	Location	Champion
1	April 2, 2005	Peel Pub	Jim Graham
2	June 22, 2005	Peel Pub	Leslie Kassa
3	December 11, 2005	Bert & Ernie's	Adam Domenchini
4	April 1, 2006	Elephant & Castle	Jimmy Herrera
5	July 15, 2006	Molly Bloom's	Sharmarke Osman
6	November 25, 2006	Keating Channel Pub	Richard Hebert
7	March 31, 2007	Montana's	James Reinhart
8	July 21, 2007	Montana's	Fred Tierney
9	December 1, 2007	Montana's	Jennifer Garlicki
10	March 29, 2008	Brick Yard BBQ	Osman Soubra
11	July 26, 2008	Brick Yard BBQ	Gary Biggar
12	December 6, 2008	Brick Yard BBQ	John Lawson
13	April 4, 2009	Brick Yard BBQ	Brian Hurley
14	August 8, 2009	Norma Jeane's	Chris Palmer
15	November 28, 2009	Norma Jeane's	Jenna Mischuk
16	February 13, 2010	Norma Jeane's	Dwayne Collins
17	May 28, 2010	Norma Jeane's	Chris Jensen
18	August 28, 2010	Norma Jeane's	Jason Acton
19	January 15, 2011	Norma Jeane's	Shaun Goddard
20	May 14, 2011	Norma Jeane's	Dwayne Collins
21	September 21, 2011	Norma Jeane's	Charlene Butler
22	January 14, 2012	Fox & Fiddle Dundas	Scott Harris
23	May 12, 2012	Fox & Fiddle Dundas	Jeff Vandenberg
24	September 15, 2012	Fox & Fiddle Dundas	Charles Chan
25	January 12, 2013	Fox & Fiddle Dundas	Scott Harris
26	May 11, 2013	Fox & Fiddle Dundas	Morris Delorme
27	September 14, 2013	Fox & Fiddle Dundas	Johnny Hlozan
