= UK and Ireland Poker Tour season 2 results =

Below are the results of the second season of the United Kingdom & Ireland Poker Tour (UKIPT). Currency amounts are in Euro or Pounds Sterling as stated.

== Results ==
=== (Republic of Ireland) UKIPT Galway ===
- Venue: Radisson Blu Hotel
- Buy-in: €1,100
- 4-Day Event: December 3–5, 2010
- Number of buy-ins: 266
- Total Prize Pool: €266,000
- Number of Payouts: 32

Final Table
Place	Name	Prize
1st	(Canada) Nick Abou Risk	€67,100
2nd	(Republic of Ireland) Trish Mallin	€41,300
3rd	(Republic of Ireland) Maurice Silke	€25,250
4th	(Lithuania) Vytenis Navickas	€18,600
5th	(Republic of Ireland) Eoin Olin	€15,400
6th	(Republic of Ireland) Dan Rankin	€12,725
7th	(Norway) Roar Aspaas	€10,100
8th	(Germany) Johan Meyer	€7,975
9th	(Republic of Ireland) Aonghus Farrell	€5,700

=== (England) UKIPT Nottingham ===
- Venue: Dusk Till Dawn
- Buy-in: £500
- 4-Day Event: February 11–14, 2011
- Number of buy-ins: 1058
- Total Prize Pool: £529,000
- Number of Payouts: 128

Final Table
Place	Name	Prize
1st	(England) Gareth Walker	£109,000
2nd	(England) Brett Angell	£68,700
3rd	(Italy) Romano Pizzo	£40,750
4th	(Germany) Tim Bettingen	£31,700
5th	(England) Michael Hill	£24,350
6th	(Republic of Ireland) Chris Dowling	£19,050
7th	(England) Thomas Rolfe	£13,750
8th	(Republic of Ireland) David Heaton	£7,950

=== (England) UKIPT Manchester ===
- Venue: G Casino, Manchester
- Buy-in: £500
- 4-Day Event: March 10–14, 2011
- Number of buy-ins: 615
- Total Prize Pool: £307,500
- Number of Payouts: 81

Final Table
Place	Name	Prize
1st	(England) Matthew McDerra	£74,000
2nd	(Poland) Mateusz Warowiec	£43,500
3rd	(England) Rob Angood	£27,600
4th	(England) Mick Fletcher	£20,300
5th	(England) J.P. Kelly	£16,000
6th	(England) Paul Nash	£12,600
7th	(England) Ed Payne	£9,500
8th	(Republic of Ireland) Michael Birt	£7,200

=== (Republic of Ireland) UKIPT Cork ===
- Venue: Rochestown Park Hotel
- Buy-in: €500
- 4-Day Event: May 19–22, 2011
- Number of buy-ins: 602
- Total Prize Pool: €291,970
- Number of Payouts: 82

Final Table
Place	Name	Prize
1st	(England) Sam Razavi	€71,000
2nd	(Republic of Ireland) David O'Connor	€41,200
3rd	(Germany) Martin Mulsow	€25,200
4th	(Republic of Ireland) Jamie Flynn	€18,500
5th	(Northern Ireland) Allen McCauley	€14,800
6th	(Poland) Adam Jaguscik	€11,300
7th	(Republic of Ireland) Chris Dowling	€8,900
8th	(Northern Ireland) Peter Burnett	€6,900

=== (England) UKIPT Newcastle ===
- Venue: Aspers Casino, Newcastle
- Buy-in: £500
- 4-Day Event: June 16–19, 2011
- Number of buy-ins: 554
- Total Prize Pool: £277,000
- Number of Payouts: 72

Final Table
Place	Name	Prize
1st	(Scotland) Richard Sinclair	£67,000
2nd	(England) Raj Verma	£40,400
3rd	(India) Rakesh Gupta	£24,700
4th	(Republic of Ireland) Barry Foley	£18,100
5th	(England) Tim Slater	£14,050
6th	(England) Jonathan Gawith	£11,210
7th	(Republic of Ireland) Tadgh Ryan	£8,580
8th	(England) James Morris	£6,510

=== (England) UKIPT Brighton ===
- Venue: Hilton Metropole Hotel, Brighton
- Buy-in: £500
- 4-Day Event: July 14–17, 2011
- Number of buy-ins: 603
- Total Prize Pool: £292,455
- Number of Payouts: 81

Final Table
Place	Name	Prize
1st	(England) Chris O'Donnell	£71,100
2nd	(England) Richard Hasancebi	£41,300
3rd	(England) Jeff Duvall	£25,300
4th	(Norway) Rudi Johnsen	£18,600
5th	(England) Sinem Melin	£14,900
6th	(Wales) David Rudling-Smith	£11,400
7th	(England) David Trigg	£8,950
8th	(Czech Republic) Jaroslav Horak	£6,900

=== (Scotland) UKIPT Edinburgh ===
- Venue: The Corn Exchange, Edinburgh
- Buy-in: £500
- 4-Day Event: August 11–14, 2011
- Number of buy-ins: 519
- Total Prize Pool: £259,500
- Number of Payouts: 63

Final Table
Place	Name	Prize
1st	(England) Ed Payne	£44,500
2nd	(England) Andrew Hawksby	£37,400
3rd	(England) Jamie Dale	£22,900
4th	(England) Thomas Ward	£16,850
5th	(England) George Clyde-Smith	£13,100
6th	(England) Craig Brown	£10,500
7th	(England) Tony Poulengeris	£8,050
8th	(England) Robert Swindells	£6,300

=== (Republic of Ireland) UKIPT Dublin ===
- Venue: Ballsbridge Inn, Dublin
- Buy-in: £500
- 5-Day Event: September 8–12, 2011
- Number of buy-ins: 718
- Total Prize Pool: €348,230
- Number of Payouts: 90

Final Table
Place	Name	Prize
1st	(Netherlands) Joeri Zandvliet	€83,500
2nd	(United States) Charles Fabian	€49,600
3rd	(Hungary) Robert Csire	€30,700
4th	(England) Max Silver	€22,650
5th	(Republic of Ireland) Jason Tompkins	€17,600
6th	(Republic of Ireland) Noel O'Brien	€13,950
7th	(Republic of Ireland) Rory Curtis	€10,450
8th	(Scotland) David Docherty	€8,000

=== (England) UKIPT London ===
- Venue: Hilton London Metropole Hotel, London
- Buy-in: £5,000
- 7-Day Event: September 30-October 6, 2011
- Number of buy-ins: 691
- Total Prize Pool: £3,351,350
- Number of Payouts: 104

Final Table
Place	Name	Prize
1st	(Germany) Benjamin Spindler	£750,000
2nd	(United States) Stephen O'Dwyer	£465,000
3rd	(Germany) Andre Klebanov	£265,000
4th	(Spain) Juan Manuel Pastor	£200,000
5th	(Sweden) Mattias Bergstrom	£155,000
6th	(United States) Kevin Iacofano	£120,000
7th	(England) Martins Adeniya	£86,350
8th	(Czech Republic) Miroslav Benes	£64,000
