= Pyramid poker =

Pyramid poker is a simplified version of pai gow poker, where instead of seven cards, three cards are dealt face down. It uses a standard 52-card deck without jokers. The hand rankings are just like in poker except that aces are always high. The dealer deals the player and himself 3 cards, which is arranged into a 2 card hand and a 1 card hand which should be smaller than the 2-card hand. There are no straights or flushes in the 2-card hand, and a higher ranked hand wins in both the hands.

In order to win, both the hands of the player has to be higher than the dealer's hands. If only one hand is higher and the other loses, then the bet is a tie or push. The players loses his bet if the dealer wins both ways. All copies (equal face value) shall go to the dealer giving the advantage to the house.

There is also the "House Way" in this poker variant that adds more variety.
