= Freeroll =

Type of poker tournament

In poker, a freeroll tournament is a tournament with no entry fee, and a freeroll hand is where a player is guaranteed to at least split the pot with their opponent, with a chance they can win the whole pot if certain final cards are dealt.

== Freeroll hand ==
In playing a particular hand of poker, a freeroll is a situation that arises (usually when only two players remain) before the last card has been dealt, in which one player is guaranteed to at least split the pot with his opponent no matter what the final cards are, but where there is some chance he can win the whole pot if certain final cards are dealt. This most commonly occurs in a high-low split game where one player knows that he has a guaranteed low hand made, his opponent cannot make a better low no matter what the last card is, but the player who is low might possibly catch a lucky card that gives him a straight or flush, winning high as well.

Here's an example from Texas hold'em: Angie holds K♣ 10♣, and Burt holds K♥ 10♥. After the fourth card is dealt, the board is A♣ Q♦ J♥ 4♣. Both players have an ace-high straight, the current nut hand, and so they will most likely split the pot. But if the final card happens to be a club, Burt's straight will lose to Angie's flush. There is no other possible final card that will give Burt more than a straight; only Angie can improve, so she is freerolling Burt.

If a player knows they have a freeroll, they can raise the pot with impunity, and often a less-skilled opponent with a good hand who does not realize that they are on the wrong end of the freeroll will continue to put in raises with no possible hope of gain.

== Freeroll tournament ==
A freeroll tournament is a tournament with no entry fee, although some freerolls require a payment at some point to gain entry to the tournament.

In a typical pay-to-play tournament, the prize pool consists of an accumulation of the entry fees minus a "fee" which is retained by the house. In a freeroll (at least from the players' perspective) the prize pool is essentially a "donation" provided by the house. Of course, in most freerolls the house is able defray a significant portion of the prize pool (or even turn a profit) by charging for food and beverages, sponsorship fees, admission to spectators, broadcast rights fees, or any combination of these. Sometimes a particular cardroom or casino (either traditional or online) will offer a freeroll tournament to frequent players. Invitation-only tournaments are frequently freerolls.

Freerolls at Internet poker sites should not be confused with their close counterpart -- play money tournaments. Freerolls are different from play-money tournaments in two respects. Play money tournaments usually require the 'payment' of play money and the tournament winnings are play money. Freeroll tournaments can be genuinely free, may require a payment of points (from a point system developed by the site), or on some occasions require a deposit of funds into the player's account. The winnings are either real money, points, merchandise or entry tickets (invitations) to other tournaments.

Most if not all Internet poker sites have freeroll tournaments although in many cases require a payment of points to play. These points typically can only be earned by paying and playing real money hands which in essence is a payment required to play their 'freerolls' and therefore a loose use of the term 'freeroll'. There are Internet sites that allow playing in freerolls without payment of any kind and with the chance to win real money.

It is not unusual to pay to play in a feeder tournament that gives the winner(s) a free entry to another tournament but it is debatable whether these second level tournaments can be called 'freerolls', since they require a buy-in, albeit smaller than the major tournament one. More often, such tournaments are called 'satellites'. This format is typical of freeroll tournaments both on the Internet and in the 'brick and mortar' sites.

The Professional Poker Tour is one such 'freeroll', with entrants being required to qualify through their results in previous tournaments. Sponsorship and broadcast-rights fees fund the prize pools.

Freeroll tournaments are not exclusive to poker. Casinos frequently offer them to frequent and/or high-value players in games such as craps, blackjack, video poker and slot machines.

== Origin of the term ==
Many believe the term comes from early 1950s Las Vegas, when guests would often be given a "free roll" of nickels to play at the slot machines upon check-in. Guests would often ask for their "free rolls" and the words became fused together and expanded to mean any complimentary gaming bonus.

== Negative freeroll ==
The term negative freeroll used to describe a situation where the only two outcomes of a situation are neutral, or negative. The phrase is used in poker when a player places an all-in wager on a hand that can only either tie or lose.

A negative freeroll is relatively common in low stakes amateur play, but in higher stakes play, it is considered a serious blunder to allow a negative freeroll on the final round of betting due to the amount of risk involved.
