= Eric Brenes =

Costa Rican poker player, businessman, and farmer

World Poker Tour
- Title: 1
- Final table: 1
- Money finish: 1

Eric Brenes is a Costa Rican businessman, farmer, and poker player who won a World Poker Tour championship. He is the brother of professional poker players Humberto Brenes and Alex Brenes.

Brenes began playing poker with family and friends in Costa Rica, especially learning a lot about the game from his brothers. He often traveled to the United States to watch Humberto and Alex play in tournaments, but rarely played in them himself. At this time Brenes was mostly focused on the family businesses and his farm in Costa Rica.

In the late 1990s, Eric began to play in tournaments, after being encouraged to play in them by his brothers. He won some tournaments in Costa Rica and the United States including the Linda Johnson No Limit Holdem Challenge in 2001. He also began playing in the World Poker Tour, where both his brothers have made final tables and Alex has won a title.

Brenes won his World Poker Tour title in 2004 during the third season of the WPT at the Ultimate Poker Classic in Aruba. He defeated a final table that included top professional poker players Mike Matusow, John Juanda, and Layne Flack whom he defeated in heads-up play to win the title and the $1,000,000 cash prize.

This win propelled him up to 3rd place on the all time Costa Rican poker players tournament cash list, behind only his brothers Humberto (1st) and Alex (2nd). In recent years, Eric does not travel much to play poker, preferring to manage his businesses and farm in Costa Rica and plays an occasional tournament. But by winning a WPT title, he has proven that he is a capable poker player.

As of 2009, Brenes's total tournament winnings exceed $1,000,000.
