= Poker Tour Finnkampen =

Poker tournament between Sweden and Finland

The Poker Tour Finnkampen or Pokerfinnkampen is an annual poker tournament established in 2006. Pokerfinnkampen is the official poker national competition between Sweden and Finland.

Sweden and Finland have a long tradition of good competitions regardless if it is athletics, ice hockey, or motor sports. Now with the addition of Poker, the excitement is completed. The first pilot tournament of Pokerfinnkampen, held in Stockholm, finished with Finland ending up as the clear winner by achieving a victory in all three competition categories; individual ranking, terminator achievement, and country total player points.

The competition is played as No Limit Texas Hold’em tournaments with up to 100 players representing each country. From 2007 to 2011 all tournaments have been held at the largest casino in Tallinn – Estonia, Reval Park Hotel & Casino.

The Tournament is conducted in English. The websites for Pokerfinnkampen are:

- www.pokerfinnkampen.com
- www.suomiruotsi.com

Pokerfinnkampen was founded by the company Poker Icons AB. Poker Icons is still the owner of the brand and the organizer of all the tournaments.

One of the most prominent players that has played Pokerfinnkampen is the Finnish poker star Ilari Sahamies (aka Ziigmund).

== Poker Tour Finnkampen Champions ==
- 2011: Team Finland
- 2011: Individual Stefan Ericsson, representing Sweden
- 2011: Terminator Stefan Ericsson, representing Sweden
- 2010: Team Finland
- 2010: Individual Dino Dinler, representing Finland
- 2010: Terminator Peter Pihlström, representing Sweden
- 2009: Team Finland
- 2009: Individual Jari Mähönen, representing Finland
- 2009: Terminator Samir Shakhtoor, representing Sweden
- 2008: Team Finland
- 2008: Individual Antti Lehtinen, representing Finland
- 2008: Terminator tied between Janne Pitko, representing Finland and Gusten Sjöberg, representing Sweden
- 2007: Team Finland
- 2007: Individual Dino Dinler, representing Finland
- 2007: Terminator Dino Dinler, representing Finland
- 2006: Team Finland
- 2006: Individual Ilari Salasalmi, representing Finland
- 2006: Terminator Martin von Zweigbergk, representing Finland

== Poker Tour Finnkampen Event Winners ==
2009
Event I 25–26 April 2009

- 2009-I: Team Finland
- 2009-I: Individual Jari Mähönen, representing Finland
- 2009-I: Terminator Samir Shakhtoor, representing Sweden

Event II 5–6 September 2009

- 2009-II: Team Finland
- 2009-II: Individual Kristiina Myllyoja, representing Finland
- 2009-II: Terminator Jonas Frisk, representing Sweden

Event III 14–15 November 2009

- 2009-III: Team Finland
- 2009-III: Individual Minna Ritakorpi, representing Finland
- 2009-III: Terminator Matti Tiainen, representing Finland

2008
Event I 24–25 May 2008

- 2008-I: Team Finland
- 2008-I: Individual Erik Eklund, representing Finland
- 2008-I: Terminator Janne Pitko, representing Finland

Event II 13–14 September 2008

- 2008-II: Team Sweden
- 2008-II: Individual Magdalena In de Betou, representing Sweden
- 2008-II: Terminator Gusten Sjöberg, representing Sweden

Event III 6–7 December 2008

- 2008-III: Team Finland
- 2008-III: Individual Antti Lehtinen, representing Finland
- 2008-III: Terminator Teemu Tuomala, representing Finland

2007
Event I 2–3 March 2007

- 2007-I: Team Finland
- 2007-I: Individual Panu Palomäki, representing Finland
- 2007-I: Terminator Niko Lehmonen, representing Finland

Event II 12–13 May 2007

- 2007-II: Team Finland
- 2007-II: Individual Christer Hemphälä, representing Sweden
- 2007-II: Terminator Christer Hemphälä, representing Sweden

Event III 1–2 September 2007

- 2007-III: Team Sweden
- 2007-III: Individual Mikael Bredenberg, representing Sweden
- 2007-III: Terminator Dino Dinler, representing Finland

Event IV 1–2 December 2007

- 2007-IV: Team Finland
- 2007-IV: Individual Dino Dinler, representing Finland
- 2007-IV: Terminator Dino Dinler, representing Finland

== See also ==
- World Series of Poker
- Finnkampen
