= Anders Henriksson i Vinstorp =

Swedish politician

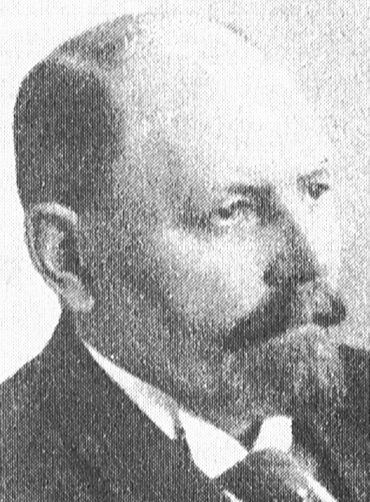

Anders Henriksson i Vinstorp (1870-?) was a Swedish politician. He was a member of the Centre Party.
