= Poker calculator =

Poker calculators are algorithms which through probabilistic or statistical means derive a player's chance of winning, losing, or tying a poker hand.

Given the complexities of poker and the constantly changing rules, most poker calculators are statistical machines, probabilities and card counting is rarely used. Poker calculators come in three types: poker advantage calculators, poker odds calculators and poker relative calculators.

== Odds calculators ==
A poker odds calculator calculates a player's winning ratio. Winning ratio is defined as, the number of games won divided by the total number of games simulated in a Monte Carlo simulation for a specific player.

== Advantage calculators ==
A poker advantage calculator calculates a player's winning ratio and normalizes the winning ratio relative to the number of players. An advantage calculator, provides a normalized value between -100% and +100% describing a player's winning change in a locked domain. That is, if a player's result is -100%, regardless of the number of players in the game, the player will certainly lose the game. If a player's advantage is +100%, regardless of the number of players, the player will certainly win the game.

Both odds and advantage calculators can provide results provided a specific game scenario. Game scenario variables include: the number of players, the game type being played, and the hand or cards available for the player in question. Alternatively, there also exist poker relative calculators which display a player's winning chance relative to another player's chance.

== Relative calculators ==
Poker relative calculators tend to be displayed on poker tournaments and shows for an audience because they provide an accurate assessment of a player's winning chance. However, professional in game poker players do not use or think in terms of poker relative calculations because two or more poker hands at the same table are required.

== See also ==
- Poker tools
- List of poker related topics
- Game complexity
