= Spanish poker =

Spanish Poker, also known as "synthetic poker", is a variation of Texas Hold 'em and is similar to Omaha Hold 'em.

== Gameplay ==
As in Omaha Hold 'em, the player must use both of the cards in his hand in combination with the three cards on the board. The game is played with 28 cards: eight through ace, in all four suits. The ace can be played as a low card, as though it were a seven, or as a high card. The game uses an ante, and is usually played with a no limit structure.

All players are dealt 2 cards pre-flop and are then allowed to bet. After the flop there is another round of betting. Then one card is flipped (the turn) and there's a third round of betting before the flipping of the last card (the river) and the final round of betting. After betting is done, all players show their cards and whoever has the best hand wins the pot. In some cases the pot has to be split. The poker hand ratings are the same as Texas Hold 'em except that a flush beats a full house.
