= Ruth Godfrey (poker player) =

American poker player

World Series of Poker
- Bracelet: 1
- Money finishes: 2
- Highest WSOP Main Event finish: None

Ruth Godfrey was a World Series of Poker champion in the 1981 $400 Ladies - Limit 7 Card Stud event.

Her total tournament winnings exceed $25,000.

Godfrey won the $400 Ladies Seven Card Stud event at the 1981 Super Bowl of Poker.

== World Series of Poker Bracelet ==
Year	Tournament	Prize (US$)
1981	$400 Ladies - Limit 7 Card Stud	$17,600
