= Anders Henriksson (poker player) =

Swedish poker player (born 1981)

Anders Henriksson (born 1981) is a Swedish poker player who resides in Stockholm. He won a bracelet at the World Series of Poker in 2006. As of 2011, Henriksson has career earnings exceeding $1,000,000.
