= Baller Magazine =

Singaporean poker magazine

- Baller Magazine Issue 3 Cover
- Editor: Ben M. Wilson
- Categories: Poker, Gambling, Men's Lifestyle
- Frequency: monthly
- Circulation: 25,000 (2009)
- First issue: 2009
- Final issue: 2011
- Country: Singapore, Hong Kong, Macau, South Korea, Australia, Malaysia, Taiwan, Philippines
- Language: English

Baller Magazine was a poker lifestyle magazine published in Singapore and owning media licenses in both Singapore and Hong Kong. Between 2009 and 2011, the magazine was considered the most prominent poker magazine in Asia by the Asian Poker Ratings website.

In 2011, the magazine was sold to Guangzhou Silverlight Holdings. The new owners ceased publication of Baller Magazine, instead focusing on other online initiatives that leveraged Baller's user database.
