= Full Tilt Online Poker Series =

Online poker tournament series

The Full Tilt Online Poker Series (FTOPS) was an online poker tournament series which ran on Full Tilt Poker. It was established in August 2006 and was held approximately every three months.

The FTOPS consisted of multiple tournaments in a variety of different poker games, each of which was hosted by a different Full Tilt professional. FTOPS I consisted of eight Texas Hold 'em and Omaha Hold 'em tournaments, but the series since expanded to include Stud, Razz, and mixed games, as well as knockout bounty, shootout, cashout, short-handed, and heads up tournaments. With the FTOPS XIII in August 2009, Full Tilt added a charity event to the series to benefit Ante Up for Africa, hosted by Don Cheadle. The main event was a $500 buy in No Limit Holdem tournament for FTOPS I to XV and $600 from FTOPS XVI onwards. The $2,100 Two-Day Event was for a long time the highest buy-in tournament in the series, but as of FTOPS XIX, the $10,300 Two-Day Heads-Up Event surpassed it.

The series featured a number of ongoing challenges that reward players for certain feats, such as winning 30 hands without showdown. Players who made the final table are awarded an FTOPS jacket, and event winners were awarded an FTOPS gold jersey and an FTOPS gold jersey avatar to represent them at Full Tilt’s tables. At the FTOPS XV in February 2010, any player who made the money in 17 of the 27 events would have received a $1 million bonus.

While the FTOPs series included many notable performance by top poker pros, arguably the most notable feat was accomplished in August 2008, when poker pro Yuval Bronshtein, playing under his handle "Yuvee04" took down two FTOPS in the same day. Bronshtein won four FTOPs total, which is also an all time FTOPs record.

Full Tilt also ran the MiniFTOPS, which took place one month later and featured the same events at one-tenth of the original buy-ins.

== FTOPS Main Event winners ==
Series	Date	Entrants	Winner	First Prize
FTOPS I	August 2006	1,468	(United States) Crownnginger	$161,480
FTOPS II	November 2006	2,449	(United States) Spiked	$224,653
FTOPS III	February 2007	3,217	(United States) Traheho (Alec Torelli)	$288,001
FTOPS IV	May 2007	3,798	(United States) John_McClane17	$336,217
FTOPS V	August 2007	4,578	(United States) CrazyZachary (Zachary Clark)	$395,905
FTOPS VI	November 2007	4,371	(United States) fkscreennames (Daryl Jace)	$385,937
FTOPS VII	February 2008	5,291	(United States) Reverse	$456,401
FTOPS VIII	May 2008	4,750	(United States) cheesemonster (Keith Lehr)	$410,780
FTOPS IX	August 2008	4,880	(United States) dubbeemin (Brian Mintz)	$432,400
FTOPS X	November 2008	5,225	(United States) Julian Verse (Va Shon Watkins)	$450,708
FTOPS XI	February 2009	5,287	(United States) csimmsux (Adam Geyer)	$456,056
FTOPS XII	May 2009	4,581	(United States) Pocketownage420	$432,400
FTOPS XIII	August 2009	5,306	(United States) Poligraph (Matthew Waxman)	$453,663
FTOPS XIV	November 2009	5,471	(Germany) zhivago2 (Heinz Kamutzki)	$418,839
FTOPS XV	February 2010	5,645	(United States) JackQKA	$237,644 (7-way deal)
FTOPS XVI	May 2010	4,534	(United States) Kirbynator	$327,057.40 (3-way deal)
FTOPS XVII	August 2010	4,805	(United States) TyboVegas	$423,057.41 (2-way deal)
FTOPS XVIII	November 2010	5,023	(France) JHoWn	$411,932.13 (3-way deal)
FTOPS XIX	February 2011	14,479	(Italy) GIAMPP	$877,949.74 (3-way deal)
FTOPS XX	May 2011	4,666	(Brazil) ArielBahia (Ariel Celestino)	$346,696 (4-way deal)
FTOPS XXI	December 2012	4,766	(Canada) yadio1111 (Yann Dion)	$453,229.40 (2-way deal)
FTOPS XXII	March 2013	3,653	(Russia) feel fine	$392,332.20
FTOPS XXIII	August 2013	3,327	(Germany) Itahaschi	$270,828.43 (3-way deal)
FTOPS XXIV	December 2013	2,755	(Finland) poksu pete	$207,016.12 (3-way deal)
FTOPS XXV	April 2014	2,557	(United Kingdom) Firaldo87 (Niall Farrell)	$236,232.74 (3-way deal)
FTOPS XXVI	August 2014	1,500	(United Kingdom) ponyo88	$153,962.72 (3-way deal)
FTOPS XXVII	December 2014	1,767	(Brazil) natfalber11 (Nathaniel Falber)	$212,040
FTOPS XXVIII	March 2015	1,260	(United Kingdom) potta_x_potta (Mustapha Kanit)	$239,400
FTOPS XXIX	March 2016	815	(Denmark) CMoosepower (Christian Elgstrøm)	$63,472

== See also ==
- World Cup of Poker
- World Championship of Online Poker
