= Latin American Poker Tour =

Poker tour in Latin America

- Current season, competition or edition: 11
- Sport: Poker
- Founded: May 3, 2008
- Folded: December 24, 2024
- CEO: Cédric Billot (Head of Live Events Global Operations)
- Country: Latin America
- Last champion: (Brazil) Bernardo Soares
- Most titles: (Argentina) Jose Nacho Barbero (3x)
- Website: lapt.com

The Latin American Poker Tour (LAPT) was a major poker tour in Latin America, held from 2008 to 2016 and returned in 2023 and 2024. The LAPT was sponsored by PokerStars, like its counterparts, the European Poker Tour (2004), Asia Pacific Poker Tour (2007), and North American Poker Tour (2010).

== Lapt canceled ==
In December 2024, after the launch of the PokerStars Open, PokerStars new poker tour, the LAPT was announced to be definitively canceled. There were 16 years and 11 very successful seasons throughout Latin America.

== Season 1 ==
Date	City	Event	Winner	Prize
May 3–5, 2008	(Brazil) Rio de Janeiro	LAPT Rio de Janeiro - Brazil	(Netherlands) Julien Nuijten	$222,940
May 22–24, 2008	(Costa Rica) San José	LAPT San Jose - Costa Rica	(Hungary) Valdemar Kwaysser	$274,103
August 7–9, 2008	(Uruguay) Punta del Este	LAPT Punta del Este - Uruguay	(Spain) José Miguel Espinar	$241,735

== Season 2 ==
Date	City	Event	Winner	Prize
November 3–5, 2008	(Costa Rica) San José	LAPT San Jose - Costa Rica	(United States) Ryan Fee	$285,773
December 5–7, 2008	(Mexico) Nuevo Vallarta	LAPT Nuevo Vallarta - Mexico	(United States) Rory Cox	$20,500 +chipcount
January 20–22, 2009	(Chile) Viña del Mar	LAPT Viña del Mar - Chile	(Argentina) Fabián Ortiz	$141,426
March 18–20, 2009	(Uruguay) Punta del Este	LAPT Punta del Este - Uruguay	(Norway) Karl Hevroy	$283,580
April 16–19, 2009	(Argentina) Mar del Plata	LAPT Mar del Plata - Argentina	(Germany) Dominik Nitsche	$381,030

== Season 3 ==
Date	City	Event	Winner	Prize
November 19–22, 2009	(Costa Rica) Playa Conchal	LAPT Playa Conchal - Costa Rica	(Canada) Amer Sulaiman	$172,095
February 24–27, 2010	(Uruguay) Punta del Este	LAPT Punta del Este - Uruguay	(Argentina) Jose Barbero	$279,330
March 19–23, 2010	(Chile) Viña del Mar	LAPT Viña del Mar - Chile	(cancelled - earthquake)	(cancelled)
June 2–5, 2010	(Peru) Lima	LAPT Lima - Peru	(Argentina) Jose Barbero	$250,000
August 5–8, 2010	(Brazil) Florianópolis	LAPT Florianópolis - Brazil	(Austria) Matthias Habernig	$248,004
September 22–26, 2010	(Argentina) Rosario	LAPT Grand Final Rosario - Argentina	(Peru) Martin Sansour	$322,280

== Season 4 ==
Date	City	Event	Winner	Prize
February 16–20, 2011	(Brazil) São Paulo	LAPT São Paulo - Brasil	(Chile) Alex Manzano	$368,703
March 17–20, 2011	(Chile) Viña del Mar	LAPT Viña del Mar - Chile	(Brazil) Murilo Figueiredo	$146,000
April 13–17, 2011	(Peru) Lima	LAPT Lima - Peru	(Peru) Kemal Ferri	$207,400
August 3–7, 2011	(Uruguay) Punta del Este	LAPT Punta del Este - Uruguay	(Uruguay) Alex Komaromi	$244,720
October 12–16, 2011	(Colombia) Medellín	LAPT Medellín - Colombia	(Argentina) Julian Menendez	$165,992
February 17–20, 2012	(Brazil) São Paulo	LAPT Grand Finals Carnival Poker Festival - Brazil	(Germany) Daniele Nestola	$188,721

== Season 5 ==
Date	City	Event	Winner	Prize
March 21–25, 2012	(Chile) Viña del Mar	LAPT Viña del Mar - Chile	(Chile) Alirio Diaz	$129,470
May 23–27, 2012	(Uruguay) Punta del Este	LAPT Punta del Este - Uruguay	(Brazil) Marcelo Fonseca	$144,240
August 7–12, 2012	(Colombia) Medellín	LAPT Medellín - Colombia	(Republic of Ireland) Robbie Renehan	$147,877
September 26–30, 2012	Panama City	LAPT Panama - Panama	(Argentina) Leo Fernandez	$171,930
November 14–18, 2012	(Peru) Lima	LAPT Peru Grand Final - Peru	(United States) Jordan Scott	$168,210

== Season 6 ==
Date	City	Event	Winner	Prize
March 13–17, 2013	(Chile) Viña del Mar	LAPT Viña del Mar - Chile	(Argentina) Pablo Tavitian	$184,220
April 25–30, 2013	(Brazil) São Paulo	LAPT Brazil - Brazil	(Brazil) Victor Sbrissa	$252,971
June 5–9, 2013	(Colombia) Medellín	LAPT Medellín - Colombia	(Colombia) Weider Gutierrez	$86,947
July 31-Aug. 4, 2013	(Peru) Lima	LAPT Peru - Peru	(Chile) Patrício Rojas	$123,840
September 18–22, 2013	Panama City	LAPT Panama - Panama	(Panama) Galal Dahrouj	$132,535
November 21–24, 2013	(Uruguay) Punta del Este	LAPT Uruguay Grand Final - Uruguay	(United States) Carter Gill	$218,692

== Season 7 ==
Date	City	Event	Winner	Prize
March 19–23, 2014	(Chile) Viña del Mar	LAPT Chile - Chile	(Argentina) Mario Javier López	$117,991
May 30-June 3, 2014	(Brazil) São Paulo	LAPT Brazil - Brazil	(Brazil) Caio Hey	$304,501
July 23–27, 2014	Panama City	LAPT Panama - Panama	(Argentina) Fabian Ortiz	$143,930
October 15–19, 2014	(Peru) Lima	LAPT Peru Grand Final - Peru	(Chile) Oscar Alache	$135,488

== Season 8 ==
Date	City	Event	Winner	Prize
January 7–9, 2015	(The Bahamas) Paradise Island	LAPT Bahamas at PCA 2015 - Bahamas	(United States) Josh Kay	$367,928
March 6–10, 2015	(Chile) Viña del Mar	LAPT Viña del Mar - Chile	(Chile) Oscar Alache	$131,962
May 8–12, 2015	Panama City	LAPT Panama - Panama	(Canada) Shakeeb Kazemipur	$180,112
July 10–14, 2015	(Peru) Lima	LAPT Peru - Peru	(Chile) Claudio Moya	$135,576
September 18–22, 2015	(Uruguay) Punta del Este	LAPT Uruguay - Uruguay	(Argentina) Mario Javier López	$117,991
November 24–30, 2015	(Brazil) São Paulo	LAPT Grand Final at BSOP Millions - Brazil	(Brazil) Yuri Martins Dzivielevski	$175,155

== Season 9 ==
Date	Event / city	Players	Prize pool	Winner	Prize	Results
January 7–9, 2016	(The Bahamas) LAPT Bahamas $2,200; Atlantis Resort & Casino, Paradise Island, Bahamas	851	$1,650,940	(Greece) Georgios Sotiropoulos	$308,220	
March 4–8, 2016	LAPT Chile $1,500; Casino Enjoy, Viña del Mar, Chile	565	$737,325	(Brazil) Rodrigo Strong	$120,565	
May 12–16, 2016	LAPT Panama $1,500; Sortis Hotel, Spa & Casino, Panama City, Panama	453	$721,665	(Colombia) Andres Carrillo	$138,225	
September 23–27, 2016	LAPT Uruguay $1,500; Enjoy Conrad Resort & Casino, Punta del Este, Uruguay	438	$571,590	(Argentina) Pedro Claus	$90,630	
November 29 - December 1, 2016	LAPT/BSOP Millions R$8,000 (~$2,350); Sheraton São Paulo WTC Hotel, São Paulo, Brazil	329	R$2,262,828 (~$663,658)	(Argentina) Jose Ignacio Barbero	R$341,182 (~$100,064)	

== Season 2023 ==
Date	Event / City	Players	Prize Pool	Winner	Prize	Results
March 2-6	LAPT Rio de Janeiro R$7,500 (~$1,445); Windsor Barra Hotel, Rio de Janeiro, Brazil	315	R$3,394,340 (~$654,204)	(Brazil) Anthony Barranqueiros	R$650,000 (~$125,277)	
April 28-May 2	LAPT Montevideo $1,500; Hotel Casino Carrasco, Montevideo, Uruguay	346	$417,900	(Venezuela) Tullio Bertoli	$80,000	
August 4-8	LAPT Panama $1,500; Crown Casino Panama, Panama City, Panama	346	$417,900	(Netherlands) Markus Meekma	$69,934	
October 4-10	BSOP/LAPT Foz do Iguaçu R$7,500 (~$1,454); Wish Resort Golf Convention, Foz do Iguaçu, Brazil	258	R$1,750,000 (~$339,345)	(Paraguay) Hugo Zanotti	R$330,000 (~$63,991)	
November 17-20	LAPT/BSOP Millions R$7,500 (~$1,543); Sheraton São Paulo WTC Hotel, São Paulo, Brazil	771	R$4,736,360 (~$974,419)	(Brazil) Lucas Rigos	R$792,000 (~$162,939)	

== Season 2024 ==
Date	Event / City	Players	Prize Pool	Winner	Prize	Results
April 19-23	LAPT Panama $1,500; Hotel El Panamá by Faranda Grand, Panama City, Panama	263	$315,260	(Costa Rica) Johnny Sandoval	$65,000	
August 14-21	LAPT Mexico $1,500; Royal Yak Hipódromo de las Américas, Mexico City, Mexico	632	MX$12.847.100 (~$676.284)	(Mexico) Oscar Omar Sosa Dorantes	MX$2.500.000 (~$131.602)	
October 9-16	LAPT Rio de Janeiro R$7,500 (~$1,325); Windsor Marapendi Hotel, Rio de Janeiro, Brazil	273	R$1,618,300 (~$293,703)	(Brazil) Brunno Botteon De Albuquerque	R$325,000 (~$58,984)	
November 15-29	LAPT GRAND FINAL BRAZIL at BSOP Millions R$7,500 (~$1,350); Guaranteed Prizepool R$ 1,500,000 (~U$270,000); Sheraton São Paulo WTC Hotel, São Paulo, Brazil	656	R$3,958,810 (~$682,589)	(Brazil) Bernardo Tristao Soares	R$673,000 (~$116,040)	

== Winners by country ==
Place	Country	Times
1st	Argentina	11
2nd	Brazil	10
3rd	Chile	6
4th	(United States) USA	5
5th	Peru	2
	Canada	2
	Colombia	2
	Germany	2
	Netherlands	2
10th	Austria	1
	Costa Rica	1
	Greece	1
	Hungary	1
	(Republic of Ireland) Ireland	1
	Mexico	1
	Norway	1
	Panama	1
	Paraguay	1
	Spain	1
	Uruguay	1
	Venezuela	1
	TOTAL	54

== Seats at final tables by country ==
Place	Country	Times
1st	Brazil	107
2nd	Argentina	74
3rd	Chile	41
4th	United States	36
5th	Colombia	33
6th	Mexico	21
7th	Canada	16
8th	Venezuela	15
	Panama	14
10th	Peru	13
	Uruguay	11
12th	Costa Rica	8
13th	Austria	6
14th	Germany	5
	Ecuador	4
	Netherlands	4
17th	Spain	3
	Russia	3
19th	Australia	2
	France	2
	Lebanon	2
	Norway	2
	Poland	2
24th	Bulgaria	1
	Czech Republic	1
	Denmark	1
	Greece	1
	Guatemala	1
	Honduras	1
	Hungary	1
	(Republic of Ireland) Ireland	1
	Italy	1
	Jamaica	1
	Malta	1
	New Zealand	1
	Paraguay	1
	Portugal	1
	Puerto Rico	1
	Ukraine	1
	United Kingdom	1
	Sweden	1
	Switzerland	1

== Top 10 prizes ==
Rank	Event	Place	Name	Prize
1st	(Argentina) LAPT2 Mar del Plata	1st	(Germany) Dominik Nitsche	$381,030
2nd	(Brazil) LAPT4 São Paulo	1st	(Chile) Alex Manzano	$368,703
3rd	(The Bahamas) LAPT8 Bahamas	1st	(United States) Joshua Kay	$367,928
4th	(Argentina) LAPT3 Rosário	1st	(Peru) Martin Sansour	$322,280
5th	(The Bahamas) LAPT9 Bahamas	1st	(Greece) Georgios Sotiropoulos	$308,220
6th	LAPT7 Brazil	1st	(Brazil) Caio Hey	$304,501
7th	(Costa Rica) LAPT2 San Jose	1st	(United States) Ryan Fee	$285,773
8th	(Uruguay) LAPT2 Punta del Este	1st	(Norway) Karl Hevroy	$283,580
9th	(Uruguay) LAPT3 Punta del Este	1st	(Argentina) José "Nacho" Barbero	$279,330
10th	(Costa Rica) LAPT1 San Jose	1st	(Hungary) Valdemar Kwaysser	$274,103
