= Poker tournament =

Series of competitive poker games

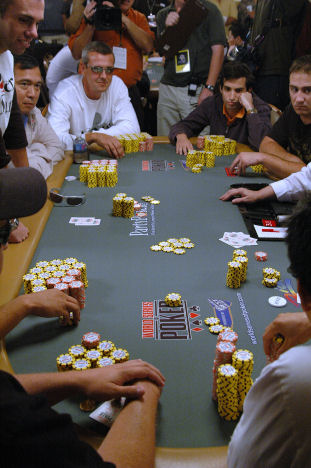
2006 World Series of Poker Main Event

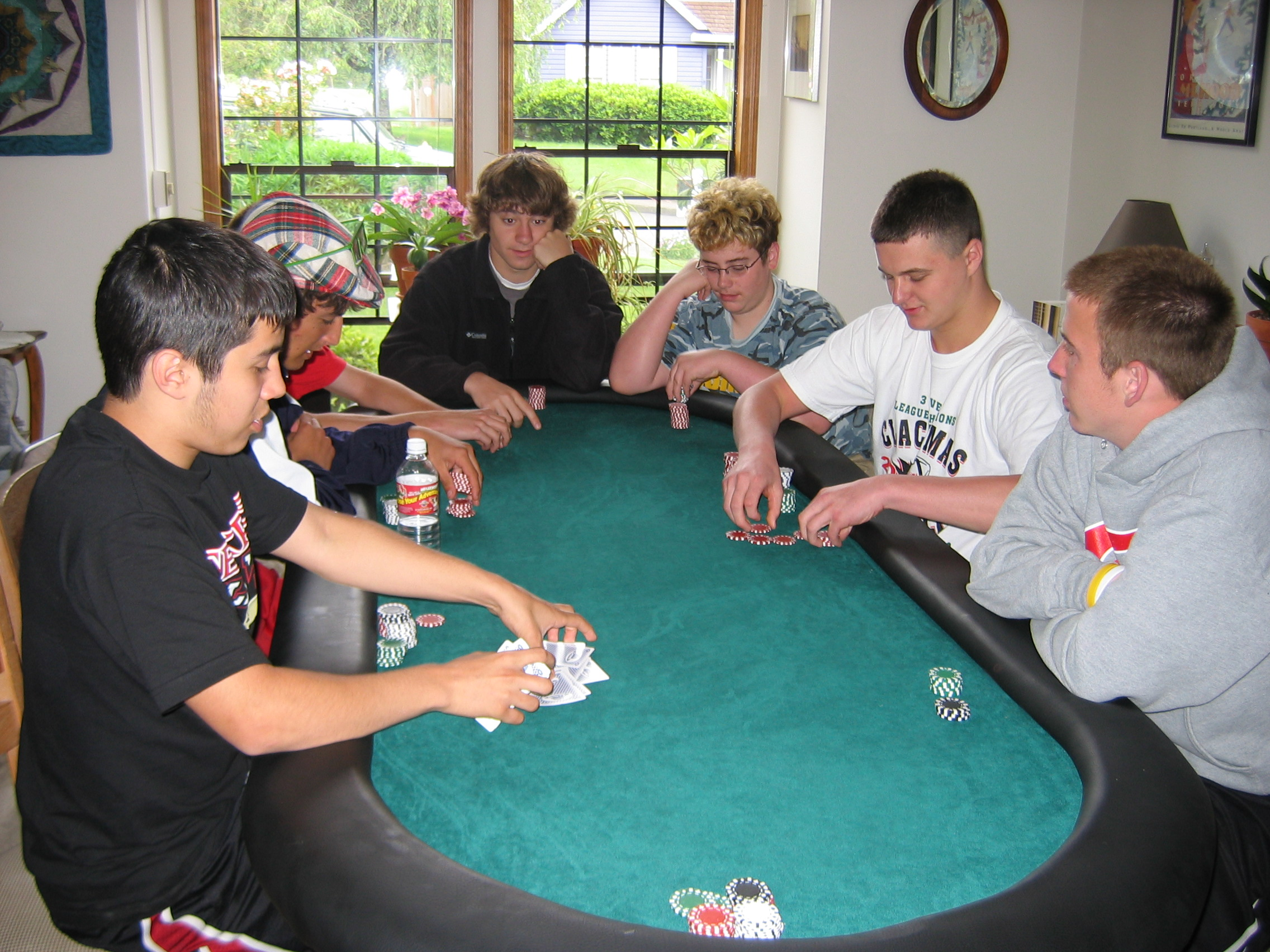
A home poker tournament in progress.

A poker tournament is a tournament where players compete by playing poker. It can feature as few as two players playing on a single table (called a "heads-up" tournament), and as many as tens of thousands of players playing on thousands of tables. The winner of the tournament is usually the person who wins every poker chip in the game and the others are awarded places based on the time of their elimination. To facilitate this, in most tournaments, blinds rise over the duration of the tournament. Unlike in a ring game (or cash game), a player's chips in a tournament cannot be cashed out for money and serve only to determine the player's placing.

== Buy-ins and prizes ==
To enter a typical tournament, a player pays a fixed buy-in and at the start of play is given a certain quantity of tournament poker chips. Commercial venues may also charge a separate fee, or withhold a small portion of the buy-in, as the cost of running the event. Tournament chips have only notional value; they have no cash value, and only the tournament chips, not cash, may be used during play. Typically, the amount of each entrant's starting tournament chips is an integer multiple of the buy-in. Some tournaments offer the option of a re-buy or buy-back; this gives players the option of purchasing more chips. In some cases, re-buys are conditional (for example, offered only to players low on or out of chips) but in others they are available to all players (called add-ons). Player with no chips remaining (and who have exhausted or declined all re-buy options, if any are available) are eliminated from the tournament.

In most tournaments, the number of players at each table is kept even by moving players, either by switching one player or (as the field shrinks) taking an entire table out of play and distributing its players amongst the remaining tables. A few tournaments, called shoot-outs, do not do this; instead, the last player (sometimes the last two or more players) at a table moves on to a second or third round, akin to a single-elimination tournament found in other games.

The prizes for winning are usually derived from the buy-ins, though outside funds may be entered as well. For example, some invitational tournaments do not have buy-ins and fund their prize pools with sponsorship revenue and/or gate receipts from spectators. Tournaments without a buy-in are referred to as freerolls. A freeroll tournament is free to enter and usually the player is given one chance in the tournament. A variation on a freeroll tournament is called a "freebuy". In a freebuy event, a player can enter with a free entry, but if the player loses their chips during the registration period they are able to buy themselves back into the event.

Play continues, in most tournaments, until all but one player is eliminated, though in some tournament situations, especially informal ones, players have the option of ending by consensus.

Players are ranked in reverse chronological order — the last person standing in the game earns 1st place, the second-to-last earns 2nd, and so on. This ranking of players by elimination is unique amongst games, and also precludes the possibility of a tie for first place, since one player alone must have all the chips to end the tournament. (Ties are possible for all other places, though they are rare since the sole tiebreaker is the number of chips one has at the start of the hand in which one is eliminated, and hence two people would need to start a hand with exactly the same number of chips and both be eliminated on that same hand in order to tie with each other.)

Sometimes tournaments end by mutual consensus of the remaining players. For example, in a ten-person, $5 game, there may be two players remaining with $29 and $21, respectively, worth of chips. Rather than risk losing their winnings, as one of them would if the game were continued, these two players may be allowed to split the prize proportional to their in-game currency (or however they agree).

Certain tournaments, known as bounty tournaments, place a bounty on some or all of the players. If a player knocks an opponent out, the player earns the opponent's bounty. Individual bounties or total bounties collected by the end of a tournament may be used to award prizes. Bounties usually work in combination with a regular prize pool, where a small portion of each player's buy-in goes towards his or her bounty.

Other tournaments allow players to exchange some or all of their chips in the middle of a tournament for prize money, giving the chips cash value. Separate portions of each player's buy-in go towards a prize pool and a "cash out" pool. The cash out rate is typically fixed, and a time when players may not cash out (such as the final table) is usually established. The remaining cash out pool is either paid out to the remaining field or added to the regular prize pool.

Prizes are awarded to the winning players in one of two ways:

- Fixed: Each placing corresponds to a certain payoff. For example, a ten-person, $20 buy-in tournament might award $100 to the first-place player, $60 for second-place, $40 for third, and nothing for lower places.
- Proportional: Payouts are determined according to a percentage-based scale. The percentages are determined based upon the number of participants and will increase payout positions as participation increases. As a rule, roughly one player in ten will 'cash', or make a high enough place to earn money. These scales are very top-heavy, with the top three players usually winning more than the rest of the paid players combined.

Tournaments can be open or invitational. The World Series of Poker, whose Main Event (a $10,000 buy-in no limit Texas hold 'em tournament) is considered the most prestigious of all poker tournaments, is open.

Multi-table tournaments involve many players playing simultaneously at dozens or even hundreds of tables. Satellite tournaments to high-profile, expensive poker tournaments are the means of entering a major event without posting a significant sum of cash. These have significantly smaller buy-ins, usually on the order of one-tenth to one-fiftieth the main tournament's buy-in, and can be held at various venues and, more recently, on the Internet. Top players in this event, in lieu of a cash prize, are awarded seats to the main tourney, with the number of places dependent on participation. Chris Moneymaker, who won the 2003 World Series of Poker Main Event, was able to afford his seat by winning an Internet tournament with a $39 buy-in. Greg Raymer, 2004 World Series of Poker champion, acquired his seat via a $165 Internet tournament.

The opposite of a multi-table tournament is a single-table tournament, often abbreviated STT. A number of places (typically, two, six or nine) are allocated at a single table, and as soon as the required number of players has appeared, chips are distributed and the game starts. This method of starting single-table tournaments has caused them to be referred to as sit-and-go (SNG) tournaments, because when the required number of players "sit", the tournament "goes." Sit-and-go tournaments of more than one table are becoming more common, however, especially in Internet poker. A single-table tournament effectively behaves the same as the final table of a multi-table tournament, except that the players all begin with the same number of chips, and the betting usually starts much lower. Almost invariably, fixed payoffs are used.

A tournament series may consist of either single-table or multi-table tournaments. In a tournament series, multiple tournaments are played in which prizes are awarded. However, a series leaderboard or standings system is often used and additional prizes, drawn from the individual tournament buy-ins, are awarded to those who perform best overall in the series. Major poker tournaments such as the World Poker Tour and World Series of Poker, use standings to determine a player of the year.

== Playing format ==
The most common playing format for poker tournaments is the "freezeout" format. All players still playing in a tournament constitute a dynamic pool. Whenever a player loses all his chips and gets eliminated, his table shrinks. To combat the constant shrinking of tables and avoid having tables play with varying numbers of players, players are moved between tables, with unnecessary tables getting closed as the tournament progresses. In the end, all remaining players are seated on just one table, known as the "final table". Most sit and go tournaments are freezeouts.

In some tournaments, known as "rebuy tournaments", players have the ability to re-buy into the game in case they lost all their chips and avoid elimination for a specific period of time (usually ranging from one to two hours). After this so-called "rebuy period", the play resumes as in a standard freezeout tournament and eliminated players do not have the option of returning to the game any more. Rebuy tournaments often allow players to rebuy even if they have not lost all their chips, in which case the rebuy amount is simply added to their stack. A player is not allowed to rebuy in-game if he has too many chips (usually the amount of the starting stack or half of it). At the end of the rebuy period remaining players are typically given the option to purchase an "add-on", an additional amount of chips, which is usually similar to the starting stack.

Another playing format is the "shootout" tournament. A shootout tournament divides play in rounds. In a standard shootout tournament, 2-10 players sit on each table and the table roster remains the same until everyone but one player is eliminated. The table winners progress to the final table where the tournament winner is determined. In a shootout tournament players are usually awarded places in tiers based on how many rounds they lasted and in which place they were eliminated. Shootouts can include multiple rounds (triple, quadruple or quintuple shootout) or feature several players from each table progressing (usually up to three). Shootouts are also a common format for large heads-up multi-table tournaments, although these may feature double or triple elimination instead of the standard single knockout method.

A recent innovation is the "mix-max" or "mixed max" tournament, in which the table sizes vary during the course of the event. A typical example is the mix-max event held at the 2012 World Series of Poker, in which the first day of play was nine-handed, the second day six-handed, and the rest of the tournament heads-up. This effectively made it a hybrid freezeout–shootout tournament, with freezeout play at larger tables and shootout play in the heads-up phase.

== Betting format ==
Betting in tournaments can take one of three forms:

- In a structured (fixed limit) betting system, bets and raises are restricted to specific amounts, though these amounts typically increase throughout the tournament. For example, for a seven-card stud tournament with the stakes at 10/20, raises would be $10 in the first three rounds of betting, and $20 in the latter rounds.
- Semi-structured betting provides ranges for allowed raises. Usually, in this format, one may not raise less than a previous player has raised. For example, if one player raises $20, it would be illegal for another player to raise an additional $5. Pot limit is a semi-structured format in which raises cannot exceed the current size of the pot. Spread limit is a semi-structured format in which bets (and subsequent raises) must be between a minimum and maximum amount.
- Unstructured betting, usually called no limit. While blinds, antes, or bring-ins are fixed, players are free to bet as much as they wish, even early in a round of betting. To bet all of one's chips (risking one's tournament life, in the event of losing the hand) is to go all-in. In no-limit tournaments, players will sometimes take this risk even early in the betting; for example, in some no-limit Texas Hold 'Em tournaments, it is not uncommon for players to bet "all-in" before the flop.

The betting structure is one of the most defining elements of the game; even if other aspects are equivalent, a fixed-limit version and its no-limit counterpart are considered to be very different games, because the strategies and play styles are very different. For instance, it is much easier to bluff in a no-limit game, which allows aggressive betting, than in a fixed-limit game. No-limit games also vary widely according to the proclivities of the players; an informal, emergent, betting structure is developed by the players' personal strategies and personalities.

The stakes of each round, as well as blinds, bring-ins, and antes as appropriate per game, typically escalate according either to the time elapsed or the number of hands played.

== Variants of poker ==
While some tournaments offer a mix of games, like H.O.R.S.E. events which combine hold'em, Omaha, Razz, stud, stud eight or better, and dealer's choice events, at which one may choose from a similar menu of games, most tournaments feature one form of stud or community card poker, such as seven-card stud, seven card high-low stud, Omaha hold 'em or Texas hold 'em. Both Omaha and Texas hold 'em tournaments are commonly offered in fixed-limit and pot limit, and no-limit Texas hold 'em tournaments are very common (no-limit Omaha is almost nonexistent in tournament play).

== Tournament venues ==
Informal tournaments can be organized by a group of friends. Casinos, cardrooms, and online gambling sites may offer tournaments. The venue will post tournament schedules on its website or in its poker room.

However, these are not the only venues. Poker cruises offer tournaments at sea. Hosts of larger poker tournaments will often hold the event in the convention center of a casino; for example, the 2022 World Series of Poker was in the convention centers of both Bally's Las Vegas and Paris Las Vegas.

== Major tournaments ==
The largest and most well-known tournament in the USA is the World Series of Poker, held in Las Vegas. The World Series was on ESPN from 1987 to 2020 before CBS Sports became the domestic television partner for 2021 and beyond. Since 2007, PokerGO has been partnered with the WSOP to provide live streams and on-demand content.

In the 1980s the Super Bowl of Poker was the second largest and most prestigious tournament.

The 2005 World Series of Poker was the first held outside of Binion's Horseshoe Casino, though the final few days of the main event were held in the legendary Benny's Bullpen. Later tournaments have been held at one of the Harrah's Entertainment and later Caesars Entertainment properties; the Rio served as the venue from 2005-2021.

The largest and most well-known tournament in Europe is the European Poker Tour, which was founded in 2004 by John Duthie and is now the largest poker tour in the world by both total players and prize pool. The World Series of Poker Europe began in 2007 in London, moved in 2011 to Cannes, and moved again in 2013 to the Paris region.

The largest and most well-known tournament in Asia is the Asia Pacific Poker Tour Macau event.

The largest and most well-known tournament in Latin America is the Latin American Poker Tour Argentina event.

The Crown Australian Poker Championship, also known as the Aussie Millions, is the largest tournament in the Pacific region. WSOP owner Caesars Entertainment and Aussie Millions host Crown Melbourne teamed up to launch the World Series of Poker Asia-Pacific, which held its first edition in 2013.

In addition to these events, there are other major tournaments throughout the year. The World Poker Tour is held at different venues worldwide and broadcasts a series of open tournaments throughout the U.S. and Caribbean with buy-ins from $5,000 to $25,000, as well as European events with a €10,000 buy-in. Some of these events are stand alone tournaments like the Caribbean Poker Adventure, but most are held in conjunction with a tournament series being held at the host casino, like the Commerce Casino's LA Poker Classic, the Grand Sierra's World Poker Challenge and the Bicycle Casino's Legends of Poker. A North American Poker Tour was launched in 2010.

Atlantic City hosts The United States Poker Championship at the Trump Taj Mahal casino, which has been broadcast by ESPN in recent years.

The main live poker tournament in Africa is the All Africa Poker Tournament hosted by the Piggs Peak Casino in Piggs Peak, Swaziland.

The National Heads-Up Poker Championship is 64 players compete in heads-up matches single elimination style to determine a winner. It is one of the most prestigious heads up poker tournaments and it is the first tournament produced by a television network.

The internet poker revolution has sparked online poker tournaments and series that have become larger than many live tournaments. The World Championship of Online Poker (WCOOP) and the Full Tilt Online Poker Series (FTOPS) are two of the biggest online poker tournament series, with tournament prizes surpassing the million-dollar mark.

In 2022, after 17 years at the Rio, the World Series of Poker moved to Bally's and Paris.

== See also ==
- Tournament director
- Sit and go
- List of largest poker tournaments in history (by prize pool)
