= Victor Chandler Poker Cup =

Poker tournament in England

The Victor Chandler Poker Cup (often abbreviated to The Victor Poker Cup or The VC Poker Cup) was a poker tournament held in 2004 and 2005 in England for broadcast on Sky Sports.

The £5,000 buy-in event commenced in 2004 and is played out in a no limit Texas hold 'em format.

== 2004 ==
The event was held from 23-24 July in London. 100 competitors took part, with the following making the final table.

The event is noted for featuring three of the four members of The Hendon Mob at the same final table, together with John Kabbaj, who is considered their unofficial fifth member.

Place	Name	Prize
1st	(England) Harry "Wise Owl" Demetriou	£250,000
2nd	(England) Ram "Crazy Horse" Vaswani	£125,000
3rd	(Republic of Ireland) Paul Leckey	£50,000
4th	(England) "Rocky" Ross Boatman	£30,000
5th	(England) Garry "The Whacker" Bush	£15,000
6th	(Northern Ireland) Sean Murphy	£10,000
7th	(England) Julian "The Kid" Gardner	£5,000
8th	(England) Joe "The Elegance" Beevers	£5,000
9th	(England) John "Large" Kabbaj	£5,000
10th	(England) Rowan McIntyre	£5,000

Other British players who played the event include Jac Arama, Bruce "Elvis Senior" Atkinson, "Barmy" Barny Boatman, Dave "El Blondie" Colclough, Victoria Coren, Zac Goldsmith, Vinnie Jones, John McCririck, Grub Smith, Willie "The Dice Man" Tann, Simon "Aces" Trumper, Dave "The Devilfish" Ulliott, Mickey "The Worm" Wernick and "Mad" Marty Wilson.

Foreign players included "Gentleman" Liam Flood, Noel Furlong, Tony G, Mel "Silver Fox" Judah, "The Flying Dutchman" Marcel Lüske, "The Don" Donnacha O'Dea, Padraig Parkinson, Barry Shulman and Charalambos "Bambos" Xanthos.

== 2005 ==
The event was held from 1-5 August in London. 96 competitors took part, with the final 12 competitors progressing to semi-finals.

=== Semi-final 1 ===
Place	Name	Prize
1st	(Norway) Rolf Inge Kavik	advances to final
2nd	(Iran) "Gentleman" Ben Roberts	advances to final
3rd	(South Vietnam) Xuyen "Bad Girl" Pham	advances to final
4th	(England) John "Large" Kabbaj	£11,000
5th	(New Zealand) Lee "Final Table" Nelson, M.D.	£9,000
6th	(England) Stuart Fox	£7,000

=== Semi-final 2 ===
Place	Name	Prize
1st	(England) Tony "The Lizard" Bloom	advances to final
2nd	(Norway) Jan Sjavik	advances to final
3rd	(England) Kevin O'Leary	advances to final
4th	(Norway) Thomas Gundersen	£11,000
5th	(England) Robert Cooper	£9,000
6th	(Australia) Richard Holmes	£7,000

=== Final ===
Place	Name	Prize
1st	(England) Tony "The Lizard" Bloom	£200,000
2nd	(Norway) Rolf Inge Kavik	£100,000
3rd	(Iran) "Gentleman" Ben Roberts	£50,000
4th	(Norway) Jan Sjavik	£35,000
5th	(England) Kevin O'Leary	£25,000
6th	(South Vietnam) Xuyen "Bad Girl" Pham	£16,000
