= Garry Bush =

English poker player

- Nickname: The Whacker

World Series of Poker
- Bracelet: None
- Money finishes: 3
- Highest WSOP Main Event finish: 219th, 2005

European Poker Tour
- Title: None
- Final table: 1
- Money finish: 1

Garry "The Whacker" Bush is an English professional poker player based in London.

== Poker career ==
Bush started off as a cash game player in North London, but turned to tournaments in the late 1990s. Since then he has had numerous high finishes in limit, no limit and pot limit hold'em, Omaha and seven card stud.

=== 2000 ===
In April 2000 he followed a 5th-place finish in the Great Britain Poker Championships £500 Pot Limit Hold'em event with a 3rd-place finish in the I£600 Irish Open No Limit Hold'em. In August 2000 he won the £100 Pot Limit 7-card stud tournament to take home the £13,455 grand prize, defeating a final table including Willie Tann and Simon "Aces" Trumper.

=== 2001 ===
Bush made four final tables at the Great Britain Hold'em Championships in Birmingham in March 2001, including a win in the £500 Pot Limit Hold'em event, defeating a field including "Gentleman" Liam Flood and Lucy "Golden Ovaries" Rokach.

In August 2001 he finished 2nd in the £500 No Limit Hold'em event at the Grosvenor UK Open, with the final table including Dave Welch, Peter "The Poet" Costa and Tony "The Lizard" Bloom. The next month he won the Limit Hold'em event at the Austrian Classics tournament in Vienna.

He finished the year with another three tournament wins: the Limit Hold'em event at the Moscow Open, the Pot Limit Omaha event at the Winter Tournament Olympia and the Limit 7-card Stud tournament in the Helsinki Freezeout.

=== 2002 ===
In April 2002 Bush made his one and only appearance on Late Night Poker, finishing 5th in the heat won by Surinder Sunar and also featuring "Mad" Marty Wilson, Dave Welch and Victoria Coren. His heat is often remembered for his raise with a pair of 6's, which made Coren lay down Ace-King and also made Welch lay down a pair of Jacks.

In June 2002 he took first prize in the Pot Limit Hold'em event at the Taleon Masters in St Petersburg.

Bush made another 18 final table appearances in the remainder of the year, including another three wins.

His success throughout the year led to him winning the European Poker Player of the Year award for 2002.

=== 2003 ===
Although Bush did not win any major tournaments in 2003, he made 13 final tables in 4 different countries. Arguably his greatest achievement in 2003 was a 3rd-place finish in the Pot Limit Omaha tournament in the Irish Winter Tournament in Dublin.

=== 2004 ===
In 2004 Bush achieved his greatest successes to date. His second-place finish in the $3,000 Pot Limit Hold'em tournament at the World Series of Poker (WSOP) earned him $139,540 at the end of a lengthy event that included Ram "Crazy Horse" Vaswani and Phil Hellmuth Jr. He followed this with a 5th-place finish in the Victor Poker Cup, earning a further £15,000 in July 2004.

Bush played in the inaugural European Poker Tour tournament in September 2004, making the final table in Barcelona. He rounded off the year winning the 7-card stud tournament at the Korona Russia Poker Championships.

=== 2005 ===
Bush won the No Limit Hold'em tournament at the Palms Summer Poker Series in June 2005 as a warm-up to the WSOP. At the WSOP itself he made it into the money of the Main Event for the first time, taking $33,197 for his 219th-place finish.

As of 2023, Bush has earned over $810,000 in live tournament play.
