= Jac Arama =

British-French poker player (born 1968)

- Nickname: JacAttack
- Born: 20 February 1968 (age 58)

World Series of Poker
- Bracelet: None
- Money finishes: 5
- Highest WSOP Main Event finish: 271st, 2007

Jac Arama (born Jacques Arama on 20 February 1968 in Richmond, London, UK) is a TV producer and talent agent of French descent, based in London UK. Previously he was a high profile professional poker player. Arama appeared on TV regularly, including Late Night Poker and the World Poker Championship (which he co produced). He has amassed over $700,000 in tournament winnings and was known for his aggressive playing style which is referred to by poker commentators as Jac Attack. He was also known for his large range of sunglasses (over 300 pairs).

== Poker career ==
His first major tournament victory was at the Master Classics of Poker 2000 event in Amsterdam, where he earned the $63,471 first prize. This led to several appearances on the Late Night Poker television show. In his first appearance he finished fourth, outlasting both Dave Welch and Joe Beevers. On his second attempt he finished third, outlasting John Duthie, but unable to overcome Ram Vaswani.

He eventually won a Late Night Poker tournament on his third attempt, defeating Gary Jones in the heads-up confrontation. He went on to finish fourth at the season 5 Grand Final, behind Padraig Parkinson, Korosh Nejad and Beevers. The following year he finished second in his heat to Lucy Rokach.

Arama had two money finishes at the 2002 World Series of Poker (WSOP), including a final table appearance in the $1,500 Triple Draw Lowball Ace to Five event, where he finished just behind John Juanda and Paul Phillips.

In 2003 he beat a final table including Surinder Sunar to earn a £74,200 first prize in the £1,000 British Open event.

Arama finished in 271st place at the 2007 World Series of Poker Main Event, cashing for $45,422.

As of 2023, his live tournament earnings exceed $730,000.
