= Korosh Nejad =

Iranian poker player

Korosh Nejad (born Korosh Arshadnejad) is an Iranian professional poker player based in London, England. He was born in Tehran.

Nejad has played for over 30 years. He first came to the public attention with three impressive performances in the Stakis Festival in London during May 1999 where he had a 2nd-place finish in a £100 Pot Limit Omaha tournament, a 1st-place finish in a £100 Seven Card Stud tournament and a 4th-place finish in a £250 No Limit Hold'em tournament.

He went on to make regular appearances on the Late Night Poker television show. In the third season he won a tournament featuring Charalambos "Bambos" Xanthos, "Gentleman" Liam Flood, Ram "Crazy Horse" Vaswani and Hemish Shah. He won a tournament in the fifth season, which featured Joe "The Elegance" Beevers, Dave "The Devilfish" Ulliott and Julian "The Kid" Gardner. He went on to finish 2nd to Padraig Parkinson in the Series 5 Grand Final.

Korosh finished as runner-up to Neil "Bad Beat" Channing in his heat of the 2005 World Speed Poker Open but was disqualified for not paying the 2500GBP entry fee and given a life ban from future tournaments.
