= Ken Lennaárd =

Swedish poker player and actor (born 1971)

- Nickname: Thimble
- Born: 29 May 1971 (age 55)

World Series of Poker
- Bracelet: None
- Money finishes: 6
- Highest WSOP Main Event finish: 34th, 2003

Ken Richard Douglas Lennaárd (born 29 May 1971) is a Swedish professional poker player and former actor, based in Stockholm, Sweden. He was also the chairman of the Swedish Poker Federation until he resigned in October 2006.

== Poker career ==
Lennaárd first finished in the money of a World Series of Poker (WSOP) event in 1998 when he finished 6th in the $1,500 pot limit Omaha event won by Donnacha O'Dea.

His continued exposure to the European poker tournament circuit led to his appearance in season 5 of Late Night Poker. He finished 2nd to Padraig Parkinson in his opening heat, qualifying him for the semi-final won by Joe Beevers. In Late Night Poker's sixth season, he defeated Victoria Coren in the heads-up confrontation to win his heat, qualifying for the grand final won by Peter Costa.

At the 2003 WSOP, Lennaárd cashed in the $10,000 no limit hold'em Main Event, finishing in 34th place for $35,000.

Lennaárd defeated Ben Roberts to win his heat of the William Hill Poker Grand Prix, qualifying him for the grand final where he finished in 5th place.

Lennaárd was also the team captain for Sweden in both the Poker Nations Cup and the PartyPoker.com Football & Poker Legends Cup.

As of 2008, his total live tournament winnings exceed $830,000.

== Other work ==
Lennaárd is a former child actor, and had a role in the movies Hela långa dagen (1979) and Blomstrande tider (1980).

Lennaárd earned his "Thimble" nickname after finishing runner-up in a Swedish Monopoly competition, an achievement described by "Barmy" Barny Boatman as being equivalent to being the "second best-looking bloke in ABBA."

Lennaárd was also the winner of the Swedish reality television game show Riket in 2004.
