= Dave Ulliott =

English poker player (1954–2015)

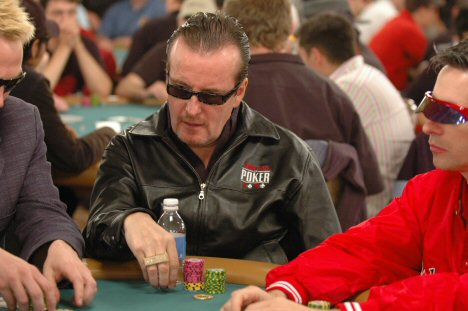
- Ulliott on the 2005 World Series of Poker
- Nicknames: The Devilfish, The Clock
- Born: 1 April 1954; Kingston upon Hull, England
- Died: 6 April 2015 (aged 61)

World Series of Poker
- Bracelet: 1
- Final tables: 11
- Money finishes: 33
- Highest WSOP Main Event finish: 72nd, 2004

World Poker Tour
- Title: 1
- Final tables: 2
- Money finishes: 8

European Poker Tour
- Money finish: 1

David Alan "Devilfish" Ulliott (1 April 1954 – 6 April 2015) was an English professional gambler and poker player, known for his connections to Hull's organised crime scene. In 2017, he was posthumously inducted into the Poker Hall of Fame.

== Early years ==
Ulliott was born on April Fool's Day of 1954 in Kingston upon Hull, England. He left school at 15 years old and was introduced to gambling at an early age, frequently visiting bookmakers with his father and placing bets on horse racing with his colleagues. His early exposure to gambling marked the beginning of a lifelong involvement in the world of betting and poker.

== Criminal activities ==
Ulliott became part of a safe-cracking team after being told that all parties involved, including shop owners and local authorities, were complicit in the operation. Their targets included tobacconists, off-licenses, and garages. On one occasion, after losing over £5,000 ($6,500 USD) at a bookmaker's, Ulliott stole a safe and transported it home in a pram. However, one of the team members was apprehended and informed the police of Ulliott's involvement. He evaded capture for one week before being arrested.

Following his arrest, Ulliott was held in a cell at Kingston upon Hull Police Station for three weeks before being transferred to Leeds Prison. There he spent 23 hours a day in isolation during the first two months of his nine-month sentence.

Shortly after his release, Ulliott was again arrested in connection with an armed robbery at an off-license, though he was released three days later without charge. Afterward, he found employment at a timber yard but resumed his involvement with the safe-cracking team while also working as a bouncer and gambling.

At the age of 28, Ulliott was arrested after a fight outside a nightclub and was sentenced to 18 months in prison, serving time in both Leeds and Durham facilities. Most of his sentence was spent in solitary confinement for 23 hours a day. During this time, he befriended a fellow inmate named John, with whom he planned a bank robbery after their release. However, on the day of the planned heist, John was arrested by the regional crime squad, and Ulliott was advised by John's wife to abandon the criminal path and "go straight."

== Poker career ==
Ulliott was introduced to gambling by his parents, who played poker with him during his childhood. At 16, he learned how to play three-card brag after frequenting Hull's Fifty-One Club casino. By the time of his second marriage, Ulliott had begun organising poker games in the back of his pawn shop.

In late 1990, he met Gary Whitaker, a café manager from Wakefield, at Napoleon's Casino in Leeds. The two became close, travelling together to poker games six nights a week. Whitaker often placed bets for Ulliott after he was banned from all William Hill betting shops. Additionally, Whitaker became Ulliott's driver and held a 10% stake in his poker action.

When Ulliott first travelled to London, he found the competition much tougher, forcing him to adjust his playing style. He credited this experience with greatly improving his poker skills. In private poker games, Ulliott sometimes brought a gun to ensure he could leave with his winnings, even firing it into the air on one occasion to scare off opponents who planned to rob him.

=== Poker Success and the Origin of "Devilfish" ===
Ulliott first gained recognition in poker tournaments in 1993, gradually honing his skills in tournament play. His breakthrough came in 1996 when he won £100,000 over a two-week period at The Vic in London, which encouraged him and his friend, Gary Whitaker, to travel to Las Vegas, Nevada, for the first time.

Taking £10,000 with him, Ulliott maintained an even bankroll until he entered the $500 Pot Limit Omaha event at the 1997 Four Queens Poker Classic. During the heads-up match against Men Nguyen, a large group of Vietnamese-American supporters cheered for Nguyen, calling him "The Master." In response, Whitaker coined the nickname "Devilfish" for Ulliott, cheering, "Go on the Devilfish".

The nickname had been suggested earlier that year by Stephen Au-Yeung, who hosted a poker game Ulliott attended in Birmingham. Au-Yeung also sold Ulliott the domain name DevilFishPoker.com in 2005.

In the tournament, Ulliott reduced Nguyen's stack to a single chip. Despite Nguyen's protests, the tournament director insisted on taking the scheduled one-hour break. Ulliott famously told Nguyen, "We're taking the break, and in all fairness to you, I think you should go upstairs and think about your tactics." Ulliott eventually won the event, and the following day's headline read, Devilfish Devours the Master. Despite the fame the nickname brought, Ulliott later downplayed the tournament's significance, claiming it only mattered because of his new moniker. Before that nickname, Ulliott was known as "Dave the Clock" because he once used a grandfather clock as a buy-in for a local poker game where a furniture dealer was presented.

=== 1997 World Series of Poker (WSOP) ===
Ulliott arrived at the 1997 World Series of Poker (WSOP) with $200,000, but lost it all in cash games and tournament buy-ins. He borrowed over $70,000 more, but lost that as well, damaging several relationships along the way. However, he managed to gather enough money to enter the $2,000 Pot Limit Texas Hold'em event, where he eventually faced fellow Englishman Chris Truby in heads-up play.

In the final hand, Ulliott moved all-in with an open-ended straight draw and a flush draw, while Truby held the top set. Ulliott completed his straight on the river, securing the victory and earning $180,310, along with his first and only WSOP bracelet. Whitaker, his close friend, and driver, leapt over the barricade to join in the celebrations. While press reports suggested Ulliott got lucky, in reality, he was a 54.5% favourite to win the hand when the money went into the pot. After the victory, Ulliott had his bracelet engraved with his newly famous nickname, Devilfish.

Following his tournament win, Ulliott enjoyed a successful streak in cash games, netting between $10,000 and $20,000 daily for a two-week period. During this stretch, and upon the advice of his friend Mansour Matloubi, he played a high-stakes heads-up Pot Limit Omaha match against Lyle Berman, winning $168,000. By the end of his trip, Ulliott had amassed $742,000 in winnings, which he carried in duty-free bags along with Whitaker. Upon their return to their casino in Leeds, they were met with applause from their regular poker opponents.

=== Late Night Poker ===
In 1999, Ulliott was one of 40 players to appear in the first series of the Late Night Poker television series, the first poker show to use hole cam technology. He won his qualifying heat against a field that included Charalambos "Bambos" Xanthos and future Hendon Mobster Ross Boatman to advance to the Grand Final. Ulliott lead the final from the first hand (where his flush beat Surinder Sunar's pocket queens). During the event, he made four of a kind against Joe Beevers, eliminated Liam Flood and slow-played three aces against Dave Welch.This prompted commentator Nic Szeremeta to say, "I've never seen a hand played so well." Ulliott went on to win the heads-up confrontation against Peter Evans, and the £40,000 first prize.

Ulliott's victory was watched by over 1,500,000 people and his character at the table was part of the reason for the renewal of the series, which went on to run for five more series, with Ulliott appearing in them all. Ulliott also made the final table in the second series.

=== World Poker Tour ===
In January 2003, Ulliott won his biggest tournament cash prize in the World Poker Tour (WPT) first season Jack Binion World Poker Open. Ulliott outlasted a field of 160 players, entering the final table with a 2:1 chip lead over his nearest rival, and taking first place and $589,175 after eliminating Phil Ivey. Ulliott eliminated four of his five opponents at the final table, in a performance that commentator Mike Sexton has referred to as "still the most dominating performance in WPT history." In the second season, Ulliott was also invited to the WPT Bad Boys of Poker Invitational, and finished on the television bubble of the Aruba Poker Classic.

In December 2007, Ulliott came in 3rd place in the sixth season of the WPT Doyle Brunson Classic Championship Event earning $674,500.

=== Other events ===
Ulliott came close to winning a second WSOP bracelet on numerous occasions, finishing second in events at the 1998 WSOP and 2000 WSOP, and second at two more events at the 2001 WSOP. In two of these events, he was eliminated while holding aces.

Ulliott represented his country in the Poker Nations Cup, the PartyPoker.com Football & Poker Legends Cup and the Intercontinental Poker Championship as well as the inaugural British Poker Open, which had a strong American field in contention.

At the PartyPoker Premier League, he embarked on a rivalry with Phil Hellmuth, including one six-man game where Ulliott called Hellmuth's all-in bluff with A♠-8♠ against Hellmuth's 7♥-5♥, making him a better than 60% favourite. Hellmuth flopped the nut straight. Later in the same game, Hellmuth's pocket nines beat Ulliott's aces.

Ulliott's total lifetime tournament winnings exceeded $6,200,000. His 33 cashes at the WSOP account for $1,708,075 of those winnings.

== Personal life ==
Ulliott was married three times. He had two children with his first wife Susan; four children with Amanda (Mandy) Ashby; one child with his girlfriend Diana and one child with his third wife. He lived in Kingston upon Hull, close to his childhood home.

=== Autobiography ===
In spring 2010, Penguin Books announced the publication of Ulliott's autobiography, Devilfish: The Life & Times of a Poker Legend, in September 2010. It was launched at Poker in the Park – Europe's largest free poker festival, held in London's Leicester Square – with a book signing session and talk by Ulliott.

The book was favourably reviewed by journalist and poker player Victoria Coren in The Observer, who said, "I was nervous to review it, in case it was bad. Dave Ulliott is a friend of mine. And he has a gun. But I needn't have worried. The book is, like the man, fast, funny, scary, smart, cocky, colourful, and I adore them both." She recounted her first meeting with Ulliott:

In the winter of 1999, on the sixth floor of a Cardiff hotel, I walked into a lift to find it already occupied by an elderly couple and a tall, sinister-looking fellow in a black leather trench coat and red sunglasses. "The Devilfish!" I breathed. "Can I hold your bracelet?" Without a word, the shady gentleman slipped a heavy gold bracelet off his wrist and jingled it into my hand. The elderly couple must have thought we were both insane.

== Death ==
Ulliott was diagnosed with colon cancer in February 2015, and died of the disease on 6 April 2015 at the age of 61.

== Legacy and reputation ==
Despite the dominance of Texas Hold'em throughout televised poker, Ulliott had a reputation as a strong pot limit Omaha player, with over 40 finishes in the money in tournaments of that type. Once, in an Omaha cash game at The Vic in 1997, he successfully read that Jon Shoreman had a straight flush and laid down a four of a kind. Ulliott was also considered the best five-card stud player in Northern England. However, Ulliott indicated that his real preference was for four card Omaha.

In the UK, Ulliott was particularly famous, even being mentioned in EastEnders. He also appeared on the front cover of the inaugural edition of PokerPlayer magazine, and was voted No. 9 on their Top 10 Poker Legends List.

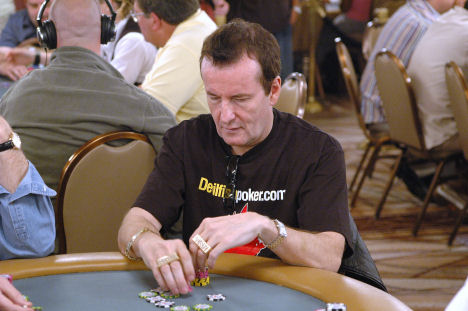
Ulliott wears a T-shirt advertising his website at the 2006 World Series of Poker.

Ulliott was associated with the online poker site Devilfish Poker. After being eliminated in third place for $120,000 in the Full Tilt Poker invitational event at the 2005 Monte Carlo Millions, Ulliott stood up, flashing a "www.devilfishpoker.com" sign that was strapped to his back inside his jacket. The event was being broadcast live on Fox Sports Net (FSN), which has a policy against advertising .com websites, and Ulliott was banned from appearing in any forthcoming FSN productions.

Ulliott later responded that he only paid the entry money so he could advertise his site; it was originally agreed that he would be able to promote the site, so he decided to advertise his site through the publicity stunt regardless. Despite supporting online poker sites, Ulliott indicated that many online players do not know what they are doing when playing, which makes them harder to play against.

Ulliott became the subject of some controversy when he claimed that female poker players would never be as good as male players. He cited Lucy Rokach as a rare example of a strong female player, but still maintained that female players would never be aggressive enough to compete with their male counterparts.

Ulliott claimed that his gambling wins led to him being banned by all the British bookmakers. He also claimed that Joe Beevers placed bets on his behalf for a period of time, during which time he managed to back all six winners at Ascot one year, including one at 14/1 and one at 20/1.

In his later years, Ulliott attempted to change his image, no longer wearing slicked-back hair or sunglasses at the poker table. This was a result of attending a party in Las Vegas, where he felt everyone looked the same as him.
