= Heads Up with Richard Herring =

- Created by: Ray Addison
- Starring: Richard Herring
- Country of origin: United Kingdom
- No. of episodes: 10

Production
- Running time: 60 minutes

Original release
- Network: pokerzone
- Release: 6 November 2005 – 8 January 2006

Heads Up with Richard Herring or HUWRH, is a British celebrity chat show written by and starring Richard Herring, who is best known as one half of comedy duo Lee and Herring, the stars of BBC Two shows Fist of Fun and This Morning With Richard Not Judy. HUWRH featured professional poker players and celebrities talking about their lives, their careers and their love of poker. The title is a reference to poker terminology, meaning a game where only two players remain at the end of the game. Richard would interview each guest individually during the show.

The show was hosted in an evening chat show format in front of a studio audience. It was the first UK produced Poker chatshow. The regular structure features an opening monologue by Richard followed by interviews with three guests from the world of poker and entertainment.

This programme first aired in 2005 on the Sky Digital channel Pokerzone in the United Kingdom.

== Episode Guests ==
- Episode 1: Chris Brooks (radio presenter)|, Malcolm "The Rock" Harwood, Ewen MacIntosh
- Episode 2: Andrew Black, James Hewitt, John Thomson
- Episode 3: Roberto Conte, Tiffany Williamson, Norman Pace
- Episode 4: Edward Giddins, Terry Frisby, John Duthie
- Episode 5: Andy Collins, Phil "The Power" Taylor, "Mad" Marty Wilson
- Episode 6: Grub Smith, Anthony Holden, Major Charles Ingram & Diana Ingram
- Episode 7: "Nasty" Nick Bateman, Greg "Fossilman" Raymer, John McCririck
- Episode 8: Fiona Foster, Dave "El Blondie" Colclough, Oliver Chris
- Episode 9: Addy Van Der Borgh, Brandon Block, "Barmy" Barny Boatman
- Episode 10: Jonathan Maitland, Roy "The Boy" Brindley, Michael Greco

== Credits ==
- Richard Herring – Written & Presented by
- Derek Brandon – Director
- Ray Addison – Series Producer
- Yvonne Davies – Series Editor
