= Marty Wilson (poker player) =

English poker player (1957–2019)

- Nickname: Mad
- Born: 1957
- Died: 26 July 2019 (aged 62)

World Series of Poker
- Bracelet: None
- Money finishes: 3
- Highest WSOP Main Event finish: None

Marty Wilson (1957 – 26 July 2019) was an English professional poker player from Wolverhampton. His nickname originates from when, as a teenager, he escaped several rival football fans by jumping into a polar bear pit.

His extensive career dates back to an early World Series of Poker visit in 1985. However he first gained public notoriety by finishing runner-up in the £300 Pot Limit Hold-Em event at the Victoria Casino in London in 1997.

He went on to become a regular on the Late Night Poker television series, being one of few players to appear in every series. His only win on the series was in his heat during series 3, where he defeated a field including Surinder Sunar and Pascal "Triple P" Perrault to get his seat in the Grand Final. He went on to finish 4th in the Final, which was eventually won by Phil Hellmuth Jr.

Wilson's biggest win at the time came in 1998, when he won the Carnivale of Poker tournament at the Rio in 1998.

In 2001, during the £300 Pot Limit Hold-Em tournament in Glasgow, Scotland he split the pot to take a £7,500 share of the first prize. The next year he won the $150 Pot Limit Hold-Em tournament in Dundee, Scotland, which included a rare final table appearance by Late Night Poker commentator Nic Szeremeta.

In 2004 he won the No Limit Hold-Em tournament at the Crown Australasian Poker Championship in Melbourne, defeating a final table including Peter "The Poet" Costa, "Barmy" Barny Boatman and "Cowboy" Kenna James. On the trip he found an address book left in his hotel room. He eventually realised it belonged to his brother Michael, who he had not seen in 18 years. He returned to the Crown Championship in 2005, taking the Pot Limit Omaha title as well.

In addition to playing tournaments, Marty was also a consultant for Matchroom Sports, the Floor Manager for the PartyPoker Den and an online player for NoblePoker.

He also taught several celebrities how to play poker, including Matthew Stevens, Barry Hearn, Phil "The Power" Taylor, Tom Cruise, Michael Greco and Helen Chamberlain (who went on to place second in the 2005 Poker Million tournament.

Marty appeared on television many times including Late Night Poker and Heads Up with Richard Herring.

His total live tournament winnings exceeded $400,000.
