= Irish Winter Festival of Poker =

Annual poker festival in Dublin

The Paddy Power Poker Irish Winter Festival of Poker is an annual poker festival that takes place in Dublin, Ireland. First organised in 2001, the festival is headlined by the Irish Masters main event, a Texas hold'em tournament, and typically takes place over the three days of the October bank holiday weekend.

It was run as a stand-alone festival in Dublin’s famous Merrion Club from 2001 to 2003 and as the Dublin leg of the European Poker Tour (EPT) from 2004 to 2007. Some of the most famous poker players in the world have recorded impressive results at the Irish Winter Festival in previous years, particularly in the Irish Masters main event.

Won by Irishman David Cleary in the inaugural year of 2001, the title of Irish Masters’ champion was then passed to Lucy Rokach, one of the world’s top females players, who recorded back-to-back victories in 2002 and 2003. This was made more impressive considering she also won one of the side events outright in 2001.

In 2004 the Irish Winter Festival became the Dublin leg of the European Poker Tour (EPT) and began to attract significant numbers of players from beyond the Ireland and Britain catchment area, including the top European and American tournament specialists. Ram Vaswani, a member of the successful Hendon Mob, captured that year’s Irish Masters and his only EPT title to date, finishing ahead of a final table that included Irish great Rory Liffey, ‘Bad Girl’ Pham and Julian Thew.

The following year the Irish Masters was won by Swede Mats Gavatin after a heads-up battle with compatriot Henrik Olander; the two Swedes had outlasted a field of 248, each of whom had paid €4,200 to compete. In 2006, Roland De Wolfe emerged victorious after battling through a field of 389 and triumphing over an experienced final table that included David Tavernier, William Thorson, George McKeever and Willie Tann.

In 2007 the Irish Masters main event was dominated by one of the most-talked about young players ever, Annette Obrestad, who held a massive chip lead on the final table, only to be beaten heads-up by the then-unknown American, Rueben Peters.

Obrestad busted local favourite Andy Black in 10th spot on the way to her 2nd place, much to the dismay of the Dublin crowd. A higher buy-in of €8,000 (similar to many EPT buy-ins that year) discouraged many of the local players who usually would have played in the event, and the organisers were somewhat disappointed with a field of only 221, top heavy with sponsored professionals.

== Irish Winter Festival of Poker 2008 ==
The 2008 paddypowerpoker.com Irish Winter Festival took place at Citywest Hotel, Dublin from October 25–27, 2008. Fiachra Meere, a 33-year-old amateur player from County Clare, won the Irish Masters €1,500 + €150 main event and €150,000 prize. Chris Wood placed 2nd for €106,000 and John Raftery was 3rd for €68,500. 423 players in total took part in the Irish Masters and there was a total prize pool of €634,500.

Jan Bendik of Slovakia won the €200 + €20 buy-in No Limit Holdem rebuy tournament on Sunday October 26 for €31,000, while Nicholas Leszkowicz won the €500 + €50 buy-in No Limit Hold’em freezeout tournament on Monday October 27 for €31,700.

== Irish Winter Festival of Poker 2009 ==
The 2009 paddypowerpoker.com Irish Winter Festival took place from October 23–26, 2009. The Irish Masters main event (€1,500 + €150 buy-in) had 398 entrants and was won by 24-year-old student Michael O'Sullivan, who hailed from the nearby suburb of Blanchardstown, Dublin. Michael Murphy finished in 2nd place, winning €88,500, while 3rd placed finisher Gary Mealy won €55,300. The total prizepool for the Irish Masters main event was €597,000. The highest placed paddypowerpoker.com online qualifier was Paul Dooley, who finished 7th for €22,400 and also won a special IWF Sole Survivor promotional sponsorship package worth €20,000.

Festival side events included a Super Satellite tournament, a two-day €500 No Limit Holdem event won by Antony Lorieu and a €300 Round-Of-Each tournament (which consisted of both No Limit Holdem and Pot Limit Omaha rounds) won by Darius Tamulevicus.

== Irish Winter Festival of Poker 2010 ==
The 2010 paddypowerpoker.com Irish Winter Festival of Poker took place from October 22–25, 2010 in the Burlington Hotel in Dublin, Ireland. As in previous years, the festival main event was the €1500 + €150 Irish Masters.

== Irish Masters - past winners ==
- 2012 John Keown
- 2011 Nick Newport
- 2009 Michael O'Sullivan
- 2008 Fiachra Meere
- 2007 Reuben Peters
- 2006 Roland De Wolfe
- 2005 Mats Gavatin
- 2004 Ram Vaswani
- 2003 Lucy Rokach
- 2002 Lucy Rokach
- 2001 David Cleary
