= Poker Nations Cup =

Poker tournament

The Poker Nations Cup is an international poker tournament, televised on Channel 4 from March 2006 onwards.

The series is commentated by Jesse May and Barny Boatman. Padraig Parkinson covered for Boatman in preliminary match 2.

The series was filmed in Cardiff, Wales. Thomas Kremser was the tournament director, and the dealers were Marina Kremser and Stevie Pollak.

The event in 2006 was sponsored by 888.com. In 2007 888.com has been replaced by Partypoker as main sponsors. The event will also be televised on Channel 4.

== Format ==
Six nations compete in the series, with six members to each team. Each team has a captain and an internet qualifier.

The captain chooses one player from the six available to compete in each of the six preliminary tournaments (each player on the team plays once, and once only.)

Points are awarded for the finishing position of each player in each preliminary event. These points are totalled and used to calculate chips in the Grand Final. Points are awarded as follows:

- 1st: 10 points
- 2nd: 7 points
- 3rd: 5 points
- 4th: 3 points
- 5th: 2 points
- 6th: 1 point

Team captains can choose to substitute team members during the Grand Final, where the winning team receives $100,000.

(NB: As members of a nation's team never face other members of the same team, there is no possibility of collusion, as is possible in other team-format poker tournaments.)

== Teams ==
NB: The flags within this article show the country the player is representing. e.g.: below Scott Gray is identified with the Irish flag as that is the country he is representing, despite Gray being born in Canada.

Great Britain	Denmark	Germany
Dave Ulliott ^{1}	Martin Wendt ^{1}	Michael Keiner ^{1}
Joe Beevers	Christian Grundtvig	Christoph Haller
Tony Bloom	Theo Jørgensen	Andreas Krause
Julian Gardner	Rehne Pedersen	Roland Specht
Ram Vaswani	Jan Vang Sørensen	Katja Thater
Scott Griffiths ^{2}	Anders Jensen ^{2}	Sebastian Zentgraf ^{2}

Ireland	Sweden	USA
Noel Furlong ^{1}	Ken Lennaárd ^{1}	Robert Williamson III ^{1}
Don Fagan	Ayhan Alsancak	Andy Bloch
Scott Gray	Fuat Can	Clonie Gowen
Rory Liffey	Erik Sagström	Thomas Keller
Padraig Parkinson	Bengt Sonnert	Kathy Liebert
Mahala Maria Roche ^{2}	Jens Lekström ^{2}	Gregory Jennison ^{2}

^{1}: denotes Team Captain
^{2}: denotes online qualifier

== Results ==
=== Preliminary rounds ===
Event	Winner	Runner-up	Remainder finishing order
Preliminary match 1	(Denmark) Theo Jørgensen	(Republic of Ireland) Padraig Parkinson	(United States) Andy Bloch; (United Kingdom) Scott Griffiths; (Sweden) Erik Sagström; (Germany) Christoph Haller
Preliminary match 2	(Sweden) Jens Lekström	(United States) Gregory Jennison	(Republic of Ireland) Scott Gray; (Denmark) Anders Jensen; (Germany) Sebastian Zentgraf; (United Kingdom) Dave Ulliott
Preliminary match 3	(Republic of Ireland) Mahala Maria Roche	(Germany) Katja Thater	(Denmark) Christian Grundtvig; (United States) Thomas Keller; (United Kingdom) Tony Bloom; (Sweden) Fuat Can
Preliminary match 4	(Germany) Roland Specht	(Denmark) Rehne Pedersen	(United States) Robert Williamson III; (Sweden) Ken Lennaárd; (United Kingdom) Julian Gardner; (Republic of Ireland) Rory Liffey
Preliminary match 5	(United Kingdom) Joe Beevers	(Republic of Ireland) Don Fagan	(United States) Clonie Gowen; (Germany) Andreas Krause; (Sweden) Bengt Sonnert; (Denmark) Martin Wendt
Preliminary match 6	(United Kingdom) Ram Vaswani	(United States) Kathy Liebert	(Denmark) Jan Vang Sørensen; (Sweden) Ayhan Alsancak; (Republic of Ireland) Noel Furlong; (Germany) Michael Keiner

=== Grand Final ===
Team captains chose three players to compete in the Grand Final. Only one player started, who then had to be substituted by the end of the third level. The second player had to be substituted for the third player at the end of the sixth level. Blind levels ran twice as long as in the preliminary heats.

Team captains were also entitled to call a 60-second time-out with any player in their team once per game.

The Grand Final's television broadcast spanned over two episodes.

Starting Lineup First	Players after 1st substitutions	Players after 2nd substitutions
(Denmark) Rehne Pedersen ^{(3rd sub)}	(Denmark) Christian Grundtvig ^{(took time-out), (7th sub)}	(Denmark) Theo Jørgensen ^{(2nd elimination, by Liebert)}
(United Kingdom) Joe Beevers ^{(1st sub)}	(United Kingdom) Ram Vaswani ^{(took time-out), (11th sub)}	(United Kingdom) Dave Ulliott ^{(winner)}
(Germany) Katja Thater ^{(2nd sub)}	(Germany) Roland Specht ^{(took time-out), (10th sub)}	(Germany) Michael Keiner ^{(5th elimination, by Ulliott)}
(Republic of Ireland) Scott Gray ^{(4th sub)}	(Republic of Ireland) Padraig Parkinson ^{(took time-out), (8th sub)}	(Republic of Ireland) Don Fagan ^{(4th elimination, by Ulliott)}
(Sweden) Ken Lennaárd ^{(6th sub)}	(Sweden) Bengt Sonnert ^{(1st elimination, by Liebert)}	N/A
(United States) Andy Bloch ^{(5th sub)}	(United States) Kathy Liebert ^{(9th sub)}	(United States) Robert Williamson III ^{(3rd elimination, by Fagan)}

== 2007 Event ==
The 2007 event aired in March 2007 featuring teams representing Great Britain, USA, Germany, Sweden, Denmark and the Netherlands with the winning team receiving $100,000 prize money.
