= Ram Vaswani =

English poker player (born 1970)

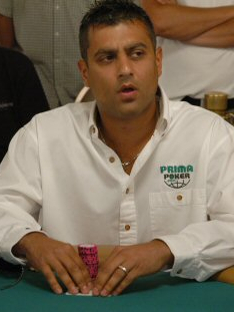
- Vaswani at the 2005 World Series of Poker
- Nickname: Crazy Horse

World Series of Poker
- Bracelet: 1
- Money finishes: 15
- Highest WSOP Main Event finish: None

World Poker Tour
- Title: None
- Final table: None
- Money finish: 1

European Poker Tour
- Title: 1
- Final tables: 4
- Money finishes: 6

Ram "Crazy Horse" Vaswani (born 1 September 1970, from Finchley, Greater London) a former professional poker player and the youngest member of The Hendon Mob, a group of professional poker players. He resides in Finchley with his wife Jackie and daughter Hollie.

Vaswani became a regular on the poker circuit, and due to his involvement in Late Night Poker, he also became one of the pioneers of poker on television. He is the first (and to date only) person to reach 4 European Poker Tour (EPT) final tables. The latest being at Monte Carlo 2007 (eliminated first, on the first hand) one of those final tables bought a win, the Dublin Season 2 (2004) event. He won his first World Series of Poker bracelet in 2007, in the $1,500 Limit Hold'em Shootout event.

His other televised appearances include a win in the Poker Nations Cup, and runner-up in finishes in two more televised events.

== Poker career ==
=== Early years ===
Vaswani, of Indian origin, began playing cards from the age of 9, and at the age of 12, he organised a low-stakes poker game with friends on a trip to Wales. Their teacher stopped them playing, so they ended up playing for sweets instead. Vaswani has long considered seven-card stud to be the most skilful poker variant, and built up his early poker knowledge playing the £100 game at the Victoria Casino on Edgware Road.

Vaswani met Joe Beevers in Luton when placing bets on dog racing and they later set up a private poker game together. It was in one of these games that they met both Barny and Ross Boatman. Together, the four became known as The Hendon Mob and became regulars on the European poker tournament circuit. In the first published article on The Hendon Mob, journalist and poker expert Victoria Coren publicised Vaswani's nickname The Looks, referring to his claimed status as the best-looking of the group. Soon after, Vaswani began using the nickname Crazy Horse, sharing his nickname with the Lakota leader Tashunca-uitco.

Vaswani and the rest of The Mob were invited by Nic Szeremeta to appear in the brand new Late Night Poker television series. Vaswani appeared in each of the show's 6 series, reaching the series 2 Grand Final and the series 4 and 5 Semi-finals.

Vaswani's first major tournament win happened at the HFl 5,000 LIDO tournament at the Master Classics of Poker tournament in Amsterdam in 1999. At the time, this was Europe's most prestigious tournament, but he was broke and had to borrow money from Joe Beevers to stake in a cash game to build up money for the entry fee.

=== The WSOP and beyond ===
Vaswani first finished in the money of a World Series of Poker (WSOP) event in the 2001 $3,000 no limit Texas hold 'em event won by Erik Seidel. The next year, he had a 3rd-place finish in the $2,000 limit hold 'em event, and a 2nd-place finish in the $2,000½ hold 'em – 1/2 seven-card stud event. He made three final tables in the 2004, with his best finish being 3rd place in the $3,000 no limit hold 'em event. In 2007, Vaswani became the first member of the Mob to win a WSOP bracelet, winning $217,438 in the $1,500 limit hold 'em shootout event.

The following year, he made the final table of the $10,000 World Championship Omaha Hi-Lo Split event, finishing 7th. His most recent WSOP cash was in the Main Event of the 2009 World Series of Poker Europe, where he finished 15th and earned £40,481 ($66,738 at the time of the event).

Vaswani has also made 4 final tables on the European Poker Tour (EPT). In the first season, he won the Dublin event and finished 2nd to Noah Boeken in the Copenhagen event. In the second season, he finished 5th in Deauville. He also made the final table of the Season 3 Main Event, where he finished 8th. His EPT final table tally is double the next best total, held several other players, including Marc Karam, Marcel Lüske and Noah Boeken (The record belongs to Luca Pagano, who has made 6 finals tables).

His other major tournament victories include:

- £500 pot limit seven-card stud, European Poker Classic 2000
- €5,000 European Hold'em Championship, Euro Finals of Poker 2002
- £500 pot limit seven-card stud, Poker Classics 2003
- £500 no limit hold'em, Midland Masters 2003
- Poker Nations Cup 2006

Vaswani was also a quarter-finalist in the 2003 World Heads-Up Poker Championship, runner-up to Harry Demetriou in the 2004 Victor Chandler Poker Cup, and a finalist in the pot limit hold 'em Gaming Club World Poker Championship.

He finished runner-up in the 2005 William Hill Poker Grand Prix, following a bad beat against eventual winner Phil Laak. However, commentator Lucy Rokach repeatedly laid claim to him being the best player in the 64-player field, that included former World Champion Scotty Nguyen and WSOP bracelet winners Donnacha O'Dea and Brian Wilson. (Simon Trumper has also referred to him as "the best tournament player in Europe, especially in No Limit.")

As of 2009, his total live tournament winnings are exceed $3.2 million. His 15 cashes at the Las Vegas WSOP account for $846,229 of those winnings.

Vaswani appeared in Late Night Poker Masters in late 2006 on Channel 4, in the same heat as season 6 champion Peter Costa and Willie Tann, but did not progress.

Vaswani has written over 20 articles for The Hendon Mob's website, and a poker lesson for Matthew Hilger's site internettexasholdem.com.

Vaswani regularly plays $100–$200 no limit hold 'em online, and is sponsored by Full Tilt Poker. He has also played $200–$400 pot limit Omaha on the site, where he has won pots in excess of $160,000.

== Other gambling ==
Vaswani has been described as "an avid gambler who 'would bet on anything that moves'". This has led to him being known for having a fluctuating bankroll due to the variance in his sports betting hobby. Joe Beevers has indicated that Vaswani will often have $100,000 in his pocket one day; but it will be gone the next. Vaswani has indicated he is not too concerned about the outcome of bets he makes, so long as he has made the right decision in each case.

Vaswani is also a keen golfer, and has had large financial upswings and downswings as a result of wagering on his game. Also, during the 888.com Poker Nations Cup, Vaswani made numerous large wagers with the Swedish team, and staked large amounts of money on Chinese poker, which he considers to be a game of pure luck.
