= Ben Roberts (poker player) =

British poker player (born 1956)

- Nickname: The Gentleman
- Born: Mehdi Javdani; 3 November 1956 (age 70); Iran

World Series of Poker
- Bracelet: None
- Money finishes: 7
- Highest WSOP Main Event finish: 6th, 1998

World Poker Tour
- Title: None
- Final table: 1
- Money finishes: 3

Benjamin (Ben) Roberts (born Mehdi Javdani (Persian: مهدی جاودانی) on 3 November 1956 in Iran) is a British professional poker player based in London.

== Poker career ==
In 1998 he almost made the final table of the World Series of Poker Main Event. He finished sixth and received $150,000, but as he and Jan Lundberg were both eliminated in the same hand, the final table that year consisted of just 5 players. In his final hand, his pocket Aces, along with Lundberg's pocket tens, lost to Scotty Nguyen's Ace-Queen of Diamonds when Nguyen hit a flush on the river.

In 2002 he made an appearance on Late Night Poker. He finished 3rd in his heat, ahead of such players as Ross Boatman, Daniel Negreanu and Malcolm Harwood.

In 2004 he made his first final table of the World Poker Tour (WPT), where he finished 5th in the third season Grand Prix de Paris event won by Surinder Sunar. Roberts won €101,980 at the event.

In 2005 he made the final table of the VC Cup for £ 50,000. He competed in the World Speed Poker Open. In the same year he also became the 5th entrant in the European Poker Players Hall of Fame.

As of 2023, his total live tournament winnings exceed $1.4 million.

== Other activities ==
Roberts was a County Table Tennis Champion in 1978 and the English Snooker Champion in 1979.

Roberts legally changed his name when he got married in the late 1970s. He went on to have 3 children. Jamie Roberts, Rebecca Roberts and Sebastian Roberts. He is also fond of jazz music.
