= Peter Costa =

Peter Costa may refer to:

- Peter Costa (poker player) (born 1956), British poker player
- Peter Costa (actor), former American child actor
