= Luke Schwartz =

English poker player (born 1984)

- Nickname: __FullFlush1__
- Born: 15 February 1984 (age 42)

World Series of Poker
- Bracelet: 1
- Final table: 1
- Money finishes: 3
- Highest WSOP Main Event finish: 249th, 2013

European Poker Tour
- Title: None
- Final tables: 5
- Money finishes: 7

Luke Schwartz-Orbach (born 15 February 1984) known as Luke Schwartz is a professional poker player from north London, England.

== Poker career ==
Schwartz's first major cash was at the Grosvenor World Masters in 2005 where he won £3,900 for his eighth-place finish in the £1,000 No Limit Hold'em Main Event. Since then, he has only had a few other results, including £10,850 at the 2005 Harbour Lights in Brighton.

Schwartz is best known for his online prowess, especially on Full Tilt Poker before the site was shut down, where he played under the moniker __FullFlush1__. He started off grinding ring games in 2005 but went broke several times before winning the Sunday Million on Poker Stars in 2007. After this win, Schwartz returned to the cash tables. In recent times, he has taken on some of the biggest names in online poker such as Urindanger, durrrr, and Ziigmund, at the biggest stakes with some success.

Luke Schwartz has played in the Party Poker Premier League several times including Party Poker Premier League 4 where he finished second and won $200,000, beaten by David Benyamine.

Schwartz is known for his public comments and opinions, both during poker games and in other settings. His statements have been widely discussed by the media and the public. He regards himself as the best tournament player around, and even made his claim at the Monte Carlo High Rollers event to the rest of his table, which included Daniel Negreanu and Phil Ivey.

In December 2009, Schwartz was chip leader heading into the Full Tilt Poker Million VIII final table, and eventually finished fourth, collecting prize money of $150,000. Schwartz had previously won his heat in the Poker Million VIII, overcoming a table of Bill Edler, Mark Vos and Tony G, before coming from behind to defeat John Duthie heads-up. He then navigated a semi-final featuring Annette Obrestad and Tony Bloom to secure his place in the final. In 2012 at World Series of Poker [the poker players championship] Schwartz finished fourth for over $400,000. According to High Stakes Database, Schwartz’ cash game losses stand at $775,000.

Schwartz is currently a featured blogger on Black Belt Poker. His comments, many of which divide audiences, are often cited on forums such as Two Plus Two.

As of 2023, his live tournament winnings exceed $1.7 million.
