= Celebrity Poker =

Celebrity Poker may refer to:

- Celebrity Poker Showdown, an American TV game show 2003–2006
- Celebrity Poker Club, a British TV series 2003–2005

== See also ==
- Poker
