= Ross Boatman =

English actor and poker player (born 1964)

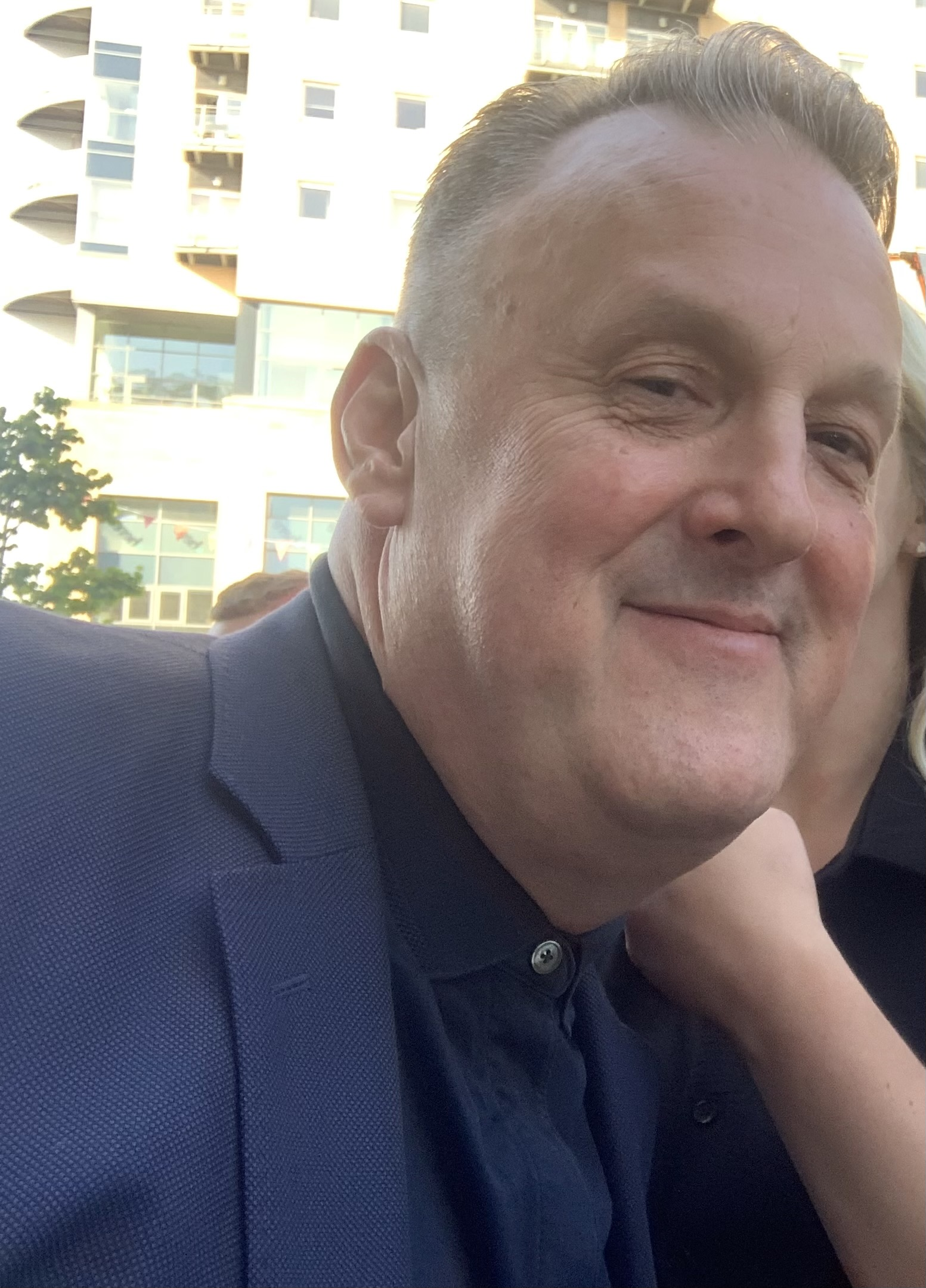
- Boatman in 2023
- Nickname: Rocky Ross
- Born: Ross Maxim Boatman; 3 March 1964 (age 62); King's Cross, London, England

World Series of Poker
- Money finishes: 12
- Highest WSOP Main Event finish: 34th, 2002

World Poker Tour
- Money finishes: 3

European Poker Tour
- Final table: 1
- Money finish: 1

Ross Maxim Boatman (born 3 March 1964) is an English actor, professional poker player and a member of the poker-playing group the Hendon Mob. He is known for the role of firefighter Kevin Medhurst in the ITV drama series London's Burning from 1988 to 1995 and again in 2000. He appeared as Derek in the BBC Two sitcom Mum from 2016 to 2019, before starring in Stay Close on Netflix in 2021, and then joined the cast of the BBC One soap opera EastEnders as Harvey Monroe.

== Early life ==
Boatman was born in Camden, London.

== Career ==
=== Acting ===
After completing his training at RADA, Boatman began his acting career in fringe theatre. He began working as a television actor in 1988, appearing in an episode of The StoryTeller ("The Luck Child") and Dramarama, before earning his best-known role as fireman Kevin Medhurst in the long-running television series London's Burning. Boatman portrayed Medhurst in over 100 episodes between 1988 and 1995, and again in 2000. His other television roles include A Touch of Frost, three episodes of The Bill (in 2006 and 2 episodes in 2009), Murder in Mind, Dream Team, and ITV's 2005 drama Planespotting. He appeared in the award-winning West End play Dealer's Choice by Patrick Marber. Boatman starred in a NatWest bank television advertisement in 2015 playing a father who struggled with his utility bills.

On the big screen, Boatman has appeared in the gangster film Hard Men and as a rock star in the comedy Bring Me the Head of Mavis Davis. He famously turned down a role in Lock, Stock and Two Smoking Barrels as he had just completed filming Hard Men and feared being typecast. More recently, Boatman has appeared in alongside Clive Owen and Charlotte Rampling in the Mike Hodges film I'll Sleep When I'm Dead. Boatman has maintained he has a preference for acting rather than poker, although he finds poker easier to profit from. In June 2021, his casting on the BBC soap opera EastEnders was announced. Boatman made his debut appearance as Harvey Monroe in July 2021. For his portrayal of the role, he won the British Soap Award for Best Newcomer.

=== Poker ===
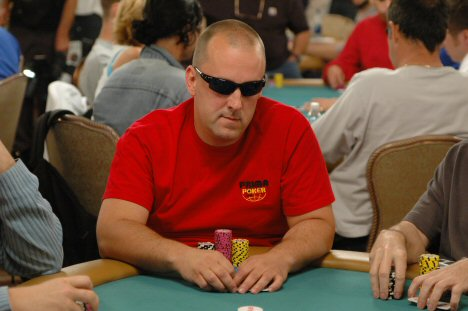
Ross Boatman in a World Series of Poker Omaha event.

In the 1970s, Boatman observed his older brother Barny playing poker against his friends at their house. He begged to become involved in the game, and although initially dissuaded by his brother, he sat down and played his first poker session. Barny went on to teach him in the mid-'70s, and by the age of 12 Boatman was gambling at "pitch and toss" behind his school gym. In the early 1980s, he regularly observed a poker game in his local pool hall, where he learnt the basics of poker strategy. Soon after he began playing poker events whenever he had the opportunity, and turned professional in 1992.

Together with his brother, Boatman began attending a poker game in North London run by Joe Beevers and Ram Vaswani. The four quickly formed an ongoing friendship, and began travelling to poker events throughout Europe together. This became such a regular sight that the four were later dubbed "The Hendon Mob". Ross and the rest of the Hendon Mob were invited by Nic Szeremeta to appear in the brand new Late Night Poker television series, and supported the then-questionable idea of using a hole cam to make poker into a spectator sport. He appeared in all 6 series of the show, but had his best run at the title in the second season. He reached the final by defeating Hemish Shah in the runners-up final to advance to the grand final, where he finished 2nd to Simon Trumper.

Like the rest of the Hendon Mob, Boatman has become a regular fixture at the World Series of Poker (WSOP), where he made his first final table in 2002 in the pot limit Omaha event. He finished 7th in the event, where he and Barny became the first brothers to make the same WSOP final table. In the same year he finished in the money of the $10,000 no limit Texas hold 'em main event, eventually going out in 34th place out of 631 entrants. Boatman has also had success in the European Poker Tour (EPT), where he made the final table of its largest ever event – the second grand final, finishing in 6th place for €140,000.

His titles include:

- FF 3,000 no limit hold 'em, Autumn Tournament 1999;
- £100 pot limit hold 'em, Christmas Cracker 2001;
- €300 pot limit Omaha, Austrian Masters 2002;
- £2,000 no limit hold 'em, European Poker Championships 2002;
- €400 pot limit Omaha, Irish Winter Tournament 2002;
- £200 pot limit Omaha hi-lo, British Open 2004.

In addition to the above, Boatman has written over 20 articles on The Hendon Mob's website and also authored a poker lesson for internettexasholdem.com. After 3 years of sponsorship by the Prima Poker Network, he is now sponsored by Full Tilt Poker. As of 2024, his total live tournament winnings exceed $2,000,000.

== Personal life ==
His partner is photographer Sarah Jeynes. Boatman lives in Holloway and has three children.

== Filmography ==
=== Film ===
Year	Title	Role	Notes
1987	The Finding	Policeman	Television film
1989	Tank Malling	Security Guard	
1996	Hard Men	Bear	
1997	Bring Me the Head of Mavis Davis	Rock Star	
2002	Turner – The Man Who Painted Britain	Turner	Television film
2003	Danielle Cable: Eyewitness	Policeman	Television film
2003	I'll Sleep When I'm Dead	Malone, Chauffeur	
2004	Wall of Silence	DC Ian Ashby	Television film
2004	Can't Buy Me Love	DS Colin Briggs	Television film
2005	Planespotting	Steve Rush	Television film
2005	X-Mass	Dad	Short film
2005	Ripley Under Ground	Taxi Cab Driver	
2006	Good Girl, Bad Girl	Joshua	Television film
2006	Penelope	Cheery Dealer	
2007	Cassandra's Dream	Detective	
2010	Sex & Drugs & Rock & Roll	Pub Landlord	
2013	Three Stops Down From Plaistow	Charlie	Short film
2014	Paddington	Trader	
2015	Hooligans at War: North vs. South	Charlie	
2015	Essex Boys: Law of Survival	Franks	
2020	Bicycle Thief	John	Short film

=== Television ===
Year	Title	Role	Notes
1988	The Storyteller	Page	Episode: "The Luck Child"
1988	All in Good Faith	Trevor Collins	Episode: "The Prodigal Son"
1988	Dramarama	Soldier	Episode: "Now You See Them"
1988–1995, 2000	London's Burning	Kevin Medhurst	Main role
1989	Screen Two	Gary Austin	Episode: "Death of a Son"
1999	A Touch of Frost	Owen Kimble	Episode: "Private Lives"
1999	Daylight Robbery	Alan McArdale	Main role
1999	The Bill	Steve Bennett	Episode: "Security"
2001	Swallow	Bob	1 episode
2002	The Estate Agents	Spencer	Episode: "Gangsters"
2002	Murder in Mind	Detective Superintendent Pryce	Episode: "Rage"
2006	Dream Team	Fraser Hibbs	Episode: "War of the Roses"
2006	The Bill	Ricky Lasiter	Episode: "Mistaken and Misspoken"
2009	The Bill	Kenny Bordmann	2 episodes
2010	Holby City	Alexi Zjasvic	Episode: "Skipping a Beat"
2011	DCI Banks	DI Richard Brownlow	Episode: "Cold Is the Grave: Part 1"
2012	Secret State	Michael	Miniseries
2014	The Secrets	Dave	Episode: "The Return"
2016–2019	Mum	Derek	Main role
2017	Casualty	John Galloway	Episode: "Break Point"
2019	Endeavour	Mac Honeydew	Episode: "Apollo"
2019	London Kills	Graham Evans	Episode: "Connected"
2019	Temple	Victor	Miniseries
2020	Grantchester	Vic Morgan	Recurring role
2021	Stay Close	Del Flynn	5 episodes
2021–present	EastEnders	Harvey Monroe	Regular role
