= Blind man's bluff (poker) =

Poker variant

Blind Man's Bluff
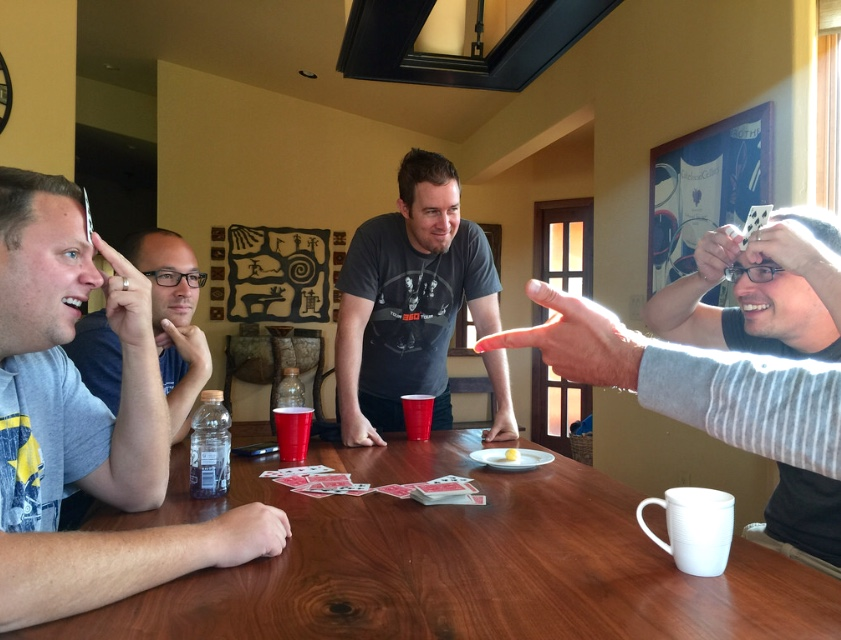
- A modern game of Blind Man's Bluff being played.
- Alternative names: Indian poker, squaw poker, Oklahoma forehead, or Indian head
- Type: Poker
- Players: 2+, usually 2–8
- Skills: Probability, psychology
- Cards: 52
- Rank (high→low): A K Q J 10 9 8 7 6 5 4 3 2

Blind man's bluff (also called Indian poker, squaw poker, Oklahoma forehead, Good For You and Indian head) is a version of poker that is unconventional in that each person sees the cards of all players except their own.

In the standard version, the person with the highest card wins. Each player is dealt one card that they display to all other players (traditionally stuck to the forehead facing outwards, supposedly like an Indian feather). This is followed by a round of betting. Players attempt to guess if they have the highest card based on the distribution of visible cards and how other players are betting.

Other versions (forehead stud) are variations on stud poker, in which one or more of the hole cards is hidden from its owner, but shown to all other players, as above. During its coverage of the 2004 World Series of Poker, ESPN showed a blind man's bluff version of Texas hold 'em. Blind man's bluff is commonly referred to as 'Oklahoma forehead' throughout the central United States.

The first Blind Man's Bluff World Championship took place at the Paddy Power Poker Irish Winter Festival in October 2010.
