= Celebrity Poker Club =

- Narrated by: Jesse May; Barny Boatman; Grub Smith; Victoria Coren
- Country of origin: United Kingdom
- No. of series: 3

Production
- Producer: Cayt Dear
- Production company: Presentable

Original release
- Network: Challenge
- Release: 16 October 2003 – 2005

Celebrity Poker Club is a British television series featuring celebrities playing poker. It aired on Challenge for three series from 2003 to 2005 as a spin-off from Channel 4's popular Late Night Poker series. Liam Flood was the casino manager for the series, and Cayt Dear was the producer.

== Commentators ==
- Series 1: Jesse May and Barny Boatman
- Series 2: Jesse May and Grub Smith
- Series 3: Jesse May and Victoria Coren, with backstage interviews by Helen Chamberlain

== Series finalists ==
Season	Winner	Prize	Runner-up	Other finalists	Semi-finalists
1	Sir Clive Sinclair	£25,000	Keith Allen	Cindy Blake; Zac Goldsmith; Stephen Hendry; Gladstone Small; John McCririck; Tony Cascarino	Fiona Foster; Sam West; Nolan Hemmings; Grub Smith; John Bishop; Nigel Lindsay
2	Victoria Coren	£25,000	Willie Thorne	Barry Hearn; Norman Pace; Roger DeCourcey; Tom Parker Bowles; Steve Davis; Eric Bristow	Jonny Gould; Raj Persaud; Jesse Birdsall; Matt Born; Fiona Foster; Jon Ronson
3	A. D. Bower	£25,000	Edward Giddins	Michael Greco; Mike Tindall; Alexander Armstrong; Richard Herring; Richard Orford	Kitty Flanagan; Craig Charles; Oliver Chris; Lucy Porter; James Hewitt; Anne Savage

Other celebrities featured have included Dave Gorman, Rory McGrath, Dexter Fletcher, Dennis Taylor, Louise Wener, Nick Leeson, Howard Marks, Charles Ingram, Martin Amis, Al Alvarez, Phil Taylor, Hattie Hayridge, Johnny Vegas, Darren Campbell, Phil Daniels, Graham Linehan, Ally McCoist, Colin Murray and Michael Praed.

Several celebrities playing in the tournament were put forward by celebpoker.com.
