= Thomas Kremser =

Austrian poker player

Thomas Kremser is a poker professional, working in the industry since 1988. He is a consultant and executive in tournament administration. He is the chief executive of TK Poker Events, a company specialized in organising poker events.

His career started in Vienna in 1993 when he worked as a casino manager at the concord card casino which was built and owned by two business partners named Norbert Darrie and Gerhard Brodnik. Together with John Duthie he created the European Poker Tour and was its Executive Tournament Director he was in charge of all live events for the first seven years. In May 2011, Kremser officially parted ways with the EPT.

He has also been in charge of events on the World Poker Tour and numerous other tours and events. From 1999 till 2011 he was consulting and directing British television series Late Night Poker, a cult hit on Channel 4 in the UK.

In 2001, Kremser was awarded the European Poker Awards' Casino Staff Person of the Year, and was nominated again every year from 2003 to 2007. At the 2007 awards, Kremser was awarded the European Poker Awards' Lifetime Achievement award.

Kremser regularly comments on The Hendon Mob's website's "You are the Tournament Director" series of articles. He is a recognized leader in development of rules.

Kremser married former Late Night Poker dealer Marina Rado in 2005.

He has won over $140,000 in live earnings.
