= Malcolm Harwood =

English poker player (born 1938)

- Nickname(s): The Rock
- Born: 1938 (age 86–87); Oxford, England

Malcolm Harwood (born 1938 in Oxford) is an English professional poker player who learnt how to play whilst doing his National Service. He later appeared in Channel 4's Late Night Poker, where he reached the Grand Final in seasons 1, 2, and 5. He also won the European Championship in 1992 and the Scottish Masters in 1997.

In 2005 he appeared on the poker chat show Heads Up with Richard Herring to discuss his career. Malcolm has also appeared several times as a commentator on Poker Night Live.

Harwood's Thai wife, Somkhuan, also plays poker and appeared in the Late Night Poker series.

Malcolm now runs his own poker website and discussion forum. His career earnings exceed $125,000.
