= Barny Boatman =

English poker player (born 1956)

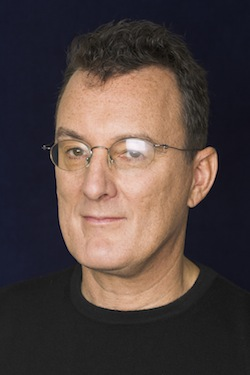
- Boatman in 2005
- Nickname: Barmy Barny
- Born: Barny M. P. Boatman; January 1, 1956 (age 70); St Pancras, London, England

World Series of Poker
- Bracelets: 2
- Final tables: 16
- Money finishes: 80
- Highest WSOP Main Event finish: 16th, 2000

World Poker Tour
- Title: None
- Final table: None
- Money finishes: 6

European Poker Tour
- Title: 1
- Final tables: 2
- Money finishes: 7

Barny M. Boatman (born 10 January 1956) is an English professional poker player and the oldest member of the poker-playing foursome known as The Hendon Mob. He is the older brother of Ross Boatman, and resides in Archway.

During his lengthy poker career, Boatman became one of the pioneers of poker on television by regularly appearing in the Late Night Poker television series. He was also the first person to reach three consecutive final tables at the World Series of Poker (WSOP), and came close to winning a WSOP bracelet. In 2013, Boatman won his first career World Series of Poker bracelet in Event #49, $1,500 No-Limit Hold'em, winning $546,080. In February 2024, Boatman won the European Poker Tour Paris main event for €1,287,800, his largest live cash to date. As of February 2024, he has over $5.4 million in live tournament winnings.

== Early years ==
Boatman grew up to socialist parents in Somers Town, London. He left school at his earliest opportunity, following pressure from his ongoing truancy. He went on to travel for some time early in his life, and has both lived and worked in Barcelona, Australia, Hong Kong, and Sri Lanka. He has worked as a bartender, builder, English teacher, journalist, computer programmer (for P&O), and as a legal advisor in Bermondsey, where he never lost a trial. He credits a near-death experience he had in a motorcycle accident, and the death of his younger sister Jo from cancer of giving him a sense of perspective in life. Boatman's hobbies include sky diving, snowboarding, and scuba diving. He is the godfather to his brother Ross' son.

Boatman used to play poker at home with friends and later taught his brother, Ross, how to play. They began to attend poker tournaments together at the Vic on Edgware Road, where he won the first tournament he entered, a seven-card stud event paying around £2,000. Together they went to a private poker game run by Joe Beevers and Ram Vaswani, with whom they became good friends. The four went on to be called The Hendon Mob. Together, they were invited by Nic Szeremeta to take part in the brand new Late Night Poker television series, where he reached the Grand Finals in series 3 and 4. During series 5 and 6, he commentated for the show, alongside Jesse May.

== Poker career ==
=== World Series of Poker ===
Boatman first cashed in a World Series of Poker (WSOP) event in 2000 in the $3,000 no limit hold'em event. 4 days later he finished in the money in the $10,000 no limit hold'em main event, finishing in 16th place. (According to the James McManus book Positively Fifth Street, he was the chip leader for much of the tournament.) He also finished in the money of the main event in 2001 (33rd) and 2006 (854th).

Boatman narrowly missed out on a WSOP bracelet in the 2002 $2,000 pot limit hold'em event. His runner-up finish earned him $77,160 after outlasting a field including Erik Seidel, Johnny Chan, Phil Gordon, and John Juanda. This 2nd-place finish was one of a record three back-to-back final tables, which earned him a win in the European Poker Awards Tournament Performance of the Year category. He also finished one place off a fourth consecutive final table.

At the 2013 WSOP, Boatman bested a field of 2,247 entries to win Event #49, $1,500 No-Limit Hold'em. He defeated Brian O'Donoghue in a three-hour, back-and-forth heads-up match to win his first bracelet and $546,080.

Boatman also won another bracelet in 2015, at the World Series Of Poker Europe, in Berlin, Germany. He won Event #7, €550 Pot Limit Omaha for €54,725.

=== Other poker activities ===
Boatman made the final table of the first Poker Million tournament. He also made the final table of the first ever Showdown Poker Tour event, finishing runner-up to Mats Gavatin.

His major titles include:

- L. 500,000 limit seven-card stud, 7th Torneo Di Poker, Slovenia, 1998
- FIM 1,000 pot limit Holdem/Omaha, Helsinki Freezeout, 1999
- £500 pot limit seven-card stud, European Poker Championships 2002
- $300 pot limit Omaha, Four Queens Poker Classic 2003
- €1,500 no limit hold'em, Helsinki Freezeout, 2003
- £500 no limit hold'em, Luton Christmas Cracker, 2003
- €5,300 no limit hold'em, EPT Paris, 2024

In 2005, Boatman appeared on the chatshow Heads Up with Richard Herring to discuss his life, career, and his love of poker. In addition to Late Night Poker, he has commentated for Poker Million, World Heads-Up Poker Championship, Celebrity Poker Club, European Poker Tour, Poker Nations Cup, and Victor Chandler Poker Cup. He also starred in his own series "Barny's Home Games" where he attended home poker games throughout Great Britain.

As of 2024, his total live tournament winnings exceed $5,475,000.

In addition, Boatman is a member of the Gutshot Card Club and was sponsored by Full Tilt Poker. He has written over 50 articles for The Hendon Mob's website, and two online poker lessons for Matthew Hilger's site Internettexasholdem.com.

In March 2026, Boatman signed with Partypoker as part of the PartyPoker Tour ambassador team.
