= Bring Me the Head of Mavis Davis =

- UK DVD cover
- Directed by: John Henderson
- Written by: Craig Strachan
- Story by: Joanne Reay
- Produced by: Stephen Colegrave; Joanne Reay
- Starring: Rik Mayall; Jane Horrocks; Danny Aiello; Ronald Pickup; Philip Martin Brown
- Cinematography: Clive Tickner
- Edited by: Paul Endacott
- Music by: Christopher Tyng
- Production company: BBC Films
- Distributed by: Feature Film Company
- Release dates: July 1997 (Moscow); 16 January 1998
- Running time: 100 minutes
- Country: United Kingdom
- Language: English
- Box office: £63,956 (UK)

Bring Me the Head of Mavis Davis is a British comedy film directed by John Henderson, originally released in 1997. The film stars Rik Mayall, Jane Horrocks, Danny Aiello and Ross Boatman. The title and plot reference Peckinpah's Bring Me the Head of Alfredo Garcia. It was entered into the 20th Moscow International Film Festival.

== Plot ==
Record-company owner Marty Starr concludes that Marla Dorland, aka Mavis Davis is a fading star. Meanwhile, he has to meet alimony payments to his ex, while he's forced to promote the untalented son of mobster, Rathbone. To get out from under, Marty decides that the death of Marla/Mavis could jolt record sales by turning her into a legend. He hires hitman Clint, but eliminating Mavis turns out to be more difficult than they thought.

== Cast ==
- Rik Mayall as Marty Starr
- Jane Horrocks as Mavis Davis
- Danny Aiello as Mr. Rathbone
- Ronald Pickup as Percy Stone
- Philip Martin Brown as Inspector Furse
- Heathcote Williams as Jeff
- Marc Warren as Clint
- Mark Heap as Duncan
- Paul Keating as Paul Rathbone
- Ross Boatman as Rock Star

== Reception ==
In Variety, Derek Elley wrote, "Both Mayall (Drop Dead Fred) and Horrocks (Life Is Sweet, Bubbles in AbFab) have yet to find bigscreen niches for their considerable comedic talents, and though both have their moments here, Craig Strachan’s script is a generally dull blade for their cutting humor." Bob McCabe of Empire said, "The credits claim this is 'based on an original idea' by Joanne Reay, but there's very little originality on display here, with the hackneyed plot merely window-dressed with some rock and roll trappings."
