= Tic-tac (horse racing) =

Signing method used by bookmakers

Tic-tac (also tick-tack and non-hyphenated variants) is a traditional method of signs used by bookmakers to communicate the odds of certain horses. Until the turn of the 21st century it was a very common sight on racecourses in the UK, but with the advent of mobile technology it is now seldom seen. In 1999, only three practitioners were noted to be still working on the southern UK tracks – Micky 'Hokey' Stuart, Billie Brown and Rocky Roberts. A tic-tac man will usually wear bright white gloves to make his hand movements easily seen.

In a newspaper interview in March 1937 Charles Adamson, a retired bookmaker of Ashford, Middlesex, said he and his brother Jack (John Thomas Adamson) had invented the tic-tac system and first began to use it in 1888.

A few simple examples of signals:

- Odds of 1/1 or evens (“levels you devils”) – Extend forefingers on each hand, move up and down in opposite directions several times.
- Odds of 9/4 ("top of the head") – both hands touching the top of the head.
- Odds of 6/4 ("ear'ole") – the palm of the right hand touches the left ear or vice versa.
- Odds of 2/1 ("bottle") – right hand touches nose.
- Odds of 10/1 ("cockle" or "net") – fists together with the right-hand thumb protruding upwards, to resemble the number 10
- Odds of 11/10 ("tips") – hands together and touching all fingers on both hands together
- Odds of 5/4 ("wrist") – the right hand is moved to touch the left wrist.
- Odds of 33/1 ("double carpet") – arms crossed, hands flat against the chest

Within the UK there are some regional variations in the signals, for example in the south odds of 6/4 are represented by the hand touching the opposite ear, giving the slang term "ear'ole", whereas the same odds are indicated in the north by the hand touching the opposite elbow ("half arm").

Some of the signals may be called out verbally too. These names have evolved over time in a mixture of Cockney rhyming slang and backslang. For example, 4–1 is known as rouf (four backwards).

Essentially, bookmakers use tic-tac as a way of communicating between their staff and ensuring their odds are not vastly different from their competitors', an advantage the punters could otherwise exploit. In particular, if a very large bet is placed with one bookmaker, this may be signalled to the others as a way of lowering the price on all the boards.

British racing pundit John McCririck used tic-tac as part of his pieces to camera when explaining the odds of the horses for the next race.

While this method of communication is used less frequently than before, many of the terms persist.
