= Willie Tann =

Singaporean poker player

- Nicknames: The Dice Man, The Governor, Mr Miyagi
- Born: Singapore

World Series of Poker
- Bracelet: 1
- Money finishes: 7
- Highest WSOP Main Event finish: 77th, 2007

World Poker Tour
- Money finish: 1

European Poker Tour
- Final table: None
- Money finishes: 3

Willie Tann is an English professional poker player. Tann was born in Singapore and moved to England to study law in the 1960s.

Tann made one appearance on the original televised poker show Late Night Poker, finishing 3rd in his heat behind Padraig Parkinson and Ken Lennaárd. In later years he would also play in the European Poker Tour.

Tann mentored Zac Goldsmith (editor of The Ecologist) in poker, leading Goldsmith to his 3rd-place finish in the 2004 Poker Million.

Tann made a final table at the $1,500 Pot Limit Omaha event of the 2000 World Series of Poker (WSOP), receiving $26,910 for his 4th-place finish behind Johnny Chan. In 2005 he won a WSOP bracelet in the $1,000 No Limit Hold'em event, to take home a prize of $188,335. In the 2007 World Series of Poker Tann cashed in the money for the first time in the $10,000 No Limit Hold'em Main Event coming in 77th place out of a field of 6,358 players, winning $106,382

At one time Tann was a spokesman for Betfairpoker. He qualified for the 2005 WSOP Main Event via an online tournament on the site, eliminating the site founder Andrew Black in the process.

As of 2015, his total live tournament winnings exceed $1,900,000.

Tann has numerous nicknames on the poker circuit. Although usually called "The Dice Man", he also goes by the monikers '"The Governor" and "Mister Miyagi".

Tann lives in Bovingdon, Hertfordshire. He is married and has one son.
