= Martin Wendt =

Danish poker player

- Nickname: None

World Series of Poker
- Bracelet: None
- Money finish: 1
- Highest WSOP Main Event finish: 467th, 2006

World Poker Tour
- Title: None
- Final table: 1
- Money finishes: 2

European Poker Tour
- Title: None
- Final table: None
- Money finishes: 5

Martin Wendt is a Danish professional poker player.

In the 2005 Poker Million, Wendt was at one time the chip leader, but ended up finishing in 3rd place, earning $200,000.

In 2007, he won the second William Hill Poker Grand Prix, earning £175,000 ($342,707).

Wendt also captained the Danish team in the Poker Nations Cup.

As of 2024, his total live tournament winnings exceed $1,000,000.
