= Hemish Shah =

English stockbroker and poker player (1968–2001)

Neil Shah
- Born: 7 April 1968
- Died: 5 September 2001 (aged 33)

World Series of Poker
- Bracelet: 1
- Money finishes: 2
- Highest WSOP Main Event finish: None

Hemish Shah (7 April 1968 – 5 September 2001) was an English stockbroker and professional poker player. He won a World Series of Poker bracelet in 2001, and the Late Night Poker series 4, where he beat the reigning champion Simon Trumper in the final heads-up confrontation. He died of a cardiac arrest after a period of ill health.

== World Series of Poker ==
Shah won a World Series of Poker bracelet and $312,340 in 2001 for winning the $5,000 Limit Texas Hold-em event. During the event he had to leave the table at times as he was suffering from stomach cramps, but returned to win the event.

He went to hospital upon returning to England, but suffered a cardiac arrest at 03:00 GMT on 5 September 2001 and died, aged 33.

The Guardian reported 'in a world of B&H, Jack Daniels, all-nighters and steak, Hemish didn't smoke, didn't drink, talked clean, ate vegetarian, lived with his mother, honoured his religion', and his death shocked the poker world.
