= The Player Channel =

European gaming TV channel

- Former Poker Channel logo
- Country: United Kingdom
- Broadcast area: Europe

History
- Launched: 23 March 2005
- Closed: 1 October 2013
- Replaced by: Ginx TV
- Former names: The Poker Channel (2005–2012)

Links
- Website: ThePlayerChannel.com

The Player Channel, known as the Poker Channel until 3 December 2012, was a gaming TV network which broadcast to over 30 million households in 30 countries.

The Channel was typically carried in the basic packages of cable and satellite operators in Europe and classified as a sport or entertainment channel in electronic programme guides (EPGs). It broadcast 24 hours a day in all Continental Europe countries and 6.5 hours a day in the UK and Ireland on Sky Channel 166, in the entertainment section, adjacent to FX in the Sky EPG.

The Poker Channel was launched in the UK in March 2005 and broadcast poker programming including major tournaments such as the World Series of Poker, the World Poker Tour, instructional series, online events, documentaries, news and player profiles.

== History ==
The Poker Channel was formed in 2005 by Crispin Nieboer, ex-commercial manager at British Sky Broadcasting, who conceived the idea and pitched it originally to BSkyB (who turned it down, but ultimately launched their own dedicated poker channel in 2007). Nieboer raised the funding of £1.75m from Party Poker and two private investors and brought in James Hopkins, Sky Sports' producer of rugby and poker as a partner and shareholder. Hopkins was involved in the success of the first live poker tournament on television, The Poker Million, in 2000. The Channel recruited Chris White, ex Fremantle executive, as Commercial Director in 2006 to expand the company into European, Asian and Latin American markets.

The channel was first broadcast in the UK in March 2005 on channel number 265. Following an EPG re-structure by Sky in April 2006 the channel was moved to channel number 844 in Sky's new 'Gaming and Dating' section. The move resulted in a loss in viewing figures. In an attempt to regain viewing figures The Poker Channel rebranded itself as All in Sport in August 2006 and added some sports related programming. The rebranding resulted in a move to channel 444 in the Sports section of the Sky EPG. Due to Sky's broadcasting rules the channel was only able to broadcast poker programming for 4 to 6 hours a day.

On 31 December 2006 the channel decided to cease broadcasting as a 24-hour channel on Sky in the UK, due to Sky's EPG re-structure and limitations on poker programming broadcast hours, and started a long-term partnership with Sky Channel 166 (Info TV Ltd) to broadcast poker programming in a late evening slot, where the Poker Channel broadcast between 9.30pm and 4am. On 1 March 2007, to capitalise on the popularity of poker in Europe, The Poker Channel launched as a free-to-air channel on cable platforms in France (Free and Numericable) and Germany (Kabel BW), and in Finland, Norway, Sweden and Denmark on DTH satellite platform, Canal Digital.

In late 2007, The Poker Channel increased distribution in Germany (Kabel Deutschland and Unity Media) and launched with cable platforms in Belgium (BeTV and Coditel), Luxembourg (Coditel), Iceland (Skjarinn), Malta (Melita Cable) and Spain (Movistar TV). In 2008, the Channel expanded its footprint further in Finland (Welho, Maxinetti) and launched in the Netherlands, on KPN and in the digital basic package of UPC, adjacent to Eurosport in UPC's EPG, as well as in Greece (OnTelecom) and on the online TV service, Zattoo, in various European countries including Switzerland.

In 2007, the channel also extended its presence online, setting up content and marketing partnerships with online video sites including YouTube, Dailymotion, Zattoo and Blinkx.

In September 2008 The Poker Channel re-launched their web site, PokerChannelEurope.com, in partnership with online video platform Brightcove. The partnership facilitates the delivery of free advertising-supported video content on poker. The Poker Channel recruited Paul Sandells in July 2008, former UK.PokerNews.com editor, as Editor in Chief of the site.

In 2009 and 2010 the Poker Channel continued to expand its availability in Europe, including launches on all cable platforms in Portugal (Zon, Meo, Cabovisao); Neufbox (SFR) in France; Austria Telekom, Vectra and UPC in Poland, and making the channel available to all subscribers of Focussat, DigiTV and UPC Direct in Eastern Europe in Czech Republic, Romania, Hungary, Slovenia and Slovakia.

In 2010 Poker Channel partnered with media companies in Latin America to launch in Spanish language in Argentina and Mexico.

On 3 December 2012, the Poker Channel was rebranded as the Player Channel. as it increased the level of sports-betting programming on the channel, including a weekly sports-betting tipping show, Best of Bets.

In October 2013, the Player Channel was acquired by leading e-sports channel Ginx TV. The acquisition gave Ginx distribution in an additional 19 million households, including 13 million in France.

== Programming ==
The Poker Channel broadcast a range of poker-related programmes acquired from around the world, such as the World Series of Poker, the World Series of Poker Europe, the Aussie Millions, the Irish Open, the Grosvenor UK Poker Tour, the Great British Poker Tour, Poker Island TV, the World Series of Backgammon, the Million Dollar Cash Game, the Poker Nations Cup, the World Poker Crown, The World Heads-up Championship and the World Poker Tour. The Poker Channel has also commissioned or produced poker programmes such as the PokerHeaven.com European Cash Game which featured WSOP 2008 winner Peter Eastgate, the British Poker Open, Cash Game Master Class, live broadcasts of online tournaments, 12 Steps to Poker Heaven, and the European Poker Masters. With the rebrand, casino and trading shows were also added. All this programming was dropped in favour of video game programming when the channel was acquired by Ginx TV.

The channel also had a three-hour overnight slot on CNBC Europe, which broadcast six nights a week for several years across Europe, and held partnerships with other international sports and entertainment broadcasters such as TVC Deportes in Mexico.
