= Donnacha O'Dea =

Irish swimmer and poker player (born 1948)

- Nickname: The Don
- Born: 30 August 1948 (age 78)

World Series of Poker
- Bracelet: 1
- Money finishes: 23
- Highest WSOP Main Event finish: 6th, 1983

World Poker Tour
- Title: None
- Final table: None
- Money finish: 1

European Poker Tour
- Title: None
- Final table: None
- Money finish: 1

Donnacha "The Don" O'Dea (born 30 August 1948) is an Irish professional poker player. In his youth, he was a swimmer, and represented Ireland in the 1968 Olympics. He was also the first Irish swimmer to swim 100m in less than one minute. His parents were actors Denis O'Dea and Siobhán McKenna.

== Early life ==
O'Dea's parents were Siobhan McKenna and Denis O'Dea, both notable actors. He attended Synge Street CBS and went on to study at Trinity College, Dublin.

== Poker career ==
O'Dea came close to winning a WSOP bracelet in 1983 in the $1,000 Limit Hold'em event, finishing runner-up to Tom McEvoy.

He made the final table of the WSOP Main Event in 1983 when he finished 6th, which was eventually won by McEvoy, and again when he finished 9th in 1991 in the event won by Brad Daugherty. O'Dea also cashed in the Main Event in 1990 (32nd), 1994 (27th), 1996 (25th), and 2007 (171st).

In 1998, O'Dea won a WSOP bracelet in Pot Limit Omaha with rebuys event, defeating two-time WSOP Main Event champion, Johnny Chan in heads-up play.

Donnacha first appeared in the Late Night Poker television programme in series 4, finishing 5th in a heat won by Robin Keston. He returned to the show in series 6, winning his heat and going on to finish 4th in the Grand Final.

In 2004, he won the Poker Million tournament, overcoming Dave "The Devilfish" Ulliott in the eventual heads-up confrontation. The following year, he made the final table again and finished in 5th place.

O'Dea was the first member of the European Poker Players Hall of Fame.

As of 2009, his total live tournament winnings exceed $1,000,000. His 23 cashes as the WSOP account for $471,687 of those winnings.

== Personal life ==
His son, Eoghan O'Dea, is also a poker player who competes primarily online under the moniker 'intruder123'. In December 2008, he followed up a $300,000 online win with a 2nd-place finish in the Poker Million for $260,000. In 2011, he made a deep run at the Main Event of WSOP 2011 earning his place in The November Nine. He eventually finished in 6th place
