= Joe Beevers =

English poker player (born 1967)

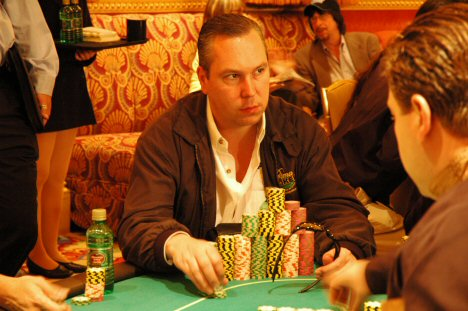
- Beevers with his trophy after winning the 2007 Poker Million
- Nickname: The Elegance
- Born: Joseph Charles Beevers; 9 December 1967 (age 58); Marylebone, London, England

World Series of Poker
- Bracelet: None
- Money finishes: 15
- Highest WSOP Main Event finish: 151st, 2005

World Poker Tour
- Title: None
- Final table: 1
- Money finish: 1

European Poker Tour
- Title: None
- Final table: None
- Money finish: 1

Joseph Charles Beevers (born 9 December 1967 in Marylebone, London) is an English professional poker player and a member of The Hendon Mob.

During his lengthy poker career, Beevers became one of the pioneers of poker on television by appearing in every series of Late Night Poker, where he made a record 3 grand finals. Beevers also won the 2007 Poker Million and finished runner-up in two further televised poker events.

== Early life ==
Beevers' father taught him how to count cards in blackjack from age 10. His father also taught Beevers how to work out permutations and probabilities on a Sinclair ZX81 computer. Beevers left school at age 16, and became a part of a card-counting team with his father and two others at age 18. They often played at the Sergeant Yorkes Casino in Luton, where they found a croupier who often paid out 3–1 on blackjacks, and sometimes also paid out when a player's hand was bust. The team eventually stopped playing as their success led to Beevers being banned from 4 London casinos, and his father being banned from 19. Between them they were banned from 21 out of 23 London casinos. They also went to gamble on horse racing events about three times a week.

Beevers worked first for NatWest (as his father had done before him) then for Citibank in Hammersmith. He went on to attend Middlesex University as a mature student towards of the end of his 4 years playing regular blackjack, and graduated with a Bachelor of Arts Honour's degree in Finance and Accounting at the age of 24.

Around this time, Beevers placed dog racing bets for future Hendon Mobster Ram Vaswani in Harrow, and they later met in Luton, starting an ongoing friendship.

== Poker career ==
Beevers began playing poker by entering a £10 pot limit stud rebuy poker tournament during a blackjack session in Luton. He went on to regularly play in a seven-card stud game in North London, where he estimates he won £35,000 to start his bankroll. By the time he finished university, he was earning well enough from playing poker and giving lessons to teachers and other students that he never returned to office work.

Prior to the emergence of televised poker, Beevers ran private poker games with Ram Vaswani. They played much pot limit Omaha there, which Beevers considers to be his preferred poker variant. It was in this game that they met Barny and Ross Boatman, the other two members of the Hendon Mob. Beevers began to travel to tournaments and won his first major event in Amsterdam in 1997. Upon winning, Beevers called his flatmate at 3am and sang Queen's "We Are the Champions" down the phone to him.

Beevers and the rest of The Hendon Mob were invited by Nic Szeremeta to appear in the brand new Late Night Poker television series, and supported the then-questionable idea of using a hole cam to make poker into a spectator sport. Beevers appeared in all 6 series of the show, and is tied with Dave Colclough for a record 10 appearances. Beevers made the Grand Final in seasons 1, 4 and 5.

Beevers was the first member of The Hendon Mob to cash in a World Series of Poker (WSOP) event, placing 14th in the $2,500 pot limit Texas hold 'em event in the 1996 World Series of Poker.

Beevers also finished as the runner-up both to Jimmy White in the 2003 Poker Million and to Xuyen Pham in The Gaming Club World Poker Championship. He also finished on the TV bubble of the World Poker Tour (WPT) season 3 championship and finished in the money of the 2005 WSOP $10,000 no limit hold'em main event.

His major titles include:

- £2500 No Limit Hold'em, Great British Poker Tour – Grand Final 2007
- Hold'em 100, 2000
- £200 pot limit Omaha, British Open 2002
- €1,000 no limit hold'em, Irish Open 2003
- £300 pot limit hold'em, Poker Classics 2003
- $5,000 no limit hold'em, Four Queens Poker Classic 2004
- Poker Nations Cup 2006 and 2008
- 2007 Poker Million

As of 2009, his total live tournament winnings exceed $2,400,000.

He is sponsored by Full Tilt Poker.

Beevers has written over 40 articles on The Hendon Mob's website, the introduction to the European edition of Michael Kaplan's book Aces and Kings (ISBN 1-84529-298-7) and two poker lessons for Matthew Hilger's website internettexasholdem.com.

== Personal life ==
Beevers' nickname "The Elegance" originates from the lifestyle he has been able to live through his poker winnings. He drives a Porsche 911 with the personalised number-plate Joe 911. In fact, Beevers is the only member of The Hendon Mob who kept his original nickname given by Victoria Coren in the first article on them, in the Evening Standard in September 2000. He is a season ticket holder at West Ham United F.C.

He has twin daughters, born 21 February 2006, named Millie and Lola.
