= John Duthie (poker player) =

London-based English television director and poker player

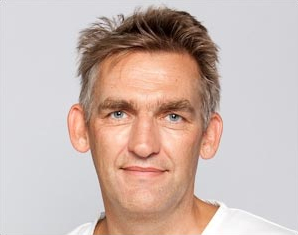
John Duthie, 2015

John Duthie (born in Leeds, Yorkshire) is a London-based English television director and creator of the television series called the European Poker Tour.

== Film and television ==
As an assistant director he worked alongside directors such as Charles Sturridge, Lewis Gilbert and Bille August on projects including Longitude, Haunted and The House of the Spirits. Having worked as a second unit director on the TV serial Kavanagh QC, he moved on to become a full-time director on television serials: As If, Clocking Off and Silent Witness, which won an RTS award for Best Editing and a BAFTA Award for Best Drama Serial. He created and executive produced the European Poker Tour series of TV programmes now in its eleventh series.

== Poker ==
He became a well-known figure on the poker circuit when he won the televised Poker Million 2000 tournament on the Isle of Man, earning £1,000,000 ($1,426,330, at the time of winning) by outlasting a final table that included Tony Bloom and Barny Boatman.

He later made four appearances on the Late Night Poker television series. In one episode he outlasted a field including Surinder Sunar, Julian Gardner and Marcel Lüske to qualify for the Series 6 Grand Final. He eventually won Series 9 of LNP beating Phil Ivey Heads up to win $200,000.

He also had a second-place finish to Mike Sexton in the 2003 European Heads-Up Championships in Paris, France, and also a 2nd-place finish in the PokerStars Spring Championship of Online Poker $25,000 heads up tournament and 2nd Place in the WSOP $10,000 heads up tournament, both in 2009. He came 2nd in WCOOP No 1 on PokerStars in 2015 winning $145,000.

As of 2015, his total live tournament winnings exceeded $3,200,000.

As of Feb 2017 he is president of partypoker LIVE, partypoker.com's new live global poker tour

== Personal life ==
Duthie is married and has two sons. He enjoys watching movies (his favourite film is On the Waterfront), and is very fond of the work of Al Alvarez. He recently revealed in an online interview that he rode bulls in Australia in 1976.
