= Jesse May =

American poker player and commentator (born 1971)

- Born: 1971 (age 54–55); New York City, U.S.
- Education: University of Chicago
- Occupations: Poker player and commentator

Jesse May (born 1971) is an American poker commentator and player.

Jesse May was born in New York City in 1971 and raised in Madison, New Jersey, where he first became hooked on poker playing with friends. In 1988, he started attending the University of Chicago, but he found that classes were clashing with his poker games, and so dropped out. For six years, Jesse travelled the world playing poker.

May found fame presenting the Late Night Poker television series. He also appeared in a season 1 episode under the pseudonym Mickey Dane. This pseudonym is in fact the main character in his poker novel, Shut Up and Deal (ISBN 1-901982-56-4).

May has continued to be involved in poker commentary on other shows, including the William Hill Poker Grand Prix, PartyPoker.com Football & Poker Legends Cup, The Irish Poker Open, Poker Nations Cup, Poker Million, Victor Chandler Poker Cup, Celebrity Poker Club, and The Poker Show. He also co-presented the PartyGammon Million, a pro backgammon tournament, on early-morning five TV.

He often commentates alongside Padraig Parkinson, who has said that it surprises him that May plays so little poker when he is such a good player.

In 2006, May signed an exclusive contract for presenting televised poker with Matchroom Sport. In January 2012, he was honoured with a Lifetime Achievement Award at the European Poker Awards for his contribution to promoting the game as an author, commentator and personality.

May is married and lives in Denmark.
