= Dave Welch (poker player) =

English poker player

World Poker Tour
- Title: None
- Final table: None
- Money finish: 1

Dave Welch is an English poker player based in St Albans, who made several appearances on the Late Night Poker television series, including the season 1 grand final and the season 6 semi-final.

His biggest cash win to date was FF 250,000 ($40,750) for winning the 1998 Euro Finals of Poker no limit hold'em poker tournament, defeating a number of players including Padraig Parkinson, Dave "Devilfish" Ulliott, Patrick Bruel and Surinder Sunar.

As of 2021, his total live tournament winnings exceeded $360,000.

Welch is married to poker player Debbie Berlin, another Late Night Poker regular.
