= Hole cam =

Camera used for televising poker games

In poker, a hole cam, short for hole camera (also known as a pocket camera or a lipstick camera) is a camera that displays a player's face-down cards (known as "hole cards") to television viewers.

The hole cam became popular in 1999 when the Late Night Poker program began using it in televised tournaments shown on British Channel 4. Cameras were also used in the Poker Million prior to gaining further popularity after the ESPN broadcasts of the 2002 World Series of Poker and the World Poker Tour began airing on the Travel Channel in 2003.

In some cases, the camera is placed under a glass panel in the table and players are instructed to place their cards over the glass (as in the case of High Stakes Poker). In other cases, the rail of the table is elevated and a small camera placed within the rail, and players are instructed to examine their cards in the usual manner, but while they're in front of the camera (as is the case on the World Series of Poker and the World Poker Tour). The goal in both cases is to allow for the filming and broadcast of the player's hole cards to the spectators without exposing them to the other players. This has led to the audience garnering a greater understanding of what is going on at the table and an increased interest in the thought processes of the players.

If the tournament is broadcast live when hole-card cameras are in use, the players and/or live audience must be sequestered from the commentators, for fear of information being relayed to the players at the table. Also, the broadcast is delayed a few minutes for additional security.

Most tournaments are not shown live, and for security purposes only a few members of the TV crew have access to the hole card images during the taping. Although during the broadcast commentators may appear to be present at the venue, their commentary is most often added after play is complete when they have the opportunity to view the hole-cam video.

Prior to the invention of the hole-card camera, the audience had no way of knowing what the players were holding during any given hand of a poker broadcast unless players chose to show their cards or were all in.

Some televised tournaments also have a camera in the dealer's position to record the turn and river cards when a player wins the pot on the flop or turn. The viewers get to see what would have happened had there been a call, adding an extra element of drama. The players commonly call this the rabbit cam, although different poker shows use their own names for marketing purposes. The name derives from the poker term rabbit hunting, which means to look at the next few cards after a hand is over. Rabbit hunting is generally against tournament rules, partially because it gives away information. Consequently, this extra camera is used so the dealer can show the camera only and not the players at the table.

Henry Orenstein was granted a patent by the United States Patent and Trademark Office for the under-the-table hole-card camera on September 19, 1995.
