= Helen Chamberlain =

English television presenter

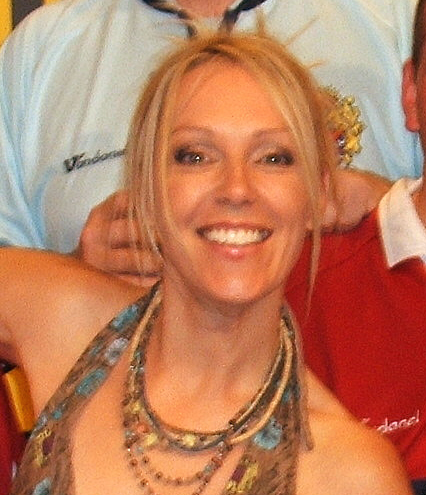
- Chamberlain in 2007
- Born: Helen Marie Chamberlain; 2 April 1967 (age 59); Street, Somerset, England
- Education: Crispin School, Street
- Occupation: Television presenter

Helen Marie Chamberlain (born 2 April 1967) is an English television presenter, best known for presenting Soccer AM on Sky Sports for 22 years. She previously worked as a holiday camp entertainer.

== Biography ==
Chamberlain was born in Street, Somerset. She worked as a Bluecoat at Pontins holiday camp and an announcer at Chessington World of Adventures, before becoming a club disc jockey.

She was discovered at Chessington by a producer for Nickelodeon, where she began presenting in 1994. She began presenting on Sky Sports's Saturday morning show Soccer AM in 1995. She also guest presented on two former Channel 4 breakfast shows – The Big Breakfast (alongside Johnny Vaughan) and RI:SE – and was a presenter for Sky TV's dedicated Poker channel Sky Poker. She also co-hosted on Channel 5's late night sports programme Live and Dangerous during 1997.

She appeared in a photo shoot for the May 2004 edition of Penthouse. She also modelled in underwear for Euro 2004 in Trafalgar Square.

Chamberlain left Soccer AM in August 2017, shortly before the start of the programme's 23rd season on air.

After leaving Soccer AM, Chamberlain took a step back from TV to work on her farm, although in 2018 she appeared on Celebrity Catchphrase and from 2022 to 2023, she hosted the World Seniors Darts Championship for TNT Sports.

== Sports ==
A pub-league level darts player when she was younger, Chamberlain claims to have once beaten Eric Bristow in a game of darts-cricket.

Chamberlain finished second in the 2005 Poker Million tournament winning $400,000. She spent her winnings on buying a Range Rover for her boyfriend, and the racehorse Birkspiel. The horse was trained by Simon Dow at Clear Height Stables in Epsom. On his first outing for the presenter, in April 2006, he won a €50,000 Group 3 race in Baden-Baden, Germany. One month later, he finished third in a Group 2 race in Cologne, Germany. She owned the flat racer Napoletano, and also co-owned sprinter Merlin's Dancer who finished second in The Dash which is the race before The Derby, in 2008. All three horses have now retired.

Chamberlain is a Torquay United fan.

== Personal life ==
Chamberlain is a teetotaler and vegetarian.
