= Ed Giddins =

English cricketer (born 1971)

Personal information
- Full name: Edward Simon Hunter Giddins
- Born: 20 July 1971 (age 55); Eastbourne, Sussex, England
- Nickname: Geezer
- Height: 6 ft 4 in (1.93 m)
- Batting: Right-handed
- Bowling: Right arm fast-medium

International information
- National side: England
- Test debut (cap 596): 19 August 1999 v New Zealand
- Last Test: 17 June 2000 v West Indies

Domestic team information
- Years: Team
- 1991–1996: Sussex
- 1998–2000: Warwickshire
- 2001–2002: Surrey
- 2003: Hampshire

Career statistics
Competition	Test	FC	LA	T20
Matches	4	147	192	5
Runs scored	10	534	107	1
Batting average	2.50	5.28	2.74	0.50
100s/50s	0/0	0/0	0/0	0/0
Top score	7	34	13*	1
Balls bowled	444	25,376	8,887	66
Wickets	12	478	229	2
Bowling average	20.00	28.37	28.31	54.50
5 wickets in innings	1	22	2	0
10 wickets in match	0	2	0	0
Best bowling	5/15	6/47	5/20	1/19
Catches/stumpings	0/–	22/–	36/–	0/–
- Source: Cricinfo, 31 July 2009

Edward Simon Hunter Giddins (born 20 July 1971) is a former English cricketer who played in four Tests from 1999 to 2000.

Giddins was born in Eastbourne, Sussex, Giddins was educated at St. Bedes Preparatory School in Eastbourne where he first showed his talent for cricket whilst playing for the school team. Giddins played for four counties during his career – Sussex, Warwickshire, Surrey and Hampshire. He was banned from cricket for 18 months and dropped by Sussex after testing positive for cocaine in 1996.

== International career ==
=== New Zealand ===
Giddins made his international debut against New Zealand at the Oval in August 1999, taking four wickets for 79 runs. Giddins' first Test match dismissal was former-Warwickshire batsman Roger Twose. New Zealand won this Test by 83 runs to clinch the four-game series 2–1.

=== Zimbabwe ===
Giddins was not selected for the winter tour of South Africa, but was back in the side for the two tests in England against Zimbabwe the following summer. England won the two-game series 1–0 and much of this is down to Giddins whose career best international figures of 5–15 in the first Zimbabwe innings helped swing the match in England's favour. Giddins also took two wickets in the second innings as well as scoring his highest score for England.

The second Test finished as a draw, with Giddins getting figures of 1–46 and being the not out batsman in both England innings.

=== West Indies ===
Giddins was named in the team to face West Indies in the opening game the five match series of 2000. England lost this game by an innings and 93 runs and Giddins' figures of 0–73, as well as his only international pair, meant he was subsequently dropped from the side. This was to be his last appearance for the national side.

== Controversies ==
In 1996 Giddins tested positive for the cocaine after Sussex's championship match against Kent at Tunbridge Wells at the end of May, and a second test on the sample also proved positive. The discipline committee of the Test and County Cricket Board rejected Giddins's story that he had taken cocaine by mistake and banned him for 20 months for "[bringing] the game into disrepute".

In 2004 Giddins was again banned for placing a bet in 2002 against Surrey, his county at the time, in a National League game against Northamptonshire. He pleaded not guilty but was given a 5-year ban from cricket.
