= John McCririck =

English horse racing pundit (1940–2019)

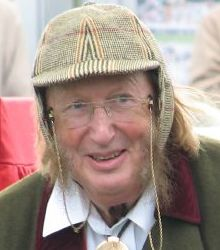
- McCririck in 2006
- Born: John Michael McCririck; 17 April 1940; Surbiton, Surrey, England
- Died: 5 July 2019 (aged 79); Marylebone, London, England
- Occupations: Horse racing pundit; journalist; television personality
- Years active: 1978–2019
- Spouse: Jenny McCririck (m. 1971)

John Michael McCririck (17 April 1940 – 5 July 2019) was an English horse racing pundit, television personality and journalist.

McCririck began his career at The Sporting Life, where he twice won at the British Press Awards for his campaigning journalism, but his role was terminated in 1984. In 1981, he joined ITV Sport's horse racing coverage which moved, during 1984 and 1985, to Channel 4 as Channel 4 Racing. In October 2012, the channel announced that he would be dropped from its team, which McCririck blamed on ageism; he took the matter to an employment tribunal, but lost the case.

From the 1980s, McCririck appeared as a contestant on numerous television shows, including Bullseye, You Bet!, Celebrity Big Brother, The Weakest Link, Wife Swap and Celebrity Poker Club. He also appeared on the current affairs discussion programme After Dark.

== Early life ==
Born in Surbiton, Surrey, to property-developer parents, McCririck was educated at Elizabeth College, Guernsey, Victoria College, Jersey, and Harrow School, where his fellow pupils included Julian Wilson, later a fellow racing journalist. He left with three O-Levels, having also run the book on cross country races.

== Career ==
After failing to get into the diplomatic service, McCririck was briefly a waiter at The Dorchester hotel. During the era when off-course betting was illegal in the UK, he worked for an illegal bookmaker, before becoming a bookmaker himself, at which he admitted to having failed. He then became a tic-tac man.

He began his career in journalism at The Sporting Life, where he twice won at the British Press Awards for his campaigning journalism; he was sacked in 1984. He joined the Daily Star, but was later sacked by the newspaper after allegations emerged that he was in debt to his bookmaker; he later successfully sued the paper at an employment tribunal.

Having previously become a results sub-editor on the BBC's Grandstand, from 1981 he joined ITV Sport's horse racing coverage; he had previously appeared in a debate about fox hunting on the ITV children's programme Saturday Banana in 1978. During 1984 and 1985, horse racing moved from ITV to Channel 4 as Channel 4 Racing, where his role was expanded and he reported from the betting ring. His signature flamboyant attire of a large deerstalker hat, sideburns, and brightly coloured matching suits and trousers, coupled with huge cigars, became a recognisable personal style.

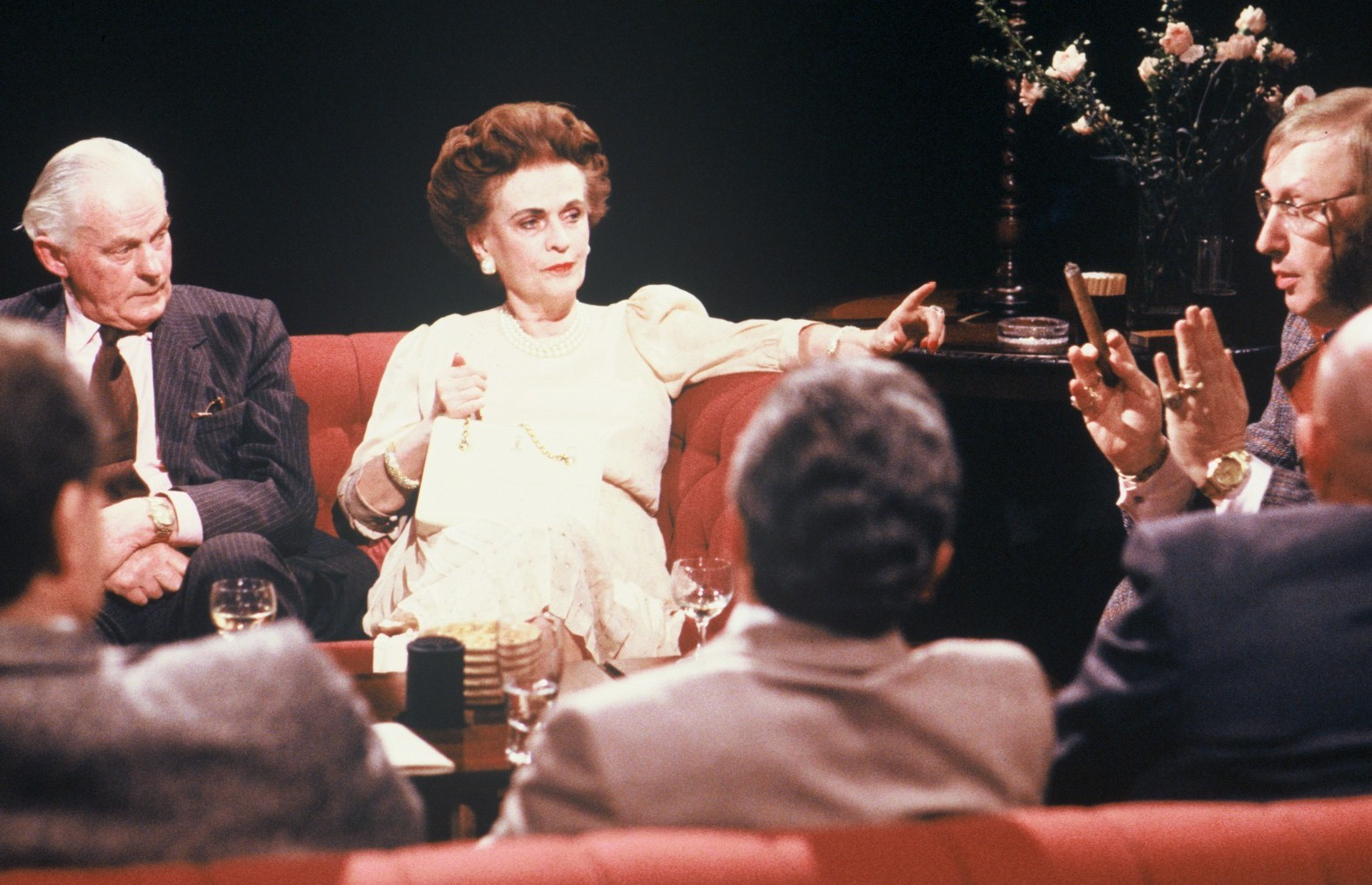
McCririck (far right), with trademark cigar, on Channel 4's After Dark on 9 April 1988

In 1988, on the evening after the Grand National, he made an extended appearance on the After Dark topical discussion programme on Channel 4, alongside Barney Curley and the Duchess of Argyll, in an episode entitled "Horse Racing, Sport Of Kings?"

In October 2012 Channel 4 announced that McCririck would not be included in the team presenting racing from January 2013, which McCririck blamed on ageism, taking Channel 4 to an employment tribunal. On 13 November the tribunal ruled against McCririck saying, "All the evidence is that Mr McCririck's pantomime persona, as demonstrated on the celebrity television appearances, and his persona when appearing on Channel 4 Racing, together with his self-described bigoted and male chauvinist views were clearly unpalatable to a wider audience." The panel was told by witnesses from the television station and IMG (the production company) that he was dropped because he was "offensive" and "disgusting".

In December 2018, McCririck joined the editorial team at The Racing Paper as a weekly columnist.

== Other media appearances ==
McCririck appeared on the 1991 Bullseye Christmas Special, winning the top prize for his chosen charity, the Sue Ryder Foundation. He also appeared in the Celebrity Poker Club television series, reaching the Grand Finale of series one, won by Sir Clive Sinclair. McCririck also appeared during ITV's snooker coverage in a betting capacity.

In March 1994, he appeared on the BBC One TV show Noel's House Party, receiving a Gotcha trophy.

In 1997, McCririck was tricked by two separate episodes of spoof TV show Brass Eye, once in an item about artificial insemination and another in an item, appearing as himself, about Yorkshire Ripper Peter Sutcliffe starring in a musical while on day-release from prison.

In January 2005, he was a contestant in the third series of Celebrity Big Brother. He competed on The Weakest Link. In April 2005, McCririck appeared on an episode of Hell's Kitchen (series 3, episode 8) in which Head Chef Marco Pierre White refused to serve him after McCririck told him that his consommé was 'greasy', in spite of being informed that it contained foie gras and truffle oil. White commented after the sequence, "I know John. He's awkward, he's got no taste. All you have to do is look at how he dresses."

In 2006, he appeared in the episode Drama on the show Still Game, playing himself on Channel 4 Racing telling Winston Ingram which horse to back. McCririck was a housemate in Ultimate Big Brother in August 2010.

In 2011, he was featured in the fourth episode of the British version of Celebrity Ghost Stories recounting his experiences of a haunted passageway at Harrow School.

On 26 June 2015, on the sixteenth series of Big Brother, it was announced that McCririck would be returning to Big Brother, taking part in Big Brother's Hotel from Hell the following week, where he would be staying in the house and other ex-housemates would join him on Monday 29 June.

== Personal life ==
McCririck married Jennifer Barnes in 1971 and referred to her as "The Booby". He was accused of frequent misogyny. In 2006, the couple took part in Wife Swap alongside Edwina Currie and her husband. McCririck was also a well-known supporter of Newcastle United.

In early 2018, McCririck contracted influenza which resulted in a chest infection. The illness caused him to suffer dramatic weight loss.

== Death ==
McCririck died at The Princess Grace Hospital, London, on 5 July 2019, after a short illness with lung cancer; he was 79.

Writing in The Guardian on the day McCririck died, racing correspondent Chris Cook said: “He was outrageous, in both speech and appearance, because what he wanted most of all was a reaction and so he enlivened many a broadcast or social occasion that might otherwise have fallen rather flat... While McCririck thrived on the attention his persona brought him, the buffoon act sold him short. He was a skilled journalist whose investigations uncovered a couple of betting-related scandals in the 70s. The producers of Channel 4 Racing almost invariably turned to McCririck when there was a serious interview to be done.”

On 12 July 2019 McCririck was featured in the BBC Radio 4 obituary programme Last Word.

== See also ==
- Horse racing in Great Britain
