= Matthew Hilger =

American poker player and author

- Nickname: None

World Series of Poker
- Bracelet: None
- Money finishes: 10
- Highest WSOP Main Event finish: 33rd, 2004

World Poker Tour
- Title: None
- Final table: None
- Money finish: 1

Matthew Hilger is an American professional poker player and author from Atlanta, Georgia. He also operates his own poker-related website.

== Early years ==
Prior to poker, Hilger graduated from University of Georgia with a Bachelor's degree in Finance (1989) and a Master's degree from Georgia State University in Finance in(1991). He received a second Master's in International business from Thunderbird School of Global Management (1996), then worked for Accenture (then Andersen Consulting) in numerous positions.

== Poker career ==
Hilger became an online poker professional during 2001 and made over $100,000 playing online in his first year, playing limit poker from $1/$2 to $30/$60. At the time he wrote his first book, he had played over 7,000 hours of online poker.

His writings include:

- Internet Texas Hold 'em: Winning Strategies from an Internet Pro (ISBN 0-9741502-0-7)
- Texas Hold 'em Odds and Probabilities: Limit, No-limit and Tournament Strategies (ISBN 0-9741502-2-3)
- The Poker Mindset: Essential Attitudes for Poker Success (with Ian Taylor) (ISBN 0-9741502-3-1)
- Card Player Magazine (numerous articles)
- The Hendon Mob website (numerous articles)

Hilger won the 2002 New Zealand Poker Championship and went on to finish in the money in the World Series of Poker (WSOP) $10,000 no limit Texas hold 'em Main Event in 2004 (33rd,) 2005 (332nd) and 2007 (221st.)

On Sunday, May 4, 2008, he won the Full Tilt Poker 750k guaranteed for $132,788 beating a 3,600+ player field.

As of 2009, his total live tournament winnings exceed $270,000.

Hilger has recently stopped being a professional poker and now works an office job at PokerStars on the Isle of Man.

== Personal life ==
Outside of poker, Hilger enjoys composing music on the piano. He is also a big supporter of the Colombian children's charity COLOMBIANITOS, having served on the board of directors until 2009.
