= Simon Trumper =

English poker player (born 1963)

- Nickname: Aces
- Born: 31 May 1963 (age 63)

World Series of Poker
- Bracelet: None
- Money finishes: 3
- Highest WSOP Main Event finish: None

Simon Trumper (born 31 May 1963) is an English professional poker player from South Kensington, London, England. He is chiefly noted as the winner of Late Night Poker series 2 and runner-up of series 4. Trumper also commentated on the Late Night Poker Ace spin-off series alongside Jesse May.

As a child, Trumper was expelled from secondary school for playing poker dice after finishing a mathematics exam. He started playing in 1995, when he entered a £10 tournament in Reading with a friend on a night out. He was also bullied a lot due to his surname 'Trumper'.

At the World Series of Poker, he has had a 4th-place finish in the 2002 $3,000 No Limit Hold-Em event, which also featured Johnny Chan and Kathy Liebert, and a 4th-place finish in the 2005 $10,000 Pot Limit Omaha event, which also featured Todd Brunson, Barry Greenstein (who lost a critical pot to Simon and then complained about it in his blog), Erik Seidel, and Julian "The Kid" Gardner. He has not yet featured in the World Poker Tour.

In May 2005, he reached the fourth round of the €2,000 World Heads-Up Championship, earning €3,250.

Trumper keeps a pair of gold and diamond aces as a good-luck charm. Among poker players, he most admires Dave "The Devilfish" Ulliott, T. J. Cloutier, and Erik Seidel.

He is a non-smoker, and would like to see smoking banned from all poker games. Trumper suffers from the hair loss condition, Alopecia.

As of 2023, he has had consistent success in events around the world and his total live tournament winnings exceed $1,600,000.
