= Lucy Rokach =

English poker player

- Nickname: Golden Ovaries
- Born: Lucienne Rokach; Cairo, Egypt

World Series of Poker
- Bracelet: None
- Money finishes: 6
- Highest WSOP Main Event finish: 26th, 1996

Lucienne "Lucy" Rokach is an English professional poker player from Stoke-on-Trent. She was born in Cairo, Egypt and is now regarded as one of the top female players in Europe. She also commentated on the popular Late Night Poker television series with Jesse May during its fourth season, and had a 3rd-place finish in the series 6 grand final (the highest-ever finish for a female player in a Late Night Poker grand final.)

She won the 2003 European Poker Top award for Lifetime Achievement after winning the Winter Festival in Dublin in both 2001 and 2003. Rokach cashed in the World Series of Poker $10,000 no limit hold'em main event in 1996 and 2004.

Rokach also commentates on The Poker Channel, alongside Gary "The Choirboy" Jones and Roy "The Boy" Brindley.

In his book Ace on The River, Barry Greenstein says he considers Lucy the best female no-limit hold 'em player in the world.

As of 2009, her total live tournament winnings exceed $1,200,000.
