= Julian Gardner (poker player) =

English poker player

- Nicknames: The Kid, The Wriggler

World Series of Poker
- Bracelet: None
- Money finishes: 14
- Highest WSOP Main Event finish: 2nd, 2002

European Poker Tour
- Title: None
- Final table: None
- Money finishes: 2

Julian Gardner is a poker player from Manchester, England.

Gardner is a second-generation professional, following in the footsteps of his father Dave. He started going to a local casino at the age of 15. By the time he was 20 he had won 10 tournaments. By 21, he had made 25 final tables.

In 2000 he entered the World Series of Poker (WSOP) main event for the first time. He tripled up within two hours to become the early chip leader. However, he was unable to make it through that day. Gardner was unable to attend the tournament in 2001.

At the age of 24, he finished second in the main event of the 2002 World Series of Poker, becoming the youngest player ever to win $1 million in a poker tournament. Gardner also finished in the money at the main event in 2003 and 2004, making him the only player to finish in the money in 2002, 2003 and 2004. He qualified for the 2005 WSOP on the website Betfair. Although he did not make it into the money in the 2005 Main Event, he made 4 money finishes in other events, including the $5,000 No Limit Hold-Em tournament won by T. J. Cloutier and the $1,500 Pot Limit Omaha tournament won by Barry Greenstein. Gardner also cashed in the 2007 main event coming in 64th place for $130,288.

Gardner also made appearances on the Late Night Poker television series. He was also a member of the winning British team in the Poker Nations Cup. He is the co-author of the book The Secrets of Online Power Poker.

As of 2015, his total live tournament winnings exceed $2,400,000. His 14 cashes at the WSOP account for $1,688,876 of those winnings. He finished 3rd at the final table at Poker Million VI winning his biggest prize since the 2002 WSOP, $250,000.

Gardner is engaged to poker player Kerry "Pint Size" Clarke. They both reached the semi-final of the 2005 888.com UK Poker Open, where Gardner eliminated her.
