= Poker Million =

European poker tournament

The Poker Million has been a televised European poker tournament since its inception in November 2000. The final debuted to 30 million viewers and has since remained popular. It was created by UK gaming outfit Ladbrokes with the help of sports promotion firm Matchroom Sport. In 2009 sponsorship was transferred from Ladbrokes to Full Tilt Poker, which produced Poker Million VIII.

== Format ==
The Poker Million is a no-limit Texas holdem “shootout” tournament. Shootout tournaments differ from standard tournaments in that starting tables do not rebalance as players are eliminated. Instead, each starting table is an independent “heat” which plays down to one player, who then advances to the next round.

The exact format for The Poker Million has changed with sponsorship over the years, but typically involves a starting field of 72 players in 12 heats. The winners of each heat advance to one of two semi-final tables. The semi-final tables play down to three players, and then combine to form the final table.

== History ==
Poker Million I was sponsored by Ladbrokes and Matchroom Sport and took place at the Hilton Hotel on the Isle of Man in November, 2000. Coverage of the final table drew 30 million viewers. John Duthie, who later created the European Poker Tour, defeated Teddy Tuli with a full house on the final hand to win the first place prize of £1 million.

The tournament returned in 2003 with Poker Million II. Snooker-player Jimmy White won $150,000 for first place at a final table featuring heart rate monitors and exposed hole cards.

The field for Poker Million III was expanded to feature 72 players, including 36 online qualifiers and number of celebrities. Among the celebrities were snooker stars Stephen Hendry, Mark Williams and 2003 winner Jimmy White; rugby World Cup star Mike Tindall; and, sports celebrities Tony Cascarino and 16 time World Darts Champion Phil Taylor. Irish poker professional Donnacha O'Dea won first place and $300,000.

Ladbrokes guaranteed a $1 million first place prize for Poker Million IV. Freeroll qualifier Tony Jones outlasted 66 fellow online qualifiers, eventually defeating television celebrity Helen Chamberlain heads up to claim the million dollar prize.

Northampton, UK resident Rajesh “foggy71” Modha won Poker Million V after qualifying in a $9 satellite. He overcame a final table draw that seated two-time bracelet winner and chip leader Mel Judah to his left, earning $1.2 million for the effort.

Joe Beevers won Poker Million VI when his pocket nines held up against Marty Smyth’s King high. It was the second consecutive year Smyth was eliminated at the final table of the Poker Million.

Smyth returned in 2008 to win the Poker Million VII for $1 million, after being reduced to one set of blinds on the third hand at the final table.

James Akenhead won the 2009 Poker Million VIII, held in London on December 4. Akenhead entered heads up play at a slight chip disadvantage to Juha Helppi. Akenhead eventually gained the chip lead and went all-in pre-flop with pocket tens to Juha Helppi’s pocket 6s. Akenhead earned $500,000 for 1st, and Helppi $250,000 for 2nd.

Gus Hansen won the 2010 Poker Million IX on December 10, defeating Tony Bloom heads up to win the $1,000,000 winner takes all prize from a final table of 8.

== Results ==
Date	Winner	Prize	Other Finalists
16-Nov-2000	John Duthie	£1,000,000	Teddy Tuil; Ian Dobson; Tony Bloom; Gary Lent; Barny Boatman
14-Mar-2003	Jimmy White	$150,000	Joe Beevers; Tony Bloom; Steve Davis; Guy Bowles
09-Jul-2004	Donnacha O'Dea	$300,000	Dave Ulliott; Zac Goldsmith; Nicholas Barbu; Frederick Richardson; Jon Backman
19-Aug-2005	Tony Jones	$1,000,000	Helen Chamberlain; Martin Wendt; David Lerner; Donnacha O'Dea; Bengt Sonnert
15-Dec-2006	Rajesh Modha	$1,200,000	Claus Marcussen; Andreas Høivold; Mel Judah; Mats Jungsand; Marty Smyth
21-Dec-2007	Joe Beevers	$1,000,000	Marty Smyth; Julian Gardner; Liam Flood; Howard Lederer; Ian Cox
12-Dec-2008	Marty Smyth	$1,000,000	Eoghan O'Dea; Ciaran O'Leary; Liam Flood; Kevin Allen; Svein Neilsen
4-Dec-2009	James Akenhead	$500,000	Juha Helppi; Dag Martin Mikkelsen; Luke Schwartz; Craig Wakeham; Peter Vasiliou; Taylor Caby
10-Dec-2010	Gus Hansen	$1,000,000	Tony Bloom; James Bord; Barny Boatman; Gary Peniket; Seth Webber; Howard Lederer; Patrik Antonius
