= Tony Bloom =

British gambler, poker player and entrepreneur (born 1970)

Tony Bloom MBE
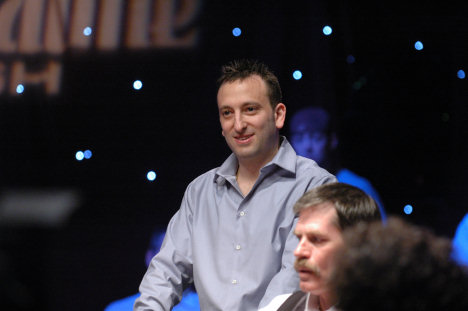
- Bloom in 2005
- Born: Anthony Grant Bloom; 20 March 1970 (age 56); Brighton, England
- Education: University of Manchester (BSc)
- Occupations: sports gambler; sports administrator; poker player; businessman
- Known for: Majority owner and chairman of Brighton and Hove Albion F.C.
- Nickname: The Lizard

World Series of Poker
- Money finishes: 11
- Highest WSOP Main Event finish: 512th, 2006

World Poker Tour
- Final table: 1
- Money finishes: 2

European Poker Tour
- Money finish: 1

Anthony Grant Bloom MBE (born 20 March 1970) is an English sports gambler, entrepreneur, and poker player. Bloom has stakes in multiple football clubs; he is the majority owner and chairman of Premier League football club Brighton & Hove Albion, and investor and minority shareholder in Belgian First Division A team Royale Union Saint-Gilloise. He is also a minority owner of Australian A-League club Melbourne Victory and Scottish Premiership club Heart of Midlothian.

== Early life and career ==
Bloom grew up in Brighton. He attended the fee-paying school Lancing College before gaining a degree in mathematics at the University of Manchester. After graduating, Bloom worked for the accountancy firm Ernst & Young for around two years, then spent six months as an options trader before deciding to gamble professionally.

== Sports betting ==
Bloom was hired by bookmakers Victor Chandler in the late 1990s to set up its international gambling business in Bangkok, which introduced him to the Asian market, and its handicap system of betting.

He founded an online football betting company, Premierbet, before the 2022 World Cup, and later sold it for £1 million. He also launched and sold on-line gambling companies Tribeca Tables and St Minver.

Bloom heads a private betting syndicate, run through his company Starlizard, based in Camden in north London, which is believed to have been continuously successful year on year for a sustained period. Jamestown Analytics, founded in 2017, is an offshoot of Starlizard. It provides data on players and coaches to football and cricket clubs.

Bloom also holds significant property and private equity portfolios.

== Football club ownership ==
=== Brighton & Hove Albion ===
Since 2009, Bloom has been the chairman of English club Brighton & Hove Albion. Bloom is a longtime Brighton fan and his family has had a long association with the club; his uncle, Ray, is a director and his grandfather, Harry, was vice-chairman during the 1970s. The club was promoted to the Premier League in the 2016–17 season after 34 years out of the top flight of English football.

Bloom succeeded Dick Knight after securing a 75% shareholding in the club, and invested £93 million in the development of the club's new ground, Falmer Stadium.

Brighton were promoted from Football League One as champions in 2011, the season before Brighton moved into Falmer Stadium. Brighton avoided relegation in 2014–15, and then finished in third place in the Championship the following season. In the 2016–17 season Brighton finished second in the Championship, gaining promotion to the Premier League for the first time. The club broke several transfer fee records to improve the squad in the following transfer window.

In the 2021–22 Premier League season, Brighton finished with 51 points, their highest ever points tally in the Premier League, and finished in 9th place. Brighton then finished the 2022–23 Premier League season in 6th place, qualifying for the UEFA Europa League and hosting European football for the first time.

=== Heart of Midlothian ===
In June 2025, Bloom invested £10m into Heart of Midlothian for which he has received a 29% stake in the club in non-voting shares. In May 2026, Uefa announced that they were scrutinising the relationship between Hearts and Brighton and Hove Albion because of Bloom's connection to the clubs. Both clubs were on course to qualify for the Europa League.

=== Union Saint-Gilloise ===
In 2018, Bloom completed the takeover of Belgian second division club Royale Union Saint-Gilloise, known as USG. At the end of the 2020–21 football season USG were promoted to Belgian First Division A for the first time in 48 years. Bloom was the majority owner of USG however following the qualification by USG and Brighton for UEFA club competitions for the 2023–24 season, Bloom made changes to his investment in USG to ensure compliance with UEFA's multi-club ownership rules. These changes resulted in Bloom becoming a minority shareholder in USG. USG and Brighton's admission to UEFA club competitions for the 2023–24 season was confirmed by UEFA in a press release issued on 7 July 2023.

=== Melbourne Victory ===
In March 2025, Bloom bought a 19.1% stake in Australian A-League club Melbourne Victory.

== Poker ==
Bloom is a poker player, nicknamed "The Lizard".

Bloom appeared in the Late Night Poker television series and has a final table appearance on the World Poker Tour. He also made back-to-back final table appearances in the first two Poker Million events. His first major win came in January 2004 when he won the Australasian Poker Championship in Melbourne, collecting a first prize of around A$420,000 ($320,000, £180,000).

Bloom fell short of the million-pound grand prize in the Poker Million IX event held in London on 10 December 2010. He finished second behind Gus Hansen.

In September 2022, Bloom won Poker Masters Event #8: $25,000 Pot-Limit Omaha for $360,000. It was Bloom's first time playing poker in three years and his first time playing a PokerGO Tour event.

As of October 2022, Bloom's total live tournament winnings exceeded $3,800,000.

== Personal life ==
Bloom is married to Linda, an Australian-born psychologist. They have two children.

Bloom, who is Jewish, has played a key role in the development of a synagogue and community centre project in Hove. He became involved when the Brighton and Hove Hebrew Congregation faced financial difficulties, with funding for the project provided by the Bloom Foundation, where he serves as chairman.

Bloom was appointed Member of the Order of the British Empire (MBE) in the 2024 New Year Honours for services to association football and to the community in Brighton.
