= The Hendon Mob =

Group of professional poker players

The Hendon Mob are a group of four professional poker players from London, England: Joe Beevers, Barny Boatman, Ross Boatman, and Ram Vaswani.

The name of the group was first publicised by the Evening Standard newspaper in September 2000. Joe Beevers is the only member of the group who actually comes from Hendon, but the others played in Hendon.

The Mob first became recognised for their appearances on the televised poker programme Late Night Poker (1999–2002). The Hendon Mob also regularly attends the annual World Series of Poker and other major tournaments. They have dozens of in the money results between them. The Mob were used in series one of the British con-art documentary series 'The Real Hustle'. Presenters R. Paul Wilson and Alexis Conran, posing as poker novices filming a documentary, beat the Mob by smuggling in decks stacked to their advantage.

== Sponsorship ==
In 2004 and 2005, the Mob was sponsored by Prima Poker to the tune of $2 million worth of worldwide tournament buy-in fees. In exchange they played on the online Prima poker-room network. As part of the tour, the Mob challenged four-player teams of various nationalities to heads-up matches, culminating with the UK versus the U.S. in the inaugural Prima Transatlantic Cup in 2004. The Mob had won each of these international team matches until falling 3–1 to the US team of Phil Ivey, Andy Bloch, Chris Ferguson, and Paul Wolfe. The Mob's deal with Prima expired at the end of 2005.

The Mob were then sponsored by Full Tilt Poker until September 2011, when the online poker site was accused of fraud. The deal was reinstated when Full Tilt Poker reached an agreement with the U.S Department of Justice.

== Other ventures ==
The Hendon Mob is also a website that includes the biggest poker player database worldwide, that collects the results of every poker tournament in the world since 2000, indexed by location, date, and player. The origin of the information contained in the database was queried in a court action brought by rival website Pokerpages.com, and information sourced from Pokerpages.com has since been removed from the database. In July 2013 the Mob's website was acquired by the Global poker index.
