= Dave Colclough =

Welsh gambler (1964–2016)

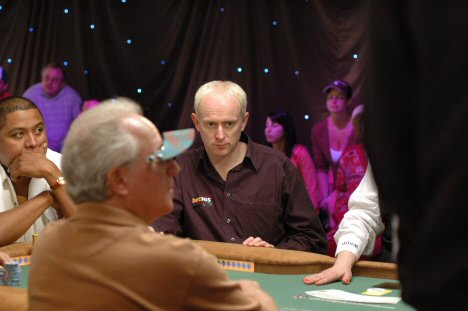
- Nickname: El Blondie
- Born: 4 March 1964; Carmarthen, Wales
- Died: 18 October 2016 (aged 52)

World Series of Poker
- Bracelet: None
- Money finishes: 17
- Highest WSOP Main Event finish: 427th, 2008

World Poker Tour
- Title: None
- Final table: 1
- Money finishes: 2

European Poker Tour
- Title: None
- Final table: None
- Money finish: 1

David E. Colclough (4 March 1964 – 18 October 2016) was a Welsh professional poker player.

== Early life ==
Colclough was born in Carmarthen. Prior to becoming a poker professional, he worked in computing. He left computing after the 2000 World Series of Poker.

== Poker career ==
His tournament results include a second at the 2000 World Series of Poker $2,000 In 2005, he reached the semi-finals of the World Heads-Up Poker Championship, earning €20,000. In 2003, he was voted European Poker Player of the Year.

His total live poker tournament winnings exceeded $2,600,000.

== Death ==
He returned from the Philippines to England in 2016 to seek medical care. He died on 18 October 2016, aged 52, suffering from cancer.
