= Liam Flood =

Irish bookmaker and poker player (c. 1943 – 2014)

- Nickname: The Gentleman
- Born: c. 1943
- Died: 16 August 2014 (aged 71)

World Series of Poker
- Bracelet: None
- Money finishes: 2
- Highest WSOP Main Event finish: None

Liam Flood (c. 1943 – 16 August 2014) was an Irish bookmaker and professional poker player who was the 1997 European poker champion.

== Poker career ==
Flood began playing poker tournaments in the 1980s in Ireland. He won the Irish Poker Open in 1990 and 1996, becoming one of only four players to have won that tournament multiple times. He was a close friend of Terry Rogers, a fellow bookmaker who created the Irish Poker Open tournament, and has run the tournament since Rogers died in 1999.

He was a finalist in series 1 and 2 of the Late Night Poker television series and went on to be the floorman for the Celebrity Poker Club spin-off. In 1997, he had an 11th-place finish in the pot-limit hold-em tournament at the World Series of Poker. In 1998, he had a 15th-place finish in the no-limit hold-em tournament at the World Series.

His biggest cash win to date is a second-place finish at the Party Poker World Open in Maidstone, Kent, England on 3 April 2005. He won $150,000. Flood also appeared in the 2005 World Speed Poker Open. His total lifetime professional tournament winnings exceeded $1,100,000.

In 2007, Flood won the Party Poker European Open, beating Darren Hickman in the final head-to-head and pocketing the first prize of $125,000. This was his first outright win in a televised tournament.

On 16 August 2014, Flood died at the age of 71.
