= Padraig Parkinson =

Irish poker player (born 1957)

- Born: June 25, 1940 (age 86); Galway, Ireland

World Series of Poker
- Money finishes: 8
- Highest WSOP Main Event finish: 3rd, 1999

World Poker Tour
- Final table: None
- Money finishes: 6

European Poker Tour
- Money finish: 1

Padraig Parkinson (born 1957 in Galway) is an Irish poker player. He is chiefly recognised as the grand final winner of Late Night Poker series 5 (where he defeated Korosh Nejad) and as the third-place finisher of the 1999 World Series of Poker, where he lost to fellow countryman Noel Furlong.

Originally, Parkinson refused to play in Late Night Poker, as he did not wish to have his cards shown to the audience. His mood changed when money was added to the prize pool, and sponsorship also became a factor. In his heat, he was actually the favourite with 2/1 odds against series 3 champion Phil Hellmuth's 5/2 odds. Despite this, Parkinson bet on Ken Lennaárd (who finished 2nd) at 6/1. Despite the fact that Hellmuth admitted he could see Parkinson's cards during the heat, Parkinson went on to win.

Parkinson still plays numerous tournaments and has money finishes in both the World Poker Tour and European Poker Tour. In December 2009, he was the winner of the inaugural event of the United Kingdom & Ireland Poker Tour in his home town of Galway for €125,000. He also finds time to commentate on poker events including the Poker Nations Cup and the PartyPoker.com Football & Poker Legends Cup. He has been voted into the Irish Hall Of Fame, having captained Ireland to victory in Poker Nations Cup (Europe) and in 2013, he won a WPT PLO event in Paris winning nearly €77,000 at the now-defunct Aviation Club de Paris.

As of 2019, his total live tournament winnings are $1,870,474. His 17 cashes at the WSOP account for $882,460 of those winnings.
