= Nic Szeremeta =

English/Polish poker player (1943–2021)

- Born: June 1943
- Died: 25 January 2021 (aged 77)

European Poker Tour
- Money finish: 1

Nic Szeremeta (1943 – 25 January 2021) was a poker player of English and Polish descent, the publisher of Poker Europa magazine, and creator of the Late Night Poker television series (and commentator with Jesse May during its first three series).

== Early life ==
Szeremeta's father, who used to play draw poker himself, was a rear gunner who went missing during World War II. Nic was brought up by his mother in Letchworth Garden City in Hertfordshire in the post-war years.

He began playing poker in 1962 during college, where he ran a game from his room. He was eventually asked to leave due to a French au pair being found in his bed.

== Career ==
He formed his own newspaper "The Weekender" in Torbay and magazine publishing group in 1980/81 and sold it in 1989.

At the age of 47, he found it difficult to get work, so he bought a betting office. It lost money despite a reasonable turnover, yet was sold at a profit.

In 1995, he was made secretary of the European Poker Players' Association. He was permanently on the poker circuit until 1998 when he began editing Poker Europa magazine. In 1999 he created Late Night Poker and has been credited for contributing to the poker boom in the UK, although he eventually left the show due to a money dispute and disagreement about the show's direction.

He also helped create the World Heads-Up Poker Championship. Nic has played poker in over 10 countries to date. In his retirement years, one of his favourite destinations to play poker is Vienna where he achieved his most recent live cash.

Szeremeta was the Independent Newspaper's poker correspondent from 1999 to 2016.

His daughter Kate, a former piano teacher, also plays poker and appeared in the first "Late Night Poker" episode. He currently resides in the town of Torquay in the southwest of England.

Szeremeta was the first non-American to win the World Series of Poker Media Event in 1996. He is also a keen 7 card stud player and managed to win the Amsterdam Master's Classic (stud tournament) in 1995, which was his biggest live tournament cash ($18,046).

Szeremeta's most successful year in terms of poker came in 2006 where he cashed $51,901. As of 2019, his total live tournament winnings stood at $206,659.

== Personal life ==
Szeremeta died on 25 January 2021, aged 77.
