= Peter Costa (poker player) =

British poker player (born 1956)

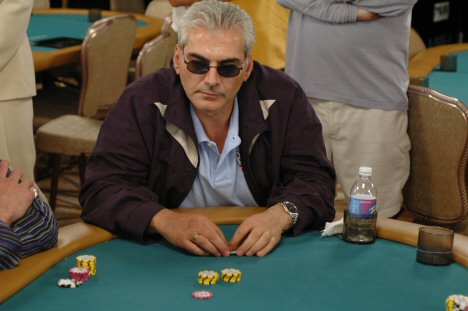
- Costa in the 2005 World Series of Poker
- Nicknames: The Poet; The Silver Fox
- Born: 27 January 1956 (age 70); Cyprus

World Series of Poker
- Money finishes: 11

World Poker Tour
- Final table: None
- Money finishes: 5

Peter Costa (born 27 January 1956, in Cyprus) to Greek Cypriot parents is a British professional poker player based in Las Vegas, Nevada.

He is known as the winner of the sixth series of the popular Late Night Poker television series during his time living in the United Kingdom, where he defeated Austria's Jin Cai Lin in the final heads-up encounter to take the £60,000 first prize. He was formerly nicknamed "The Silver Fox", a nickname shared by fellow poker player Mel Judah.

Costa has made four final tables at the World Series of Poker (WSOP):

- 2002 $2,000 limit Texas hold 'em – 9th place ($17,200)
- 2003 $2,500 seven-card stud – 9th place ($3,600)
- 2005 $1,500 limit Texas hold 'em – 7th place ($57,905)
- 2006 $3,000 Omaha hi/lo – 7th place ($38,861)

Costa was nominated for both the 2002 and 2003 European Poker Player of the Year awards. Costa won the Aussie Millions tournament in 2003, and, at one time, held the record for winning the limit hold-em tournament with the most entrants.

As of 2008, his total live tournament winnings exceed $1,700,000.

Costa's favourite movie is Groundhog Day, and he is a fan of James Stewart. His niece, Maria Demetriou, also has numerous poker results to her credit.
