= Late Night Poker =

British television series

- Starring: Jesse May; Nic Szeremeta; Barny Boatman; Lucy Rokach; Victoria Coren; Gary Jones; Richard Orford
- Country of origin: United Kingdom
- Original language: English
- No. of series: 10

Production
- Running time: 60–90 minutes
- Production company: Presentable

Original release
- Network: Channel 4
- Release: 17 July 1999 – 6 December 2011

Late Night Poker is a British television series that helped popularize poker in the 2000s. It used "under the table" cameras that enabled the viewer to see each player's cards.

The show originally ran for six series between 1999 and 2002. After a couple of spin-off series, Late Night Poker Ace and Late Night Poker Masters, it returned in 2008.

== Late Night Poker 2011 ==
The series returned to Channel 4 for its 10th series in 2011. Sponsored by Gala Coral Group, 32 players competed for the $150,000 first prize. Commentary on the series was provided by two of the UK's top poker professionals, Victoria Coren and James Akenhead.

Some of the top players in action were Luke Schwartz, Roberto Romanello, Vanessa Selbst, Jake Cody, James Bord and Liv Boeree. The field contained five former Late Night Poker champions, Dave Ulliott (also known as Devilfish), Simon Trumper, Padraig Parkinson, Peter Costa and John Duthie.

The series was broadcast on Tuesday nights after midnight from 3 October – 6 December 2011.

== History ==
In 1999, Channel 4 accepted a proposal from the Cardiff-based production company Presentable to create a poker tournament television series. At the time, poker had not been broadcast on UK television. The project became Late Night Poker.

The first series aired in July 1999 and quickly developed a steady following. The programme featured a low-lit studio setting and professional poker players competing at the table. The game format was No Limit Texas Hold'Em, which was relatively unfamiliar in the United Kingdom at the time.

The first series was won by Dave Ulliott who became the UK's first poker celebrity. Other players who became regulars on the series included Series 2 winner, Simon Trumper, Surinder Sunar, Liam Flood, Dave Colclough, Kourosh and the 4 players known collectively as the Hendon Mob, Joe Beevers, Barny Boatman, Ross Boatman and Ram Vaswani.

A celebrity version of the show was produced on 12 October 2000, featuring (in finishing order from 1st to 7th place) Anthony Holden, Al Alvarez, Martin Amis, Victoria Coren, Patrick Marber, Stephen Fry and Ricky Gervais. This led into the creation of spin-off series Celebrity Poker Club on Challenge in 2003.

Late Night Poker ran for six series from 1999 until 2002. A couple of spin-off series, Late Night Poker Ace and Late Night Poker Masters were aired between 2005 and 2007. In 2008, Late Night Poker returned for its 7th series and continued annually until 2011.

== Crew ==
An integral part of the series were the tournament referee and dealers. From the very start of Late Night Poker, experienced referee, Austrian Thomas Kremser has presided over the action. In the early series, he was accompanied by dealers Marina Kremser and Peter Schmid, and, later on, Stevie Pollak, who replaced Schmid.

The commentary on Late Night Poker has at times created as much interest as the action on the table. In the first few series, the commentators were Jesse May and Nic Szeremeta. Jesse actually appeared in the first series as a player under the pseudonym "Mickey Dane".

Other commentators in the series have included Barny Boatman, Lucy Rokach, Victoria Coren, Gary Jones and Richard Orford. For the 10th series, the commentators were Victoria Coren and James Akenhead.

== Format ==
In the 10th series, there were four heats of eight players with the players finishing 1st and 2nd in each heat qualifying for the final. The winners of each heat started the final with 50,000 in chips, while the runners-up started with 30,000 in chips. Each of the heats and final was shown across 2x 60-minute programmes – 10 programmes in total.

Most of the previous series of Late Night Poker consisted of 9 programmes – 7 heats, one semi-final, and the final. Each heat had seven players. The seven winners of the heats progressed straight to the final, and the runners-up went to the semi-final, where one additional player progresses, for a final table of 8 players.

(NB: The first series featured five heats, with the players finishing 1st and 2nd in each progressing to the final. The players who qualified by finishing first in their heat started the final with twice as many chips as the heat runners-up.)

Although the precise sums of money involved have varied, the typical buy-in has been in the region of £1,500, with a first prize of between £40,000 and £60,000. In recent years, the buy-in had considerably increased. In the 10th series, the buy-in was $10,000 creating a prize pot of $320,000 with the winner banking $150,000.

== Under-the-table cameras ==
Late Night Poker's success is largely attributable to its "under-the-table" cameras (later known as hole cams) which allowed the viewers and commentators to see the players' cards through the transparent table. It is doubtful poker could succeed as a spectator sport otherwise, but American broadcasters have subsequently used a similar technique in programmes such as World Poker Tour.

Nevertheless, in contrast to most Poker shows, in its early series, Late Night Poker tended to use these cameras in a rather minimalist way. For example, in a two-way pot, often only one player's cards were shown, with the commentators trying to infer from the other player's actions what cards he or she held, and how the first player should act. Because of this, the commentary often mirrored the actual decision-making process of a Poker player. Only late in the hand, at the time of a critical decision, would the other player's cards be shown, possibly revealing a startling bluff or an unexpectedly strong hand.

== Sponsors ==
The original 6 series of Late Night Poker did not have a sponsor. However, with the creation of online poker came online poker companies and sponsored players, by the mid 2000s, most TV poker shows were sponsored by one of these online companies.

The Late Night Poker spin-off series, Late Night Poker Ace and Late Night Poker Masters and Series 7 of Late Night Poker were sponsored by PartyPoker. Series 8 and 9 of Late Night Poker were sponsored by Full Tilt Poker. Series 10 was sponsored by Coral.

== Results ==
Season	Year	Winner	Prize	Runner-Up	3rd place
1	1999	(United Kingdom) Dave Ulliott	£40,000	Peter Evans	Dave Welch
2	2000	(United Kingdom) Simon Trumper	£40,000	Ross Boatman	Ram Vaswani
3	2000	(United States) Phil Hellmuth	£45,000	Adam Heller	Paul Alterman
4	2001	(United Kingdom) Hemish Shah	£50,000	Simon Trumper	Barny Boatman
5	2002	(Republic of Ireland) Padraig Parkinson	£50,000	Korosh Nejad	Joe Beevers
6	2002	(Cyprus) Peter Costa	£60,000	Jin Cai Lin	Lucy Rokach
Ace 1	2005	(United Kingdom) John Shaw	£50,000	Hung Luc	Miles Adam
Ace 2	2006	(Spain) Raul Mestre	$50,000	Simon Ehne	Michiel Van Woerden
Masters	2007	(United Kingdom) David Tighe	$100,000	Simon Ehne	Barny Boatman
7	2008	(Sweden) Andreas Jorbeck	$125,000	Roland De Wolfe	Andy Black
8	2009	(United States) Huck Seed	$200,000	Gus Hansen	Annette Obrestad
9	2010	(United Kingdom) John Duthie	$200,000	Phil Ivey	Carlos Mortensen
10	2011	(United Kingdom) Sam Holden	$150,000	Luke Schwartz	Rob Okell
