= List of Irish Poker Open winners =

This is a list of people who have won the Irish Poker Open, the oldest, longest-running and most prestigious poker tournament after the World Series of Poker.

Winners of the Irish Poker Open
Name	Year(s) won
Liam Barker	1999
Joe Beevers	2003
Griffin Benger	2017
Nick Bernie	2002
Alan Betson	2000
Tony Byrne	1984
Neil Channing	2008
Patrick Clarke	2014
Frank Conway	1982
David Docherty (poker player)	2023
Colette Doherty	1980 and 1991
Ivan Donaghy	2004
John Falconer	2005
Mickey Finn (poker player)	1994 and 1998
Liam Flood	1990 and 1996
Noel Furlong	1987 and 1989
Jenny Hegarty	2001
Christer Johansson	2009
Sean Kelly (poker player)	1981
Jimmy Langan	1983 and 1988
Ryan Mandara	2018
Bryan McCarthy	1986
Vincent Melinn	2006
James Mitchell (poker player)	2010
Steve O'Dwyer	2022
Pablo Silva (poker player)	2020
Ian Simpson (poker player)	2013
Christie Smith	1993
Marty Smyth	2007
Niall Smyth	2011
Irene Tier	1985
Ioannis Triantafyllakis	2015
Kevin Vandersmissen	2012
Pavel Veksler	2021
Dan Wilson (poker player)	2016
Weijie Zheng	2019
