= Crown Australian Poker Championship =

Series of poker tournaments

- Most recent season or competition: 2020
- Game: Texas Hold 'em
- Founded: 26 July 1998; 27 years ago
- Owner: Publishing and Broadcasting Limited
- Organizing body: Crown Casinos
- Country: Australia
- Most recent champion: (Australia) Vincent Wan
- Website: www.aussiemillions.com

The Australian Poker Championship, commonly known as Aussie Millions, is a series of poker tournaments held at the Crown Casino, in Melbourne, Australia. The Main Event of the series is the Southern Hemisphere's richest poker tournament with a prize pool in excess of A$7 million. After a 6 year long hiatus, Aussie Millions is back in 2026.

== History ==
Poker at Crown was introduced in June 1997, with the first major championship held shortly after in July 1998. The Main Event was a $1,000 buy in Limit Holdem tournament that attracted 74 entries with a $74,000 prize pool. The Crown Australian Poker Championship, or the 'Aussie Millions' as it became known, moved to January in 2001, attracting 40 entrants with a $5,000 buy in for a prize pool of $200,000. January 2003 saw the event go international, attracting a field of 122 entrants and a $1,200,000 prize pool. In January 2005, the Aussie Millions continued to grow with 263 participants paying $10,000 each to enter the No Limit Hold'em Main Event, generating the biggest prize pool ever in the Southern Hemisphere of $2,630,000. Over half the field was from overseas including players from New Zealand, England, Ireland, Norway, Denmark, the US, Sweden, the Netherlands, Canada, Italy and Lebanon. In 2006, 418 players competed for a share of the $4,180,000 prize pool, including some of the biggest names in the Poker world such as WSOP Champion Joe Hachem, along with Phil Ivey, John Juanda and Daniel Negreanu. The 2007 championship commenced on Sunday 14 January 2007 with the final table held on Friday 19 January 2007. The buy-in was $10,500 ($10,000+$500). A record 747 players entered, which generated a prize pool of $7,470,000. The top 80 players were "in the money" and received between $15,000 and $1,500,000 each.

The 2008 championship concluded on Sunday 20 January 2008 with the winner being the 21-year-old Russian Alexander Kostritsyn. The buy-in was $10,500 ($10,000+$500). A record 780 players entered, which generated a prize pool of $7,800,000. The top 80 players were "in the money" and received between $15,000 and $1,650,000 each. The 2009 event will feature a total of 15 tournaments. The Main Event will have a guaranteed $2 million first prize. It will also feature ten players taking part in the first Million Dollar Poker Cash Game, the largest poker game of its kind anywhere in the world. Ten players will be required to stake a minimum of $1 million, though it is expected that some players will bring more to the table. The Aussie Millions is now regarded as the largest poker tournament in the Southern Hemisphere and the sixth-largest internationally (by prize pool).

== Television ==
In 2013, Crown's Aussie Millions Poker Championship television coverage, produced by McGuire Media in conjunction with Poker PROductions, was a nine-episode series broadcast on One HD and ESPN Australia. The series was hosted by Lynn Gilmartin, with commentary by Joe Hachem and Jonno Pittock, as well as pro analysis by Antonio Esfandiari.

== Main Event structure ==
The structure of the Main Event is slightly different from that of most other major tournaments. While most major Hold 'em tournaments, including the World Series of Poker Main Event, play at nine-handed tables throughout, the Aussie Millions Main Event begins with eight-handed tables. Play continues eight-handed until the field is reduced to 36 players, at which point all tables are six-handed. The 2009 Aussie Millions Main Event structure will see Day 1 divided into three flights, with blind levels of 90 minutes' duration. From Day 2 until the completion of the tournament, the blind levels are 120 minutes long.

== High roller events ==
The Aussie Millions is also known for its high roller tournaments, which have featured some of the highest buy-ins in history.

=== $100,000 Challenge ===
The high roller trend began in 2006 when the Aussie Millions launched its $100,000 No Limit Holdem Challenge (actual buy in is $100,500, including the $500 entry fee), at that time billed as the highest buy-in of any poker tournament in history. It has a particularly unusual structure:

- Players start with 100,000 chips, a comparatively larger amount compared to both the Aussie Millions and WSOP Main Events.
- Betting is pot limit preflop and no limit afterwards.
- Players are allowed only 30 seconds to act on their hands. At the start of the tournament, each player is given three extensions of 30 seconds each for use during the tournament.

The $100,000 Challenge was first played in 2006, with 10 entrants. Eighteen entered the Challenge in 2007, 25 in 2008, and 24 in 2010. Daniel Shak won the 2010 tournament for a total prize of A$1,200,000. A record field of 38 played in the 2011 edition.

=== $250,000 Super High Roller ===
With a number of other poker events adding tournaments with buy-ins comparable to that of the $100,000 Challenge, the Aussie Millions added a tournament with a $250,000 buy-in in 2011, which the organisers again claimed as the world's highest. (Since then, the World Series of Poker has held an official event with a US$1 million buy-in.) It was originally scheduled to be a heads-up no-limit event, but the organisers changed the format twice, settling on what they thought would be a single-table no-limit hold 'em tournament. However, 20 players entered the inaugural $250K tournament, including major stars Phil Ivey, Erik Seidel, Tom Dwan, Chris Ferguson, John Juanda, David Benyamine and Annette Obrestad, plus Sam Trickett, who had just won that year's $100K event. Seidel, who had finished second in the $100K event, won the $2.5 million first prize, defeating Trickett in heads-up play.

The 2012 event was won by Ivey, who defeated 15 other players to win $2 million, the largest prize of his career. Trickett won the 2013 event, also winning $2 million after defeating 17 other players.

== Results ==
=== Main Event Winners ===
==== 1998 Australian Poker Championships (Limit Hold'em) ====
- Buy-in: $1,000
- Date: 26 July 1998
- Number of buy-ins: 74
- Total prize pool: $74,000
- Number of Payouts: 9

Final Table
Place	Name	Prize
1st	(Australia) Alex Horowitz	$25,900
2nd	(Australia) Ken Eastwood	$14,800
3rd	(Australia) David Gorr	$7,400
4th	(Australia) Leo Boxell	$4,810
5th	(Australia) Mike Ivin	$3,700
6th	(England) Jason Gray	$2,960
7th	(Australia) Michael Marcos	$2,220
8th	(United States) Vince Oliver	$1,850
9th	(Slovakia) Emilia Garvenovak	$1,480

==== 1999 Australian Poker Championships (Pot-Limit Hold'em) ====
- Buy-in: $1,000
- Date: August 1999
- Number of buy-ins: 109
- Total prize pool: $109,000
- Number of Payouts: 18

Final Table
Place	Name	Prize
1st	(Australia) Milo Nadalin	$38,150
2nd	(Australia) Adam Haman	$21,800
3rd	(Australia) Joe Meissner	$10,900
4th	(Australia) Sam Khouiss	$7,085
5th	(Australia) Larry Jones	$5,450
6th	(Australia) Billy Argyros	$4,360
7th	(Australia) Brian Mulvihill	$3,270
8th	(Australia) Vic Thornton	$2,725
9th	(Australia) John Maver	$2,180

==== 2000 Australian Poker Championships ====
- Buy-in: $1,500
- Date: Sunday, 27 August 2000
- Number of buy-ins: 109
- Total prize pool: $173,500
- Number of Payouts: 18

Final Table
Place	Name	Prize
1st	(Australia) Leo Boxell	$65,225
2nd	(Australia) Gerry Fitt	$32,700
3rd	(Australia) Gary Benson	$16,350
4th	(England) Jason Gray	$10,628
5th	(Australia) Martin Comer	$8,175
6th	(Australia) Charles Cuschieri	$6,540
7th	(Australia) Joe Humunicki	$4,905
8th	(Australia) Wendy Boxell	$4,088
9th	(Australia) Chris Newton	$3,270

==== 2001 Australian Poker Championships ====
- Buy-in: $1,500
- Date: Friday, 24 August 2001
- Number of buy-ins: 101
- Total prize pool: $151,500
- Number of Payouts: 18

Final Table
Place	Name	Prize
1st	(Australia) Sam Korman	$53,025
2nd	(Australia) Eric Sclavos	$30,300
3rd	(Australia) James Potter	$15,150
4th	(Australia) Toby Atroshenko	$9,848
5th	(Australia) John Maitland	$7,575
6th	(New Zealand) Jamil Dia	$6,060
7th	(Australia) Gerry Fitt	$4,545
8th	(New Zealand) Lee Nelson	$3,787
9th	(Australia) Mick Anderson	$3,030

==== 2002 Australian Poker Championships ====
- Buy-in: $5,000
- 2-Day Event: Friday, 11 January 2002 to Saturday, 12 January 2002
- Number of buy-ins: 66
- Total prize pool: $330,000
- Number of Payouts: 10

Final Table
Place	Name	Prize
1st	(Australia) John Maver	$150,000
2nd	(Australia) John Homann	$63,000
3rd	(Australia) David Szetho	$35,000
4th	(New Zealand) Lee Nelson	$24,500
5th	(Australia) Chris Newton	$17,500
6th	(Australia) Toby Atroshenko	$10,500
7th	(Republic of Ireland) Frank Callaghan	$9,625
8th	(Australia) Mike Guttman	$7,875
9th	(New Zealand) Constantin Harach	$7,000

==== 2003 Crown Australian Poker Championships ====
- Buy-in: $10,000
- Date: Sunday, 12 January 2003
- Number of buy-ins: 122
- Total prize pool: $1,220,000
- Number of Payouts: 18

Final Table
Place	Name	Prize
1st	(England) Peter Costa	$394,870
2nd	(Australia) Leo Boxell	$225,640
3rd	(England) Harry Demetriou	$124,102
4th	(Australia) Sam Khouiss	$101,538
5th	(Australia) Joe Cabret	$78,974
6th	(England) Ram Vaswani	$67,692
7th	(Australia) Martin Comer	$56,410
8th	(Austria) Erich Kollmann	$45,128
9th	(England) Joe Beevers	$33,846

==== 2004 Crown Australian Poker Championships ====
- Buy-in: $10,000
- Date: Thursday, 15 January 2004
- Number of buy-ins: 133
- Total prize pool: $1,330,000
- Number of Payouts: 18

Final Table
Place	Name	Prize
1st	(England) Tony Bloom	$426,500
2nd	(United States) Jesse Jones	$243,700
3rd	(United States) Kenna James	$134,000
4th	(Australia) David Hatzis	$109,700
5th	(England) Mark Banin	$85,300
6th	(Australia) Brian Hull	$73,100
7th	(Australia) Mike Ivin	$60,900
8th	(Australia) Han Luu	$48,700
9th	(Australia) Tino Lechich	$36,600

==== 2005 Crown Australian Poker Championships ====
- Buy-in: $10,000
- 3-Day Event: Tuesday, 18 January 2005 to Thursday, 20 January 2005
- Number of buy-ins: 263
- Total prize pool: $2,630,000
- Number of Payouts: 40

Final Table
Place	Name	Prize
1st	(New Zealand) Jamil Dia	$1,000,000
2nd	(United States) Mike Simkin	$465,000
3rd	(Australia) George Mamacas	$250,000
4th	(Australia) Martin Comer	$170,000
5th	(Republic of Ireland) Stephen McLean	$110,000
6th	(Australia) Warwick Dunnett	$80,000
7th	(United States) Jonathan Paul	$70,000
8th	(Australia) Gary Benson	$60,000
9th	(Netherlands) Marcel Lüske	$50,000

==== 2006 Crown Australian Poker Championships ====
- Buy-in: $10,000
- 6-Day Event: Saturday, 14 January 2006 to Thursday, 19 January 2006
- Number of buy-ins: 418
- Total prize pool: $4,180,000
- Number of Payouts: 48

Final Table
Place	Name	Prize
1st	(New Zealand) Lee Nelson	$1,295,800
2nd	(United States) Robert Neary	$689,700
3rd	(Canada) Nenad Medic	$376,200
4th	(United States) Shannon Shorr	$271,700
5th	(United States) Jeff Sealey	$209,000
6th	(Australia) Russell Davies	$167,200
7th	(Australia) Wes Bugiera	$125,400

==== 2007 Crown Australian Poker Championships ====
- Buy-in: $10,000
- 6-Day Event: Sunday, 14 January 2007 to Friday, 19 January 2007
- Number of buy-ins: 747
- Total prize pool: $7,470,000
- Number of Payouts: 80

Final Table
Place	Name	Prize
1st	(Denmark) Gus Hansen	$1,500,000
2nd	(United States) Jimmy Fricke	$1,000,000
3rd	(Republic of Ireland) Andy Black	$700,000
4th	(Australia) Julius Colman	$500,000
5th	(Germany) Hans Vogl	$400,000
6th	(Canada) Marc Karam	$300,000
7th	(United States) Kristy Gazes	$220,000

==== 2008 Crown Australian Poker Championships ====
- Buy-in: $10,000
- 6-Day Event: Sunday, 14 January 2008 to Friday, 19 January 2008
- Number of buy-ins: 780
- Total prize pool: A$7,758,500
- Number of Payouts: 80

Final Table
Place	Name	Prize
1st	(Russia) Alexander Kostritsyn	$1,650,000
2nd	(United States) Erik Seidel	$1,000,000
3rd	(Australia) Michael Chrisanthopoulos	$700,000
4th	(Australia) Peter Ling	$500,000
5th	(Australia) Nino Marotta	$400,000
6th	(Australia) Antonio Casale	$300,000
7th	(Australia) Peter Mobbs	$225,000

==== 2009 Crown Australian Poker Championship ====
- Buy-in: $10,000
- 7-Day Event: Saturday, 17 January 2009 to Friday, 23 January 2009
- Number of buy-ins: 681
- Total prize pool: $6,810,000
- Number of Payouts: 64

Final Table
Place	Name	Prize
1st	(Australia) Stewart Scott	$2,000,000
2nd	(United States) Peter Rho	$1,000,000
3rd	(Canada) Elliot Smith	$700,000
4th	(Australia) Rajkumar Ramakrishnan	$400,000
5th	(Australia) Sam Capra	$300,000
6th	(United States) Zach Gruneberg	$210,000
7th	(England) Richard Ashby	$150,000

==== 2010 Crown Australian Poker Championship ====
- Buy-in: $10,000
- 7-Day Event: Sunday, 24 January 2010 to Saturday, 30 January 2010
- Number of buy-ins: 746
- Total prize pool: $7,460,000
- Number of Payouts: 72

Final Table
Place	Name	Prize
1st	(Australia) Tyron Krost	$2,000,000
2nd	(Denmark) Frederik Jensen	$1,100,000
3rd	(Canada) Sorel Mizzi	$715,000
4th	(Australia) Kosta Varoxis	$450,000
5th	(Canada) Peter Jetten	$350,000
6th	(United States) Steven Friedlander	$250,000
7th	(Norway) Annette Obrestad	$175,000

==== 2011 Crown Australian Poker Championship ====
- Buy-in: $10,000
- 7-Day Event: Sunday, 23 January 2011 to Saturday, 29 January 2011
- Number of buy-ins: 721
- Total prize pool: $7,210,000
- Number of Payouts: 72

Final Table
Place	Name	Prize
1st	(Australia) David Gorr	$2,000,000
2nd	(United Kingdom) James Keys	$1,035,000
3rd	(Australia) Jeff Rossiter	$700,000
4th	(Australia) Michael Ryan	$450,000
5th	(United States) Randy Dorfman	$325,000
6th	(United Kingdom) Samad Razavi	$225,000
7th	(United Kingdom) Chris Moorman	$175,000

==== 2012 Crown Australian Poker Championship ====
- Buy-in: $10,000
- 7-Day Event: Sunday, 22 January 2012 to Saturday, 28 January 2012
- Number of buy-ins: 659
- Total prize pool: $6,590,000
- Number of Payouts: 72

Final Table
Place	Name	Prize
1st	(Australia) Oliver Speidel	$1,600,000
2nd	(Hong Kong) Kenneth Wong	$1,000,000
3rd	(Australia) Mile Krstanoski	$610,000
4th	(Sweden) Mohamad Kowssarie	$405,000
5th	(Australia) Patrick Healy	$300,000
6th	(Hong Kong) Bjorn Li	$230,000
7th	(Canada) Yann Dion	$170,000

==== 2013 Crown Australian Poker Championship ====
- Buy-in: $10,000
- 7-Day Event: Sunday, 27 January to Saturday, 2 February 2013
- Number of buy-ins: 629
- Total prize pool: $6,290,000
- Number of Payouts: 64

Final Table
Place	Name	Prize
1st	(Malaysia) Mervin Chan	$1,600,000
2nd	(Australia) Joseph Cabret	$1,000,000
3rd	(Finland) Patrik Antonius	$600,000
4th	(United States) Dan Shak	$400,000
5th	(Australia) Jarrod Glennon	$290,000
6th	(New Zealand) David Yan	$220,000
7th	(Hong Kong) Jay Tan	$150,000

==== 2014 Aussie Millions Poker Championship ====
- Buy-in: $10,600
- 7-Day Event: Sunday, 2 February to Sunday, 9 February 2014
- Number of buy-ins: 668
- Total prize pool: $6,680,000
- Number of Payouts: 72

Final Table
Place	Name	Prize
1st	(Canada) Ami Barer	$1,600,000
2nd	(Canada) Sorel Mizzi	$1,000,000
3rd	(United States) Jake Balsiger	$650,000
4th	(United States) Darren Rabinowitz	$450,000
5th	(United States) Vincent Rubianes	$335,000
6th	(Australia) Andrew Phaedonos	$250,000
7th	(United States) Scott Seiver	$170,000

==== 2015 Aussie Millions Poker Championship ====
- Buy-in: $10,600
- 7-Day Event: 25 January–1 February
- Number of buy-ins: 648
- Total prize pool: $6,480,000
- Number of Payouts: 72

Final Table
Place	Name	Prize
1st	(Australia) Manny Stavropoulos	$1,385,500
2nd	(Germany) Lennart Uphoff	$1,214,500
3rd	(New Caledonia) Joel Douaglin	$630,000
4th	(United Kingdom) James Rann	$430,000
5th	(United States) Brian Rast	$315,000
6th	(Australia) Anthony Legg	$235,000
7th	(United States) Richard Lyndaker	$160,000

==== 2016 Aussie Millions Poker Championship ====
- Buy-in: $10,600
- 6-Day Event: 25–31 January
- Number of buy-ins: 732
- Total prize pool: $7,320,000
- Number of Payouts: 81

Final Table
Place	Name	Prize
1st	(Canada) Ari Engel	$1,600,000
2nd	(United States) Tony Dunst	$1,000,000
3rd	(United States) Samantha Abernathy	$624,000
4th	(Australia) Alex Lynskey	$445,000
5th	(Australia) Dylan Honeyman	$340,000
6th	(Taiwan) Kitty Kuo	$270,000
7th	(Australia) John Apostolidis	$210,000

==== 2017 Aussie Millions Poker Championship ====
- Buy-in: $10,000
- 9-Day Event: 22–30 January
- Number of buy-ins: 725
- Total prize pool: $7,685,000
- Number of Payouts: 80

Final Table
Place	Name	Prize
1st	(Australia) Shurane Vijayaram	$1,600,000
2nd	(United Kingdom) Ben Heath	$1,000,000
3rd	(Germany) Tobias Hausen	$620,000
4th	(Australia) Jeff Rossiter	$440,000
5th	(Germany) Fedor Holz	$335,000
6th	(United States) David Olson	$270,000
7th	(Australia) Luke Roberts	$210,000

==== 2018 Aussie Millions Poker Championship ====
- Buy-in: $10,600
- 8-Day Event: 28 January–4 February
- Number of buy-ins: 800
- Total prize pool: $8,000,000
- Number of Payouts: 88

Final Table
Place	Name	Prize
1st	(England) Toby Lewis	$1,458,198
2nd	(Switzerland) Stefan Huber	$909,699
3rd	(Norway) Espen Solaas	$1,177,103
4th	(Australia) Chul-Hyon Park	$470,000
5th	(United States) Mike Del Vecchio	$370,000
6th	(Australia) Ben Richardson	$300,000
7th	(Belgium) Johan Schumacher	$235,000

==== 2019 Aussie Millions Poker Championship ====
- Buy-in: $10,600
- 7-Day Event: 28 January–3 February
- Number of buy-ins: 822
- Total prize pool: $8,220,000
- Number of Payouts: 88

Final Table
Place	Name	Prize
1st	(United States) Bryn Kenney	$1,272,598*
2nd	(United States) Mike Del Vecchio	$1,272,162*
3rd	(Australia) Andrew Hinrichsen	$1,098,739*
4th	(Australia) Clinton Taylor	$483,000
5th	(Australia) Matthew Wakeman	$380,300
6th	(South Korea) Gyeong Byeong Lee	$309,000
7th	(Australia) Hamish Crawshaw	$242,000

*-The final three players made a deal, with Kenney being crowned champion

==== 2020 Aussie Millions Poker Championship ====
- Buy-in: $10,600
- 7-Day Event: 17–24 January 2020
- Number of buy-ins: 820
- Total prize pool: $8,200,000
- Number of Payouts: 88

Final Table
Place	Name	Prize
1st	(Australia) Vincent Wan	$1,318,000*
2nd	(Vietnam) Ngoc Tai Hoang	$1,318,000*
3rd	(New Zealand) Gareth Pepper	$1,000,000*
4th	(Germany) Nino Ullmann	$480,160
5th	(United States) Erik Seidel	$378,660
6th	(Germany) Oliver Weis	$307,820
7th	(Canada) Nicolas Malo	$240,080

* – Denotes deal between the final three players

==== 2021 Aussie Millions Poker Championship ====
POSTPONED due COVID-19 – The popular annual Australian poker extravaganza is officially postponed. But organizers for the popular event hope to reschedule it for later in the year. "Crown will continue to monitor and review the situation, working closely with the Victorian Government and health authorities to determine if and when such events can be safely revisited. We look forward to scheduling these long-standing annual events when it is deemed safe for us to do so."

==== 2022 Aussie Millions Poker Championship ====
A new responsible gambling policy released in 2021 make Crown Melbourne rethink poker tournament and live tables ath their Casino. According Crown, the new policy have a "12 Hour Daily Visit" for all guests, and this will make poker tournaments unvaliable at Crown Casino. "It doesn’t look like the Aussie Millions will be back anytime soon" – PMAunderstands Crown Melbourne has yet to appoint a new tournament director, no surprise given the pandemic-related issued of the past two years.

==== 2023 Aussie Millions Poker Championship ====
Poker Tournaments will no longer be running at Crown – The popular Australian tournament series last ran in January 2020 before the COVID-19 pandemic shut down live poker at many casinos around the world.

=== High Roller Winners (A$100,000 Challenge) ===
Year	Winner	Prize	Entries	Total prize pool
2006	(Indonesia) John Juanda	A$1,000,000	10	A$1,000,000
2007	(United States) Erick Lindgren	A$1,000,000	18	A$1,800,000
2008	(United States) Howard Lederer	A$1,250,000	25	A$2,500,000
2009	(Australia) David Steicke	A$1,200,000	23	A$2,300,000
2010	(United States) Daniel Shak	A$1,200,000	24	A$2,400,000
2011	(United Kingdom) Sam Trickett	A$1,525,000	38	A$3,800,000
2012	(United States) Dan Smith	A$1,012,000	22	A$2,200,000
2013	(United States) Andrew Robl	A$1,000,000	22	A$2,200,000
2014	(Ukraine) Yevgeniy Timoshenko	A$2,000,000	47 (29 Rebuys)	A$7,486,000
2015	(Malaysia) Richard Yong	A$1,870,000	70	A$6,860,000
2016	(Germany) Fabian Quoss	A$1,446,480	41 (11 Rebuys)	A$4,018,000
2017	(United States) Nick Petrangelo	A$882,000	18	A$1,764,000
2018	(Malaysia) Michael Lim	A$931,000	19	A$1,862,000
2019	(United States) Cary Katz	A$1,481,760	42	A$4,116,000
2020	(Australia) Kahle Burns	A$1,746,360	54	A$5,292,000

=== Super High Roller Winners (A$250,000 Challenge) ===
Year	Winner	Prize	Entries	Total prize pool
2011	(United States) Erik Seidel	A$2,500,000	20	A$5,000,000
2012	(United States) Phil Ivey	A$2,000,000	16	A$4,000,000
2013	(United Kingdom) Sam Trickett	A$2,000,000	18	A$4,500,000
2014	(United States) Phil Ivey	A$4,000,000	30 (16 Rebuys)	A$11,270,000
2015	(United States) Phil Ivey	A$2,205,000	25	A$6,105,000
2016	(United States) Steve O'Dwyer	A$951,960	16 (1 Rebuy)	A$3,920,000
