= World Heads-Up Poker Championship =

Annual poker tournament

The World Heads-Up Poker Championship (WHUPC) was an annual elimination-format poker tournament of heads-up no limit Texas hold'em matches. The tournament was co-created by Late Night Poker's Nic Szeremeta, PokerInEurope's Jon Shoreman, and gaming journalist Rich Geller.

The event has run from 2001 to 2010 and was held in Europe. Entry was open to all. Its success led to America's creation of the National Heads-Up Poker Championship.

From 2001 to 2003, the event was held at the Concord Card Casino, Vienna, Austria. From 2004 to 2008, the event was held at the Grand Casino, Barcelona, Spain. In 2009 and 2010, the event was held at the Victoria Casino, London, England. The event did not return in 2011 and its website has not been updated since 2010.

The event was filmed each year for TV broadcast around the world, and was the first televised poker tournament to use lipstick cameras in the table to view players hole cards. In 2010 the event was broadcast live via the Internet for the first time at PokerInEuropeLive.com with commentary provided by Mike Carlson, Pete Singleton, and Neil Channing.

== Results ==
Year	Winner	Prize Money	Runner-Up	Semi-Finalists	Quarter-Finalists	Final 16
2001	Bruno Fitoussi	S 1,068,033	Thomas "Amarillo Slim" Preston	Vincent Oliver; Asher Derei	Christoph Haller; Nick Teti; Casey Kastle; Michael Keiner	Layne Flack; Simon Trumper; Billy Argyros; Maurizio Biasini; Dave Mosley; Mike Rocco; Nathan Wade
2002	Kirill Gerasimov	€60,000	Roy Brindley	Tony G; Mark Duran	Chris Bigler; Mario Bentivedo; Asher Derei	Barny Boatman; Bruno Fitoussi; Mel Judah; Marcel Lüske; Steven Au-Young; Michel Leibgorin; Vincent Oliver; Siegfried Stockinger
2003	John Cernuto	€60,000	Anthony Chapman	Ivo Donev; Salah Alsayegh	Ram Vaswani; Mickey Wernick; Randy Holland; Bob Coombes	Dave Colclough; Barbara Enright; Scotty Nguyen; Padraig Parkinson; Michael Frisby; Christian Skjonstad; Siegfried Stockinger; Luzhe Zhang
2004	Angel Blanco Puras	€100,000	Mark Banin	Juan Carlos Mortensen; Dave Ulliott	John Cernuto; Anders Rossander; Rumit Somaiya; Mats Törnros	Roy Brindley; Bruno Fitoussi; Rob Hollink; Guosen Chen; Raul Paez Corral; Bo Estefan Enberg; Erik Sagström; Vladimir Troyanovsky
2005	Peter Gunnarson	€100,000	Simon Nowab	Dave Colclough; John Falconer	Pascal Perrault; Peter Abela; Andreas Hagen; David Leigh	Jac Arama; Simon Trumper; Paul Jackson; Jin Cai Lin; Raul Paez Corral; Stephen Pearce; Frey Rutenskold; Jamie Sharrat
2006	Isaac Mayolas de Vega	€125,000	Paul Jackson	George Danzer; Chen Tsai Feng	Robert Binelli; Frank Bluemlein; Nick Gibson; Markus Golser	Juan Carlos Mortensen; Ben Battle; Thierry Cazals; Thomas Fougeron; Jan Heitmann; Shannon Shorr; Santiago Holguin Romero; Santiago Terrazas
2007	Jeff Kimber	€125,000	Dan Carter	Carlos Ilado Fabregas; Mikko Lehtonen	Dave Ulliott; Dan Simcelescu; Oscar Blanco Carrasco; Gilles Sanchez	Michael Keiner; Don Fagan; Peter Karall; Jose Salazar Navas; David Lacoste; Haykel Vidal; Harold Olsen; Laurens Houtman
2008	Mauro Stivoli	€65,000	Jonas Danielsson	Nicolas Dervaux; Riccardo Bozicevich	Dan Carter; Juan Sastre Durin; Juan Maceiras; Haykel Cgertf Vidal	Lopez Gonzalez, Iago; Cayetano Garcia Ayala; Harold Olson; Erik Markus Friberg; James Atkin; Stefano Fiore; Pier paolo Fabretti; Dave Penly
2009	Bambos Xanthos	£65,000	James Mitchell	Victor Ilyukhin; Laurence Houghton	Thor Drexel; Richard Gryko; Tony Cascarino; Dario Minieri	Jan Teilhof; Robert Price; Paul Zimbler; Sorel Mizzi; Bryan Pellegrino; Steven Wilmot; Keith Hawkins; Albert Iversen
2010	Nik Persaud	£30,000	Leon Louis	Toby Lewis; Jeff Kimber	Victoria Coren; Richard Gryko; Marius Torbeggson	James Reid; Nick Wealthall; Basile Yaiche; Jonathan Prested; Tony Fayad; Guillaume Delagorce
