= Dara O'Kearney =

Irish ultramarathon runner and poker player (born 1965)

Dara O'Kearney, born 17 June 1965 in Ennis, County Clare, is an Irish international ultra runner and professional poker player. He is the son of Irish language activist and writer Sean Ua Cearnaigh, and nephew of Irish politician Chris Flood.

He won the 2005 Tresco marathon, the 2006 New York Road Runners 60K ultra marathon, the 2007 Schinnen 50K, the 2008 Brno Indoor 6 hour race, and was the 2007 Irish 24 hour running champion.

On the poker front, O'Kearney won the 2008 European Deepstack Poker Championship, defeating a high quality field that included Joe Beevers, Julian Thew, Tony Baitson, Arnaud Mattern, John Falconer, Dave Colclough, Conor Tate, Owen Mullen, Mickey Wernick, Barny Boatman and Christy Smith. In 2009, he was ranked number 2 in live tournaments in the official Irish Poker Rankings, and again in 2010 & again in 2014.

In 2015, O'Kearney won the Mini Irish Open, and finished second in event 45 of the WSOP.

As of 2020, he has over $3 million in cashes online and over $1 million live. He is a brand ambassador for Unibet Poker and ShareMyPair, and lead author of the books "Poker Satellite Strategy" and "PKO Poker Strategy" (co-author Barry Carter). His blog is one of the most read poker blogs, and he cohosts popular poker podcast The Chip Race alongside David Lappin.

In April 2019, O'Kearney joined CardsChat as a poker expert.

In September 2023, O'Kearney joined Tight Poker as a poker expert and fact checker.
