= 2008 World Series of Poker Europe =

Series of poker tournaments

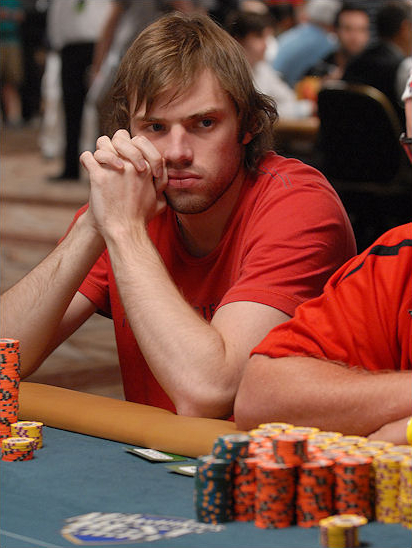
Ivan Demidov made it to the WSOP and WSOPE Main Event Final Tables in 2008

The World Series of Poker Europe (WSOPE) is the first expansion effort of World Series of Poker-branded poker tournaments outside the United States. Since 1970, participants have had to travel to Las Vegas if they wanted to compete in the World Series of Poker (WSOP). Although the WSOP held circuit events in other locations, the main tournaments, which awarded bracelets to the winners, were exclusively held in Las Vegas. The inaugural WSOPE, held in 2007, marked the first time that a WSOP bracelet was awarded outside Las Vegas.

In 2004, Harrah's Casinos purchased the rights to the WSOP label. Harrah's later purchased London Clubs International (LCI). LCI operates three casinos in the London area—Fifty, Leicester Square, and The Sportsman. After the purchase of these casinos, Harrah's decided to expand its WSOP label into Europe. European casinos typically have a different environment than those in the U.S. Jeffrey Pollack, the WSOP Commissioner, indicated that the WSOPE would have a "style and flair that is both unique and appropriate to the setting. So don't be surprised if we require participants to wear blazers at the tables. If James Bond were hosting a poker tournament it may look like the World Series of Poker Europe."

In marketing the WSOPE, Harrah's Casino did not rely upon the reputation of Harrah's or the WSOP alone. On 5 July 2007, Harrah's announced its alliance with England-based Betfair, one of the largest online gaming companies in the world. The agreement, the largest-ever union of an online and offline gaming company, is intended to build on Betfair's European reputation in advertising the WSOPE. Due to changes in U.S. laws, effective in 2007, the WSOP could no longer accept money from online gambling companies. This prevented the WSOP from acknowledging WSOP qualifiers from online events. The WSOPE is not bound by this limitation. The United Kingdom Gambling Act of 2005 allows for legal regulated online poker sites. Furthermore, as the laws that govern the age of gambling differ in England than the U.S., the WSOPE admits younger players. In 2007, one of these younger players, 18-year-old Annette "Annette_15" Obrestad became the youngest player to win a WSOP bracelet event.

The second WSOPE took place between 19 September and 1 October 2008. It consisted of four events held at the Casino at the Empire in Leicester Square, London. The 2008 WSOPE was particularly notable, as Jesper Hougaard became the first person to win a bracelet at both the WSOP and WSOPE. Three-time bracelet winner John Juanda won his fourth bracelet in the WSOPE Main Event. Ivan Demidov, who was one of the November Nine—players scheduled to play in November for the WSOP Main Event—advanced to the final table of the WSOPE, becoming the first player to make it to the final table at both the WSOP and WSOPE Main Events.

== Key ==
*	Elected to the Poker Hall of Fame
(#/#)	This denotes a bracelet winner. The first number is the number of bracelets won in 2008. The second number is the total number of bracelets won. Both numbers represent totals as of that point during the tournament.
Place	What place each player at the final table finished
Name	The player who made it to the final table
Prize (£)	The amount of money, in British Pounds (£), awarded for each finish at the event's final table

== Results ==
=== Event 1: £1,500 No-Limit Hold'em ===
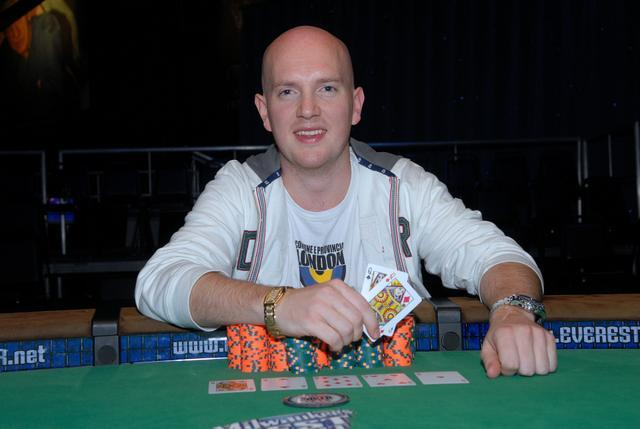
Hougaard after winning his first WSOP Bracelet in 2008

- 4-Day Event: Friday, 19 September 2008 to Monday, 22 September 2008
- Number of buy-ins: 410
- Total Prize Pool: £615,000
- Number of Payouts: 45
- Winning Hand: A♦ J♦

Final Table
Place	Name	Prize
1st	Jesper Hougaard (2/2)	£144,218
2nd	Fuad Serhan	£89,175
3rd	Yevgeniy Timoshenko	£55,350
4th	Neil Channing	£44,588
5th	John Dwyer	£36,285
6th	Adam Junglen	£28,598
7th	Linda Lee	£22,448
8th	Ian Woodley	£17,835
9th	Daniel Nutt	£13,222

=== Event 2: £2,500 H.O.R.S.E. ===
- 3-Day Event: Monday, 22 September 2008 to Wednesday, 24 September 2008
- Number of buy-ins: 110
- Total Prize Pool: £275,000
- Number of Payouts: 16
- Winning Hand: 8♥ 4♣ 8♣ 6♣ Q♦ J♥ Q♥ (Seven-card stud)

Final Table
Place	Name	Prize
1st	Sherkhan Farnood (1/1)	£76,999
2nd	Ivo Donev (0/1)	£48,125
3rd	Howard Lederer (0/2)	£30,250
4th	Jeff Duvall	£22,000
5th	Mark Gregorich	£17,188
6th	Phil Ivey (0/7)	£13,750
7th	Jeff Lisandro (0/4)	£11,000
8th	Spencer Lawrence	£8,938

=== Event 3: £5,000 Pot-Limit Omaha ===
- 3-Day Event: Wednesday, 24 September 2008 to Friday, 26 September 2008
- Number of buy-ins: 165
- Total Prize Pool: £825,000
- Number of Payouts: 18
- Winning Hand: K♥ A♣ 3♣ K♦

Final Table
Place	Name	Prize
1st	Theo Jørgensen (1/1)	£218,626
2nd	Sorel Mizzi	£132,000
3rd	Eric Dalby	£84,562
4th	Erik Friberg	£66,000
5th	Max Pescatori (1/2)	£51,562
6th	David Penly	£41,250
7th	Chris Ferguson (0/5)	£33,000
8th	Jason Mercier	£26,812
9th	Tomi Nyback	£22,688

=== Event 4: £10,000 No-Limit Hold'em Main Event ===
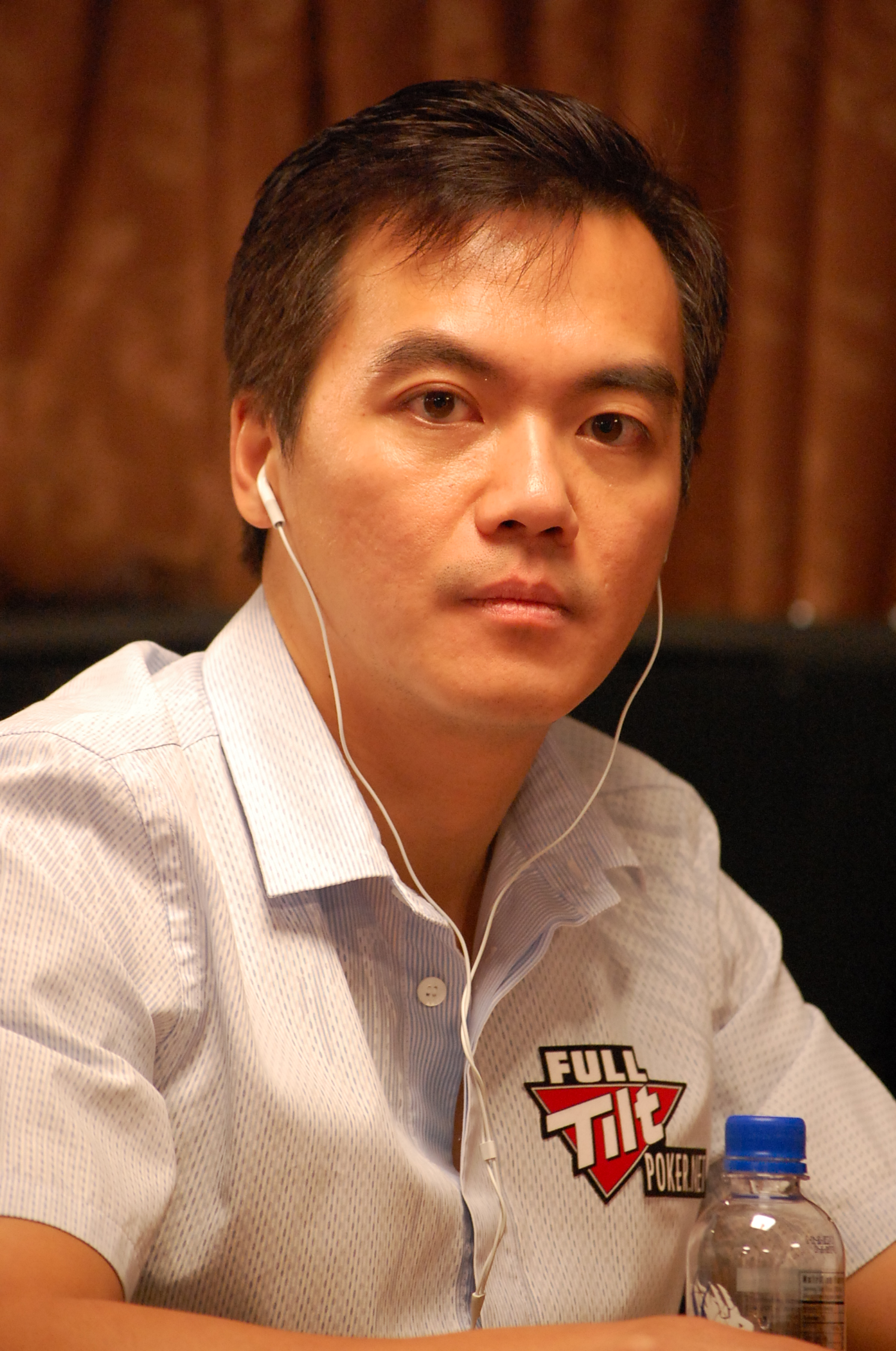
Juanda at the 2008 World Series of Poker

- 6-Day Event: Saturday, 27 September 2008 to Thursday, 2 October 2008
- Number of buy-ins: 362
- Total Prize Pool: £3,620,000
- Number of Payouts: 36
- Winning Hand: K♠ 6♣

Final Table
Place	Name	Prize
1st	John Juanda (1/4)	£868,800
2nd	Stanislav Alekhin	£533,950
3rd	Ivan Demidov	£334,850
4th	Bengt Sonnert	£271,500
5th	Daniel Negreanu (1/4)	£217,200
6th	Scott Fischman (0/2)	£171,950
7th	Robin Keston	£135,750
8th	Toni Hiltunen	£108,600
9th	Chris Elliott	£81,450

The final table took a WSOP record 22 hours to finish. Heads up between John Juanda and Stanislav Alekhin took more than seven hours of play, another WSOP record. It took 242 hands to eliminate the first seven players and it took another 242 hands heads up before Juanda secured the win.

Ivan Demidov finished third, becoming the first player to make the final table at both the WSOP and WSOPE Main Events.
