= Nik Persaud =

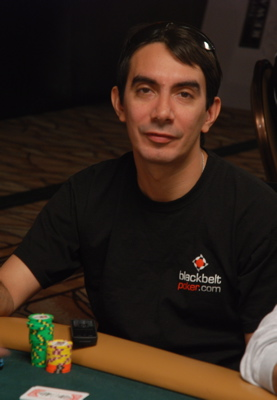
- Nickname: reraiseallin

World Series of Poker
- Bracelet: None
- Money finishes: 2
- Highest WSOP Main Event finish: 423rd, 2005

Nikhil Persaud is a professional poker player from London.

== Career ==
Persaud participated in a number of televised events, including the 2009 series: Late Night Poker. His best performance on the small screen came in 2006 when he won both his heat and semi-final of the European Open III in Maidstone before finishing fifth in the final for $25,000. On the road to the final, he defeated likes of Ian Frazer and Thomas Bihl, but the event was ultimately won by Irish veteran Liam Flood.

He writes a monthly strategy column for Bluff Magazine, and he is often featured as a speaker at various Boot Camps across the country, including the 2009 and 2010 Poker in the Park in London and Leicester Square. Persaud also commentates alongside Jesse May on Matchroom Sport televised poker shows.

On 27 April 2009, Persaud co-launched both Black Belt Poker with fellow poker pro and the 2008 Irish Open champion Neil Channing. He is also sponsored by the site as one of their Brown Belts.

In 2009, Persaud cashed in the World Series of Poker Main Event, finishing 549th for $23,196. He also made the money in 2005.

On 22 November 2010, Persaud was the winner of the 2010 World Heads-Up Poker Championship at the London Grosvenor Victoria Casino, defeating amongst others; Team PokerStars Pro, 2006 London EPT winner Victoria Coren, 2010 EPT Vilamoura winner Toby Lewis, and eventual runner-up Leon Louis.
