= PartyPoker.com Football & Poker Legends Cup =

Poker tournament

The PartyPoker.com Football & Poker Legends Cup is a televised poker tournament, airing in the United Kingdom on Five from April 2006 onwards, in the lead-up to the 2006 FIFA World Cup.

== Format ==
Each team consists of three players: two poker professionals and one former or current professional football (soccer) player. Elimination matches take place between two countries, with the table winner progressing along with the rest of their team to the next round of the tournament.

Three hours are allowed for each match. If a result does not occur within that time limit, a one-hour extra time takes place. If there is still no result, a penalty shootout then takes place.

If the tournament director, "Mad" Marty Wilson notices any attempts at collusion, he administers a yellow card to that player, with the result of half of that player's chips being distributed evenly to the opposition team. If a second infraction is noticed, a red card is shown to the player, eliminating the player from the tournament immediately, with all of that player's chips being distributed evenly to the opposition team.

The idea that collusion could be used as a tactic to gain an advantage meant that the format of the competition was widely criticised.

Commentary was provided by Jesse May and Padraig Parkinson.

== Teams ==
England	USA	Canada	Australia
(England) Dave Ulliott	(United States) Mike Sexton	(Canada) Daniel Negreanu	(Australia) Tony G
(England) Ian Frazer	(United States) Kenna James	(Canada) Evelyn Ng	(Australia) Damon Rasheed
(England) Alan Ball	(United States) Carlos Bocanegra	(Canada) Jason deVos	(Australia) Mark Bosnich

Ireland	Russia	Germany	France
(Republic of Ireland) Andrew Black	(Russia) Alex Kuzmin	(Germany) Toni Vardjavand	(France) Claude Cohen
(Republic of Ireland) Peter Roche	(Russia) Olesya Kabbaj	(Germany) Lothar Landauer	(France) Anthony Lellouche
(Republic of Ireland) Tony Cascarino	(Russia) Sergei Baltacha	(Germany) Uli Stein	(France) Laurent Charvet

Italy	Netherlands	Sweden	Denmark
(Italy) Michael Greco	(Netherlands) Marcel Lüske	(Sweden) Ken Lennaárd	(Denmark) Gus Hansen
(Italy) Alan Vinson	(Netherlands) Noah Boeken	(Sweden) Erik Sagström	(Denmark) Theo Jørgensen
(Italy) Wesley Garcia	(Netherlands) Glenn Helder	(Sweden) Tomas Brolin	(Denmark) Kim Christofte

Norway	Northern Ireland	Wales	Scotland
(Norway) Henning Granstad	(Northern Ireland) Conor Tate	(Wales) Dave Colclough	(Scotland) Tony Chessa
(Norway) Torstein Iversen	(Northern Ireland) Marty Smyth	(Wales) Iwan Jones	(Scotland) Rory Matthews
(Norway) Espen Baardsen	(Northern Ireland) Norman Whiteside	(Wales) Neville Southall	(Scotland) Ray Stewart

== Results ==
=== Pre-season friendly match ===
Date	Winner	Runner-up	Remaining Finishing Order
6 April 2006	(England) Alan Ball	(Sweden) Tomas Brolin	(Republic of Ireland) Tony Cascarino; (Germany) Uli Stein; (Northern Ireland) Norman Whiteside; (Scotland) Ray Stewart

=== Regular season ===
Date	Match	Winner	Runner-up	Remaining Finishing Order
13 April 2006	Heat 1: England vs Germany	(Germany) Uli Stein	(England) Alan Ball	(England) Dave Ulliott ^{(1)}; (England) Ian Frazer; (Germany) Lothar Landauer; (Germany) Toni Vardjavand
20 April 2006	Heat 2: Scotland vs Sweden	(Sweden) Erik Sagström ^{(2)}	(Scotland) Rory Matthews	(Scotland) Tony Chessa; (Sweden) Tomas Brolin; (Sweden) Ken Lennaárd; (Scotland) Ray Stewart
27 April 2006	Heat 3: Northern Ireland vs Italy	(Northern Ireland) Conor Tate	(Northern Ireland) Marty Smyth	(Northern Ireland) Norman Whiteside; (Italy) Wesley Garcia; (Italy) Alan Vinson; (Italy) Michael Greco
4 May 2006	Heat 4: The Netherlands vs Norway	(Netherlands) Noah Boeken	(Norway) Henning Granstad	(Norway) Espen Baardsen; (Norway) Torstein Iversen; (Netherlands) Glenn Helder; (Netherlands) Marcel Lüske
11 May 2006	Heat 5: Republic of Ireland vs Russia	(Republic of Ireland) Andrew Black	(Republic of Ireland) Tony Cascarino	(Russia) Olesya Kabbaj; (Russia) Alex Kuzmin; (Republic of Ireland) Peter Roche; (Russia) Sergei Baltacha
18 May 2006	Heat 6: France vs Denmark	(Denmark) Theo Jørgensen	(France) Anthony Lellouche	(Denmark) Kim Christofte; (France) Claude Cohen; (France) Lauren Charvet; (Denmark) Gus Hansen
25 May 2006	Heat 7: Wales vs U.S.A.	(United States) Carlos Bocanegra	(Wales) Neville Southall	(United States) Kenna James; (United States) Mike Sexton; (Wales) Iwan Jones; (Wales) Dave Colclough
1 June 2006	Heat 8: Canada vs Australia	(Australia) Mark Bosnich	(Australia) Damon Rasheed	(Australia) Tony G; (Canada) Daniel Negreanu; (Canada) Evelyn Ng; (Canada) Jason deVos
8 June 2006	Quarter-final 1: Germany vs Sweden	(Germany) Lothar Landauer	(Germany) Toni Vardjavand	(Sweden) Tomas Brolin; (Sweden) Ken Lennaárd; (Sweden) Erik Sagström; (Germany) Uli Stein
22 June 2006	Quarter-final 2: Northern Ireland vs The Netherlands	(Netherlands) Noah Boeken	(Netherlands) Marcel Lüske	(Northern Ireland) Marty Smyth; (Netherlands) Glenn Helder; (Northern Ireland) Conor Tate; (Northern Ireland) Norman Whiteside
29 June 2006	Quarter-final 3: Republic of Ireland vs Denmark	(Denmark) Gus Hansen	(Denmark) Theo Jørgensen	(Republic of Ireland) Tony Cascarino; (Republic of Ireland) Andrew Black; (Denmark) Kim Christofte; (Republic of Ireland) Peter Roche
6 July 2006	Quarter-final 4: U.S.A. vs Australia	(United States) Mike Sexton	(Australia) Tony G	(Australia) Mark Bosnich; (United States) Carlos Bocanegra; (United States) Kenna James; (Australia) Damon Rasheed
13 July 2006	Semi-final 1: Germany vs The Netherlands	(Germany) Lothar Landauer	(Netherlands) Noah Boeken	(Netherlands) Glenn Helder; (Germany) Uli Stein; (Germany) Toni Vardjavand; (Netherlands) Marcel Lüske
20 July 2006	Semi-final 2: Denmark vs U.S.A.	(Denmark) Theo Jørgensen	(United States) Kenna James	(United States) Mike Sexton; (Denmark) Kim Christofte; (United States) Carlos Bocanegra; (Denmark) Gus Hansen
27 July 2006	Grand Final: Germany vs Denmark	(Denmark) Theo Jørgensen	(Denmark) Gus Hansen	(Germany) Uli Stein; (Germany) Toni Vardjavand; (Germany) Lothar Landauer; (Denmark) Kim Christofte

^{(1)} received yellow card
^{(2)} won match in extra time
