= Irish Poker Open =

Texas hold 'em tournament running since 1980

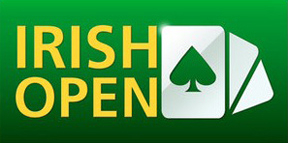
Irish Poker Open Logo

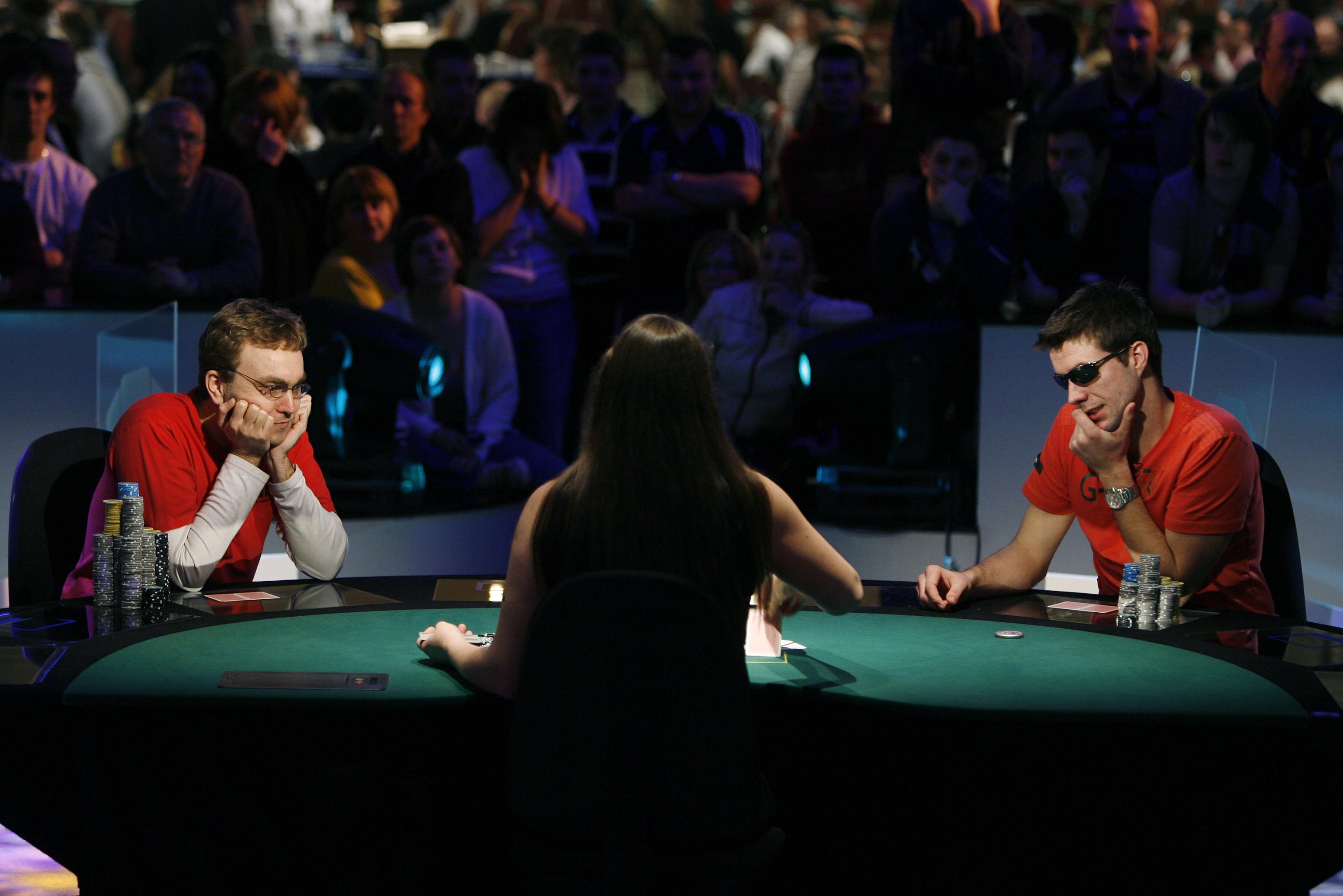
Neil Channing, 2008 Irish Open Champion, headsup at the final table with Donal Norton (right)

The Irish Poker Open is the longest running No Limit Texas hold 'em poker tournament in Europe and second longest in the world after the World Series of Poker.

First organized in 1980 by Terry Rogers, an Irish bookmaker, the event now attracts thousands of players every year and is considered a major fixture on the international poker calendar. It is traditionally held over the Easter weekend and prides itself on its friendly atmosphere, range of different poker tournaments and the chance for players to have fun, enjoy the craic and sample some of Dublin's hospitality.

After Terry Rogers' death in 1999 the tournament, originally held in Dublin's Eccentric Club, was subsequently hosted by tournament director and poker player Liam Flood and the Merrion Casino. Bookmaker Paddy Power began sponsorship of the event in 2005 and oversaw a period of huge growth. By 2006 the event, with 339 players, had outgrown the Merrion Casino and was held in Jury's Ballsbridge Hotel in Dublin. In 2007 the venue was changed to the Burlington Hotel, Dublin to accommodate the bigger fields, while in 2008 and 2009 the Irish Open venue was Citywest Hotel, Dublin. In 2010 the tournament returned to the Burlington Hotel but numbers were declining, in line with trends and decline in the online poker industry. Liam Flood died in 2014; The Liam Flood Memorial tournament was launched in 2015 and is held in his memory every year.

In 2016, Paul O’Reilly and JP McCann – who both had extensive experience in running major poker tournaments - took over the organisation of the Irish Poker Open. They took the event back to the Citywest Hotel for a week-long festival from March 21 to 28 culminating in a €1,150 buy-in Main Event with a €500k guaranteed prize pool. Their vision for the event was a true festival of poker that would appeal to players of all kinds. Their vision was realised; the first event smashed the €500k guarantee and attracted 802 players, generating a prize pool of over €800k. Dan Wilson won the Main Event for €150,000.

The event was held online for two years during the COVID-19 pandemic but was back as a live event in 2022 and attracted a huge field of 2,040 entries. American-born professional poker player Steve O’Dwyer, who had been living in Dublin for ten years, won the first prize of €318,700 in a stunning display of poker acumen. O’Dwyer bulldozed his way to victory and single-handedly eliminated all eight of his final table opponents. O'Dwyer is immensely proud of his Irish roots and, despite 30 major tournament victories and more than $33 million in live tournament winnings to his name, he said that winning the Irish Open meant more to him than any other tournament.

The 2023 event was won by PokerStars qualifier David Docherty for €365,000 after he outlasted a record field of 2,491 players. The event, sponsored by PokerStars and Paddy Power, was held at the Royal Dublin Society from April 3–10 with more than 622 players winning their entry online.

The 2024 Irish Poker Open took place at the Royal Dublin Society in Dublin between March 25 and April 1. The 2024 Irish Open was far and away the most spectacular poker festival Ireland has ever known. The Main Event broke its own record to become the richest poker tournament ever held in Ireland with 3,233 entries and a €3,152,175 prize pool, while the €500,000 guaranteed Mini Irish Open attracted 5,320 entries to become Ireland's largest ever tournament. The record-breaking Main Event was won by Finland's Tero Laurila for €292,685.

The 2025 Irish Poker Open festival will be taking place from April 10 to April 21 at the Royal Dublin Society and includes an extra four days added to the schedule. A total of €5,000,000 is on offer in guaranteed prize pools with a €2,500,000 guarantee for the Main Event and a €1,000,000 guarantee for the Mini Irish Open. In 2024, the Mini Irish Open became the biggest poker tournament ever held in Ireland in 2024 with 5,000+ entries. There will also be a brand new €1,000,000 guaranteed Mystery Bounty event and a new €500,000 guaranteed Super High Roller tournament.

== Origins ==
Terry Rogers once declared "I have been the greatest single factor in the worldwide spread of competitive poker."

One of his most enduring legacies was founding the Irish Open. In the late 1970s Terry started to hold poker tournaments for charity under the auspices of the Eccentric Club. According to Liam Flood, a fellow bookmaker and friend of Terry's the games would get "anywhere between 100 and 300 players playing five-card draw for £100 to £200 per game. That was a lot of people for that kind of money at the time. Every year Terry would go to America on business. In May 1979 he had a few days off and went to Las Vegas. He saw this high stakes poker game going on and met Benny Binion and the rest is history."

Always one to spot an opportunity Rogers cemented his relationship with Binion and his band of high-rolling players by taking bets from them on the outcome of the games, offering the type of long odds the Americans had never seen before.

"Guys like Benny Binion, Doyle Brunson and Chip Reese really held Terry in high esteem," states World Series of Poker bracelet winner and former Irish Olympic swimmer Donnacha O'Dea. "He'd give them great odds, better than any American bookie would give, but he still made sure he had a 20% edge."

After the 1979 World Series Terry returned to Ireland enthused about what he'd seen. Stud and draw were the poker variants of choice in Ireland but the new variation he'd seen in Vegas, no-limit hold'em, beat them all for excitement and skill.

In the following years he returned to Vegas for the World Series with Liam Flood but his bookmaking activities brought the attention of the Las Vegas Police Department and on one occasion Terry and Liam ended up being arrested and imprisoned. The irony of being jailed for gambling in Vegas was not lost on them according to Flood.

== Development ==
The Irish Open was organised under the auspices of the charity fundraising organisation started by Terry called the Eccentric Club. It attracted mainly local players but Rogers already had his eye on expanding the event.

Donnacha O'Dea remembers the stunts Rogers pulled to generate interest in the Irish Open. "He'd publicise betting on the tournament in the Racing Post along with an event such as the Super Bowl so he could get around the law on advertising such events. He'd install an outsider such as 'Suitcase' Johnny as favourite. Poker players would then see these odds and think to themselves, 'Well I'm much better than this guy who's favourite' and immediately want to take part in the tournament."

The Irish Open fell into abeyance in the early 1990s as Terry concentrated on nursing his mother through ill health. It was resurrected again in the mid-1990s.

== Relationship with the World Series of Poker ==
Terry's annual trips to Las Vegas and the success of the first Irish Open led to the US players he had befriended at the World Series of Poker repaying their debt of gratitude for his generous bookmaking services by making a rare excursion from their home soil to play in Ireland in 1982 and 1983.

Donnacha and Liam remember the American invasions with glee. "One year Terry got them a yellow Rolls-Royce for when they arrived at the airport. Another year he arrived with a white horse which Amarillo Slim, who was a real horseman, rode out of the airport.

"Those years he had Tom McEvoy, Jack Keller, Stu Ungar, Doyle Brunson, Chip Reese, and Perry Green from Alaska. It was funny to see them try to pay for goods in Killiney village with chips from Terry's poker tournament, something they were used to doing in Vegas."

== Irish Open 2007 ==
The Irish Poker Open 2007 Main Event had a guaranteed prize pool of €2 million – twice the €1 million guarantee of 2006 but with a then-European record 708 players the prize pool swelled to more than €2.3 million.

The final table of six was made up of four Irishmen, an Englishman and a Canadian. The winner, Belfast man Marty Smyth, took home the €650,000 first prize after a two-hour heads-up battle against World Poker Tour and European Poker Tour winner Roland De Wolfe. Successful online player Sorel Mizzi from Toronto finished third ahead of Irishmen Danny McHugh (4th), Brian O'Keeffe (5th) and Nicky Power (6th).

== Irish Open 2008 ==
The Irish Poker Open 2008 was held at Citywest Hotel, Dublin and a field of 667 took part in the main event. Notable players included poker legend Doyle Brunson, his son Todd Brunson, Sorel Mizzi, Roland De Wolfe, Padraig Parkinson, World Series of Poker bracelet-winner Ciaran O'Leary, Dario Minieri and dozens of other poker professionals. Paddy Power Poker added €200,000 to the prize pool, which took it past the €3 million mark.

English poker pro Neil Channing won €801,400 and the Irish Open title after defeating local favourite Donal Norton of Tipperary heads up. Norton took home €420,000 for his 2nd-place finish. Thomas Dunwoodie finished in 3rd place ahead of Tim Blake (4th), Kai Danilo Paulsen (5th) and Edwin Tournier (6th). Channing added £50,000 to his winnings by putting a £500 bet on himself at 100/1 with Paddy Power at the midpoint of the four-day tournament.

== Irish Open 2009 ==
The Irish Open 2009 returned to Citywest Hotel, Dublin, the venue for the 2008 Irish Open. A larger-than-expected field of 700 played in the main event, including famous faces such as Phil Laak, Jennifer Tilly, Neil Channing, Marty Smyth, Andy Black, Jamie Gold, Dan Harrington, Juha Helppi, Roland De Wolfe and Ciaran O'Leary.

Swedish poker professional Christer Johansson won the title and €600,000, with Kara Scott finishing in second place for €312,600.

== Irish Open 2010 ==
The Irish Open 2010 returned to Burlington Hotel, Dublin, where the Irish Open had been hosted three years previously. A field of 708 played in the main event, including such celebrities as Irish soccer hero Tony Cascarino, former Manchester United star Teddy Sheringham, rugby legend Reggie Corrigan and former snooker world champion Ken Doherty. Many well-known poker players took part, including Padraig Parkinson, Liam Flood, Sandra Naujoks, Dario Minieri, Neil Channing, Marty Smyth and former World Series of Poker champions Noel Furlong and Dan Harrington.

Twenty-year-old Englishman James Mitchell won the title and €600,000 first prize, with Paul Carr from Limerick finishing in second place for €312,600. Rob Sherwood become the €100,000 Sole Survivor by outlasting all other paddypowerpoker.com qualifiers; he won an additional €163,300 for finishing in fourth position.

== Irish Open 2011 ==
The 2011 Irish Open Main Event was won by Irishman Niall Smyth who won a €550,000 first prize. He beat experienced Englishman Surinder Sunar heads up. Sunar received €290,000 for his second-place finish.

== Irish Open 2012 ==
The 2012 Irish Open Main Event was won by Belgian professional Kevin Vandersmissen, who won €420,000 for first prize. Vandersmissen beat German player Thomas Beer heads up to take first place.

== Irish Open 2013 ==
The 2013 Irish Open Main event saw the past year's fourth-place finisher, Ian Simpson, take first place, and a prize of €265,000. The noticeably smaller first place payout was due to the buy in for this year's event being dropped from €3,500 to €2,250. Following his win Simpson proposed to his girlfriend.

== Irish Open 2022 ==
Following the lifting of government imposed COVID restrictions in Ireland, the tournament organizers announced that the 2022 Irish Poker Open will take place at the Citywest Hotel in Dublin, between April 11 and April 18, 2022.

== Irish Open 2023 ==
The 2023 Irish Poker Open took place at the Royal Dublin Society in Dublin between April 3 and April 10, 2023. The event was won by Scottish professional David Docherty for €365,000 after he outlasted a record-breaking field of 2,491 entries.

== Irish Open 2024 ==
The 2024 Irish Poker Open took place at the Royal Dublin Society in Dublin between March 25 and April 1. The record-breaking event was won by Finnish player Tero Laurila for a first prize of €292,685. The 2024 Irish Open was far and away the most spectacular poker festival Ireland has ever known. The Main Event broke its own record to become the richest poker tournament ever held in Ireland with 3,233 entries and a €3,152,175 prize pool, while the €500,000 guaranteed Mini Irish Open attracted 5,320 entries to become Ireland's largest ever tournament.

== Irish Open 2025 ==
After four days of play at the Royal Dublin Society, Simon Wilson had come out on top in the 4,562-entry €1,150 Irish Open Main Event, winning €600,000 from the €4,447,950 prize pool. The biggest ever Irish poker tournament paid 671 places and ran alongside a schedule of side events of similar scale, including the €1,000,000 guaranteed Mini Main and the largest Mystery Bounty event held in Ireland.

== Irish Open 2026 ==
The 2026 Irish Open schedule featured a wide range of events, including a Mystery Bounty tournament with a €485 + €150 + €515 buy-in and a €1,000,000 guarantee, played with a 50,000 starting stack and 20-minute levels. The Main Event had a €1,000 + €150 buy-in and a €2,500,000 guaranteed prize pool, using a 50,000 starting stack and 45-minute levels. The schedule also included the H.O.R.S.E. Championship, 2-to-7 Single Draw, the 6-Max Championship, the Mixed 8-Game Championship, and a PLO High Roller 8-Max event. Additional tournaments include the No Limit Hold'em Ladies Championship (€215 + €35, 25,000 starting stack, 30-minute levels) and the Mini Irish Open with a €215 + €35 buy-in and a €1,000,000 guarantee.

== International expansion ==
During the 2026 Irish Open, organisers announced that the event would expand internationally, with stops outside Ireland planned for 2026 and early 2027. The confirmed events are:

- Sydney – 6–15 September 2026, at the Poker Palace. The main event carries an A$1,000,000 guarantee with a A$2,000 buy-in.
- Marrakech – 10–15 November 2026, at the Casino de Marrakech. The main event carries a €500,000 guarantee with a €1,150 buy-in.
- United States – early 2027. No specific venue, city or buy-in was announced.

== Results ==
Date	Event / City	Players	Prize Pool	Winner	Prize	Results
2026; 26 March-6 April	(Republic of Ireland) Irish Poker Open 2026 €1,150; Royal Dublin Society, Dublin	5,003	€4,852,910	(Romania) Narcis Nedelcu	€336,798	
2025; 10-21 April	(Republic of Ireland) Irish Poker Open 2025 €1,150; Royal Dublin Society, Dublin	4,562	€4,447,950	(Republic of Ireland) Simon Wilson	€600,000	
2024; 26 March-1 April	(Republic of Ireland) Irish Poker Open 2024 €1,150; Royal Dublin Society, Dublin	3,233	€3,152,175	(Finland) Tero Laurila	€292,685*	
2023; 5-10 April	(Republic of Ireland) Irish Poker Open 2023 €1,150; Royal Dublin Society, Dublin	2,491	€2,428,725	(Scotland) David Docherty	€365,000	
2022; 13-18 April	(Republic of Ireland) Irish Poker Open 2022 €1,150; Citywest Hotel, Dublin	2,040	€1,989,000	(United States) Steve O'Dwyer	€318,700	
2021; 28 March-7 April	OnLine Irish Poker Open 2021 €1,100; Online at partypoker due COVID-19 pandemic	1,880	€1,880,000	(Ukraine) Pavel Veksler	€265,999	
2020; 6-12 April	OnLine Irish Poker Open 2020 €1,100; Online at partypoker due COVID-19 pandemic	2,954	€2,945,000	(Brazil) Pablo Silva	€462,099	
2019; 17-22 April	(Republic of Ireland) Irish Poker Open 2019 €1,150; Citywest Hotel, Dublin	1,807	€1,805,870	(Republic of Ireland) Weijie Zheng	€300,000	
2018; 14-18 March	(Republic of Ireland) Irish Poker Open 2018 & Norwegian Championships €1,275; Citywest Hotel, Dublin	1,340	€1,347,164	(England) Ryan Mandara	€210,000	
2017; 30 March-3 April	(Republic of Ireland) Irish Poker Open 2017 & Norwegian Championships €1,275; Citywest Hotel, Dublin	1,129	€1,128,295	(Canada) Griffin Benger	€200,000	
2016; 24-28 March	(Republic of Ireland) Irish Poker Open 2016 €1,150; Citywest Hotel, Dublin	802	€801,500	(Republic of Ireland) Daniel Wilson	€150,000	
2015; 3-6 April	(Republic of Ireland) PaddyPower Irish Poker Open 2015 €3,500; Double Tree by Hilton, Dublin	321	€1,027,000	(Greece) Ioannis Triantafyllakis	€209,500 +€50,000	
2014; 18-21 April	(Republic of Ireland) PaddyPower Irish Poker Open 2014 €2,250; Double Tree by Hilton, Dublin	411	€822,000	(Republic of Ireland) Patrick Clarke	€200,000 +€50,000	
2013; 29 March-1 April	(Republic of Ireland) PaddyPower Irish Poker Open 2013 €2,250; Double Tree by Hilton, Dublin	505	€1,010,000	(England) Ian Simpson	€265,000	
2012; 6-9 April	(Republic of Ireland) PaddyPower Irish Poker Open 2012 €3,500; Double Tree by Hilton, Dublin	502	€1,606,400	(Belgium) Kevin Vandersmissen	€420,000	
2011; 22-25 April	(Republic of Ireland) PaddyPower Irish Poker Open 2011 €3,500; Double Tree by Hilton, Dublin	615	€1,968,000	(Republic of Ireland) Niall Smyth	€550,000 +€100,000	
2010; 2-5 April	(Republic of Ireland) PaddyPower Irish Poker Open 2010 €3,500; Double Tree by Hilton, Dublin	708	€2,265,200	(England) James Mitchell	€600,000 +€100,000	
2009; 10-13 April	(Republic of Ireland) PaddyPower Irish Poker Open 2009 €3,500; Citywest Hotel, Dublin	700	€2,240,000	(Sweden) Christer Johansson	€600,000	
2008; 20-24 March	(Republic of Ireland) PaddyPower Irish Poker Open 2008 €4,500; Citywest Hotel, Dublin	667	€3,000,000	(England) Neil Channing	€801,400	
2007; 6-9 April	(Republic of Ireland) PaddyPower Irish Poker Open 2007 €3,500; Double Tree by Hilton, Dublin	708	€2,336,500	(Republic of Ireland) Marty Smyth	€650,000	
2006; 15-17 April	(Republic of Ireland) PaddyPower Irish Poker Open 2006 €3,200; Jurys Hotel Ballsbridge, Dublin	350	€1,000,000	(Republic of Ireland) Vincent Melinn	€300,000	
2005; 26-27 March	(Republic of Ireland) PaddyPower Irish Poker Open 2005 €2,150; Citywest Hotel, Dublin	174	€368,000	(England) John Falconer	€146,000	
2004; 8-11 April	(Republic of Ireland) PaddyPower Irish Poker Open 2004 €1,600; The Merrion Casino Club, Dublin	107	€170,500	(Republic of Ireland) Ivan Donaghy	€65,800	
2003; 17-20 April	(Republic of Ireland) PaddyPower Irish Poker Open 2003 €1,060; The Merrion Casino Club, Dublin	126	€126,000	(England) Joe Beevers	€50,375	
2002; 30 May-2 June	(Republic of Ireland) Irish Poker Open 2002 €770; The Merrion Casino Club, Dublin	66	€46,200	(Republic of Ireland) Nick Beirne	€19,800	
2001; 10-15 April	(Republic of Ireland) Irish Poker Open 2001 I£660; The Merrion Casino Club, Dublin	114	I£68,400	(Republic of Ireland) Jenny Hegarty	I£28,045	
2000; 20-23 April	(Republic of Ireland) Irish Poker Open 2000 I£660; The Merrion Casino Club, Dublin	90	I£53,340	(Republic of Ireland) Alan Betson	I£22,140	
1999; 3-5 April	(Republic of Ireland) Irish Poker Open 1999 I£250; Eccentric Club, Dublin	186	I£46,500	(Republic of Ireland) Liam Barker	I£19,065	
1998; 11-13 April	(Republic of Ireland) Irish Poker Open 1998; Eccentric Club, Dublin			(Republic of Ireland) Mickey Finn		
1996; 6-7 April	(Republic of Ireland) Irish Poker Open 1996; Eccentric Club, Dublin			(Republic of Ireland) Liam Flood		
1995; March	(Republic of Ireland) Irish Poker Open 1995; Eccentric Club, Dublin					
1994; 2-4 April	(Republic of Ireland) Irish Poker Open 1994 I£550; D1 Club, Dublin	60	I£30,000	(Republic of Ireland) Mickey Finn	I£15,000	
1993; 10-12 April	(Republic of Ireland) Irish Poker Open 1993; Eccentric Club, Dublin			(Republic of Ireland) Christie Smith		
1992 tbc	(Republic of Ireland) Irish Poker Open 1992; Eccentric Club, Dublin					
1991; 30-31 March	(Republic of Ireland) Irish Poker Open 1991; Eccentric Club, Dublin					
1990; 15 April	(Republic of Ireland) Irish Poker Open 1990; Eccentric Club, Dublin			(Republic of Ireland) Colette Doherty		
1989; 30-31 March	(Republic of Ireland) Irish Poker Open 1989; Eccentric Club, Dublin			(Republic of Ireland) Noel Furlong		
1988; 2-3 April	(Republic of Ireland) Irish Poker Open 1988; Eccentric Club, Dublin			(Republic of Ireland) Jimmy Langan		
1987; 18-19 April	(Republic of Ireland) Irish Poker Open 1987; Eccentric Club, Dublin			(Republic of Ireland) Noel Furlong		
1986; 29-30 March	(Republic of Ireland) Irish Poker Open 1986; Eccentric Club, Dublin			(Republic of Ireland) Bryan McCarthy		
1985; 6-7 April	(Republic of Ireland) Irish Poker Open 1985; Eccentric Club, Dublin			(Republic of Ireland) Irene Tier	£22,775	
1984; 21-22 April	(Republic of Ireland) Irish Poker Open 1984 I£1,000; Killiney Castle, Dublin			(United States) Tony Byrne		
1983; 2-3 April	(Republic of Ireland) Irish Poker Open 1983; Eccentric Club, Dublin			(Republic of Ireland) Jimmy Langan		
1982; 10-11 April	(Republic of Ireland) Irish Poker Open 1982; Eccentric Club, Dublin			(Republic of Ireland) Frank Conway		
1981; 10-11 April	(Republic of Ireland) Irish Poker Open 1981; Eccentric Club, Dublin			(United States) Sean Kelly	I£13,600	
1980; 5-6 April	(Republic of Ireland) Irish Poker Open 1980; Eccentric Club, Dublin			(Republic of Ireland) Colette Doherty		
