= Christer Johansson (poker player) =

Swedish poker player (born 1970)

- Nickname: None
- Born: Lars Christer Johansson; 30 July 1970 (age 56); Stockholm, Sweden

World Series of Poker
- Bracelet: None
- Money finishes: 3
- Highest WSOP Main Event finish: None

World Poker Tour
- Title: 1
- Final tables: 2
- Money finishes: 3

European Poker Tour
- Title: None
- Final table: 1
- Money finishes: 4

Lars Christer Johansson (born 30 July 1970 in Stockholm) is a Swedish professional sports bettor and poker player, based in Malmö.

Johansson started by playing draw poker with his family, but now concentrates on texas hold 'em.

Johansson defeated "Rocky" Ross Boatman to win the ATS 1,000,000 first prize at the 2000 Vienna Spring Festival and went on to cash in the World Series of Poker for the first time in his poker career in 2002.

In February 2003, Johansson won the World Poker Tour (WPT) first season Grand Prix de Paris event, taking home the €500,000 first prize after defeating a final table including Allen Cunningham and Tony G.

In September 2005, Johansson finished 2nd in the European Poker Tour (EPT) second season Barcelona Open, outlasting both Patrik Antonius and Gus Hansen at the final table.

In April 2009, Johansson won the Irish Poker Open, after defeating Kara Scott heads-up to take home the €600,000 first prize.

Johansson has also appeared in the World Heads-Up Poker Championship and the William Hill Poker Grand Prix.

As of 2008, his total live tournament winnings exceed $1,300,000.

Johansson was one of the owners of the online poker site Pokerducks.
