= Jimmy Fricke =

American poker player (born 1987)

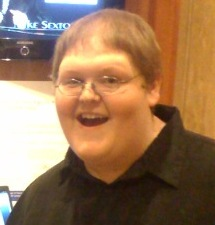
- Nickname: Gobboboy
- Born: April 19, 1987 (age 39)

World Series of Poker
- Bracelet: None
- Money finishes: 15
- Highest WSOP Main Event finish: 303, 2016

World Poker Tour
- Title: None
- Final table: None
- Money finish: 1

Jimmy Fricke (born April 19, 1987) is a professional poker player from Mahomet, Illinois.

In 2005 Fricke dropped out of college to play full-time Internet poker under the screen name "Gobboboy". At age 19, he started on the live poker scene, cashing in two major events within eight days. He took 22nd place at the PokerStars Caribbean Adventure in the Bahamas and subsequently ended runner up to Gus Hansen at the Aussie Millions in Melbourne, Australia. This finish won him nearly $800,000.

Fricke cashed in the World Series of Poker Europe 2007 HORSE event, temporarily holding the record for the youngest player to ever cash at a WSOP event. His record was broken by Annette Obrestad a few days later.

As of 2020, Fricke's total live tournament winnings exceed $1,700,000.
