= Roy Brindley =

English poker player (born 1969)

- Nickname: The Boy
- Born: 10 June 1969 (age 57); Southampton, England

World Series of Poker
- Money finishes: 3

European Poker Tour
- Money finishes: 3

Roy "The Boy" Brindley (born 10 June 1969 in Southampton) is an English professional poker player, now living in Wicklow, Ireland.

== Early years ==
Brindley attended St Mary's Independent School, Southampton.

Before his poker career, Brindley was involved in greyhound racing, and worked in a kennels near Dorking at the age of 17, then moving to other kennels in Lincolnshire and Essex before moving to Andover, where he was a professional greyhound trainer from 1991 to 1995.

Brindley moved to America in 1995 to continue training greyhounds, but moved back soon after. Following some personal crises Brindley ended up living on the street.

Following spells as a TV presenter for regional TV (Town TV, Andover), freelance journalist and as a magazine editor (Greyhound Monthly Magazine), he took up poker playing on arrival in Ireland in 2001.

== Poker career ==
After seeing a documentary on Noel Furlong winning the 1999 World Series of Poker (WSOP), Brindley took up poker in early 2001.

In 2002, Brindley won seven ranking tournaments, and finished second to Kirill Gerasimov in the World Heads-Up Poker Championship (WHUPC). At the time of the WHUPC, Brindley had so little cash that he couldn't afford a taxi home and had to walk back to his hotel every night of the tournament. Yet, after finishing second, Brindley was distraught and came close to throwing his €40,000 winnings out of the hotel window.

Brindley also finished third in the 2005 William Hill Poker Grand Prix, second in the Masterclassics of Poker Omaha event in 2006, second in the Paris Open of Poker in 2007 and won the televised Betfair Poker Masters of Europe in 2007. As for titles no Player has won more European ranking tournaments than him despite his relatively short career.

In addition to his playing career, Brindley regularly commentated on SKY Sports' Poker Million and acted as an industry spokesman. He is a regular columnist for Card Player Magazine and works as a poker journalist for various newspapers.

His autobiography, Life's a Gamble, was published on 26 February 2009 by Transworld-Penguin. It has a 4-star rating on Amazon.ie and received positive reviews from the Irish Times and other publications.

As of 2008, his total live poker tournament winnings exceed $850,000.

From the Spring of 2012 Brindley has acted as the resident F1 betting expert on At The Races. In July 2013 he appeared on Calvin Ayre TV where he announced he was in legal litigation with his sponsors of nine years, Ladbrokes, for their cessation of affiliate payments and breach of contract.

In the mid-late 2010's Brindley wrote for BetVictor's and Gambling.com's blogs. He has made the odd foray back into poker. In 2017 he beat 1,238 rivals to land the LS30 Series in Dublin. He also represented Ireland at the Match Poker European Nations Cup in Kyiv, Ukraine, in 2019 where his team finished second. In 2025 he chalked-up an additional €28,000 in winnings in events in Dublin and Amsterdam.

A full-time columnist for iGaming.com in the early 2020s, he is now a stakeholder and driving force in Sweepmate.app. Roy is also a hobbyist YouTuber with his videos featuring travel and pub visits under the alias RoyOnTheRoad.
