= Ciarán O'Leary =

Irish poker player (born 1973)

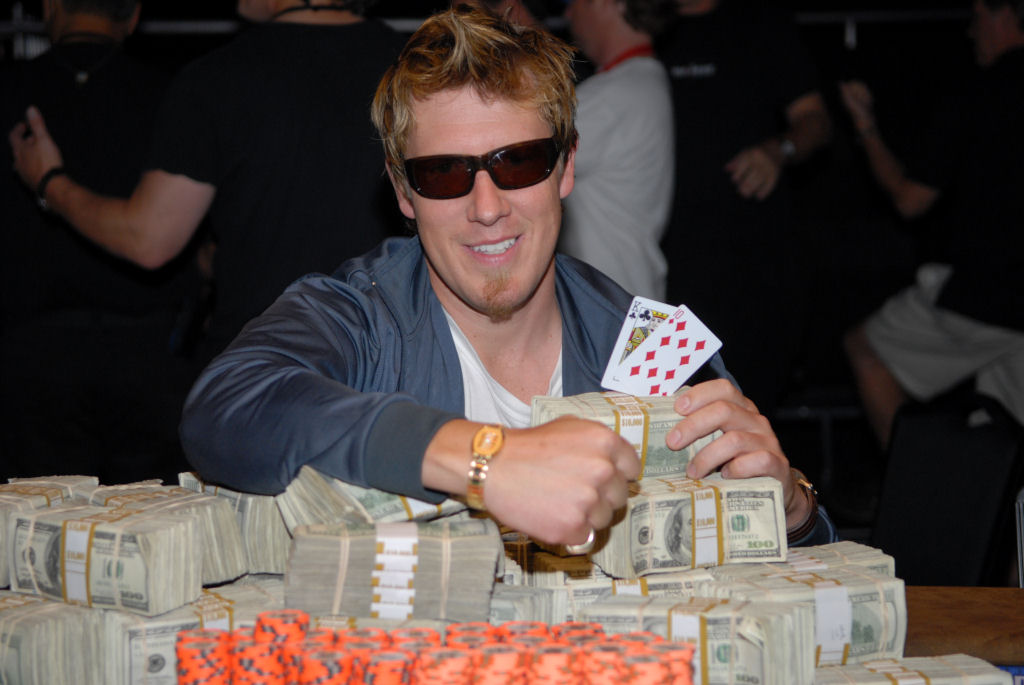
- O'Leary after winning the $1,500 No-Limit Texas Hold'em event at the 2007 World Series of Poker
- Nickname: Big C
- Born: 27 October 1973 (age 53); Ireland

World Series of Poker
- Bracelet: 1
- Money finish: 1

Ciarán O'Leary (born 27 October 1973) is an Irish professional poker player who resides in Seattle, Washington.

== Early life ==
O'Leary grew up in modest conditions in Carrigaline, County Cork, Ireland. The son of a greyhound trainer, Terry O'Leary, and his wife, Sheila, he is one of three children. Much of his childhood was spent accompanying his father anywhere from different "Point to Point" Horse track events, the Cork Greyhound Track, and to the various betting shops across County Cork, where he would often be found in the corner observing the games.

== Poker career ==
O'Leary arrived in the United States as a young rounder in 1997 with $1,000 in his pocket. His first night stateside was spent in a poker game at a Boston pub where he won $3,000. He then traveled cross country, via Amtrak, ending up in San Francisco, where he quickly made his mark in the San Francisco Bay Area poker scene, developing a winning reputation at Lucky Chances, taking down numerous titles. It was there that the moniker "Big C" was tagged in lieu of the constant mispronunciation of his name.

O'Leary's biggest win came at the 2007 World Series of Poker when he won Event #3. The $1,500 No Limit Hold'em event attracted 2,998 participants, which at the time was the biggest live tournament in Poker history outside of the 2005 and 2006 Main Events, with the victory earning O'Leary his first bracelet and $727,012. The event was nationally televised on ESPN.

In 2008 O'Leary was selected to play on the Irish team in The Poker Nations Cup. He played in the final heat, composed of Roland DeWolfe, Marcel Lüske, Robert Williamson III, Benjamin Kang, and William Thorson. He finished second in the heat and Ireland would eventually end up finishing second to Great Britain.

In 2008 O'Leary joined Paddy Power as the company's brand ambassador and sponsored professional. As such, he represents the poker room at large buy-in live events, in promotional work and by writing a blog on the company website.

== World Series of Poker bracelets ==
Year	Tournament	Prize (US$)
2007	$1,500 Event #3 No Limit Hold'em	$727,012
