= Erik Sagström =

Swedish poker player (born 1983)

- Nicknames: Erik123, The Salmon, King of Ding

World Series of Poker
- Bracelet: None
- Money finish: 1

World Poker Tour
- Title: None
- Final table: None
- Money finishes: 2

Erik Sagström (born in Linköping in 1983) is a Swedish professional poker player. Sagström was introduced to poker accidentally while surfing the web. He began to play at ParadisePoker at the age of 17 and has since become a successful online poker player.

Sagström plays online poker at numerous sites as The Salmon, Erik123, and DIN_FRU. Sagström was also involved in setting up the online poker cardroom PokerChamps.com with Gus Hansen and Tony Guoga.

In May 2006, Sagström played Liz Lieu in a highly publicized series of three $200,000 limit Texas hold 'em matches at The Venetian. Sagström ultimately lost the series 2-1.

Whilst Sagström has competed in events of the World Series of Poker (WSOP), World Poker Tour (WPT), and European Poker Tour (EPT), he is best known for his online poker record. His largest online tournament cash was when he won Event #4 in the 2003 World Championship of Online Poker, beating 1,357 other entrants and netting $101,850.

Sagström was also chosen by Ken Lennaárd to represent Sweden in both the Poker Nations Cup and the PartyPoker.com Football & Poker Legends Cup.

In February 2007, Erik Sagström opened his own poker site on the Boss Media network, using his nickname as the title, Erik123.com.

In the 2009 World Series of Poker, Erik finished 3rd at the $50,000 H.O.R.S.E. event.

As of 2012, his total live tournament winnings exceed $700,000.
