= Bruno Fitoussi =

French poker player (born 1958)

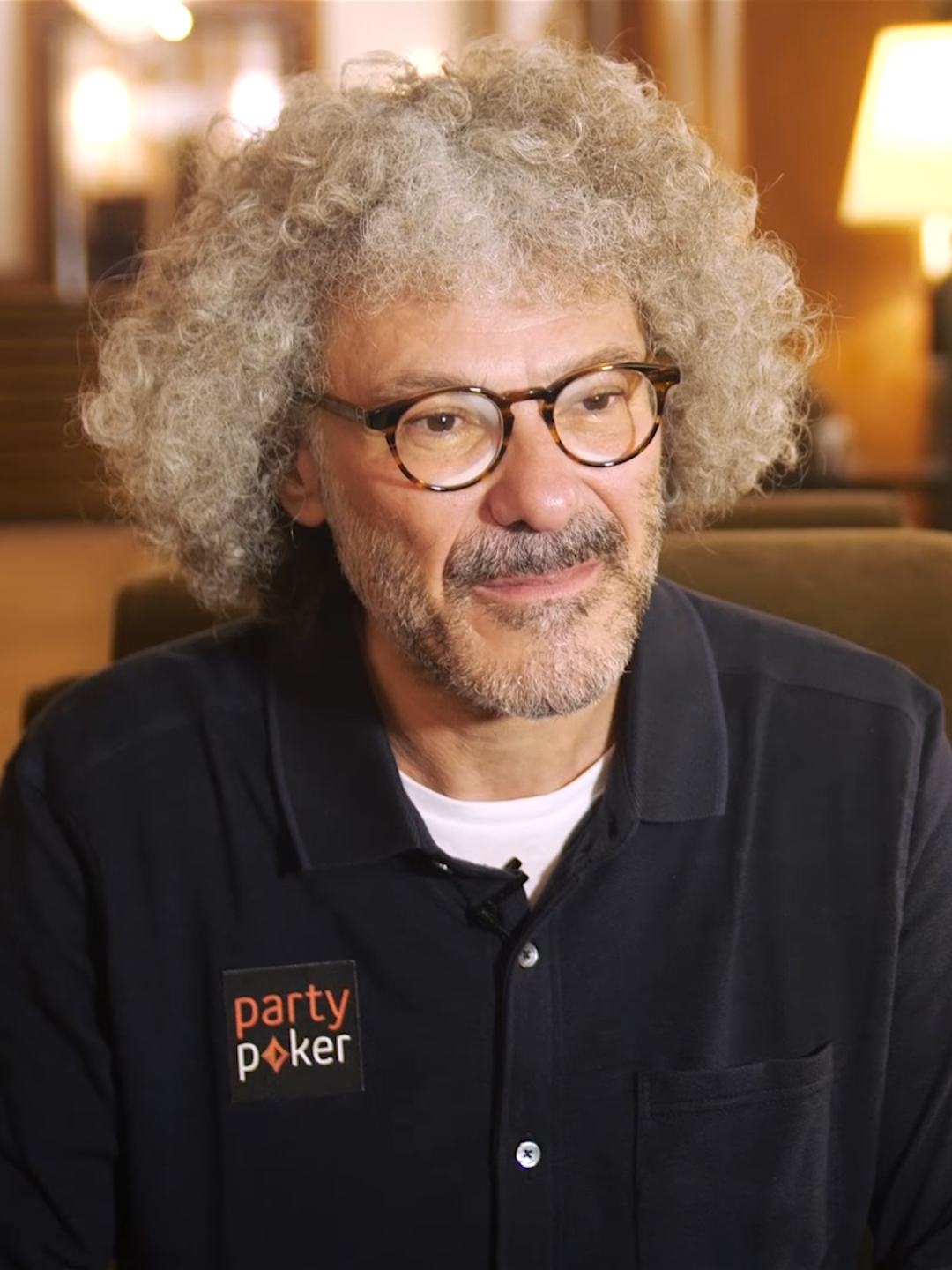
- Bruno Fitoussi, 2018
- Nickname: King
- Born: 21 September 1958 (age 68)

World Series of Poker
- Bracelet: None
- Money finishes: 8
- Highest WSOP Main Event finish: 15th, 2003

World Poker Tour
- Title: None
- Final table: None
- Money finishes: 4

Bruno Fitoussi (born 21 September 1958) is a French professional poker player from Paris.

Fitoussi's first televised poker outing was on the original poker show Late Night Poker. He finished 7th in his heat, which also featured Surinder Sunar, Peter "The Bandit" Evans and Donnacha O'Dea.

In 2001, Fitoussi won the World Heads-Up Poker Championship, defeating Amarillo Slim in the Grand Final.

In 2003, Fitoussi finished in 8th place in the first World Poker Tour (WPT) Championship. He also finished 15th in the $10,000 World Series of Poker (WSOP) Main Event.

In 2005, Fitoussi finished 2nd in the $1,500 Seven Card Razz event.

In 2007, Fitoussi finished 2nd to Freddy Deeb in the $50,000 WSOP H.O.R.S.E event, winning $1,278,720.

As of 2024, his total live tournament winnings exceed $3,500,000. His 8 cashes at the WSOP account for $1,516,167 of those winnings.
