= Kim Christofte =

Danish footballer (born 1960)

Personal information
- Full name: Kim Piitala Christofte
- Date of birth: 24 August 1960 (age 66)
- Place of birth: Copenhagen, Denmark
- Height: 1.83 m (6 ft 0 in)
- Position: Defender

Youth career
- Brønshøj
- 1978: Ølstykke
- 1978–1979: Brøndby

Senior career*
Years	Team	Apps	(Gls)
1979–1981	Brøndby	59	(8)
1981–1984	Lokeren	27	(0)
1984–1985	Brøndby	31	(4)
1985	Málaga	?	(?)
1985–1987	FC Wettingen	18	(2)
1987–1988	OB	34	(2)
1988–1992	Brøndby	80	(4)
1992–1994	1. FC Köln	43	(0)
1994	Lierse	0	(0)
1994–1995	Ølstykke	?	(?)

International career
1981	Denmark U21	1	(0)
1984–1992	Denmark	19	(1)
Medal record
Men's football
Representing Denmark
UEFA European Championship
Winner	1992 Sweden
- * Club domestic league appearances and goals

Kim Piitala Christofte (born 24 August 1960) is a Danish former professional footballer, who was part of the Denmark national football team that won the 1992 European Championship. Considered an elegant sweeper, left back or midfielder, his technique allowed him a nonchalant playing style.

== Football career ==
Christofte started playing football for the youth teams of Ølstykke FC and Brøndby IF, and was included in the Brøndby senior team in 1979. In 1981, he became the first Brøndby player to be sold for a transfer fee, when he moved to Belgian club KSC Lokeren for £16.000. There, he played alongside fellow Dane Preben Elkjær, but as Christofte's contract ran out in 1984, he returned to Brøndby.

Christofte was a part of the Brøndby team that won the first Danish League in club history, and made his national team debut in September 1984. Having played four national team games, an injury stopped him from competing at the 1986 FIFA World Cup in Mexico. He once again moved abroad to play for Spanish club CD Málaga and Switzerland's FC Wettingen, but his stays at the clubs were unsuccessful, and for the next seven years he was absent from the national side, under legendary coach Sepp Piontek. He moved back to Denmark to play for Odense Boldklub in 1987, returning to Brøndby the following year.

Under Brøndby coach Morten Olsen, the team reached the semi-finals in the 1990–91 UEFA Cup, and Christofte was once again called up for the national team, now coached by Richard Møller Nielsen. He was selected to compete at UEFA Euro 1992. Despite his relative international inexperience (although 31), he would appear full-time in all five Danish matches in the tournament, as Denmark won the trophy. In his most memorable international moment, Christofte converted the final shot in the semi-final penalty shootout against the Netherlands, with a very short run-up, to secure Denmark a place in the final.

Following the tournament, Christofte moved abroad again, playing for 1. FC Köln in the German League. He suffered from injuries in his first season, and when he was dropped from the team by new team manager Morten Olsen, in the 1994 spring, Christofte used a release clause in his contract to leave the club a year earlier, in June. He moved on to Belgian club SK Lierse, but only played a single friendly match before family reasons prompted him to return to Denmark. His contract with Lierse was mutually terminated, which spelled the end of Christofte's professional career. He went back to play with his childhood amateur club Ølstykke FC, in the Danish second level.

== Other ventures ==
In 2006, Christofte was a member of the winning Danish team in the PartyPoker.com Football & Poker Legends Cup, alongside poker professionals Gus Hansen and Theo Jørgensen. The side defeated France, Ireland and the United States, on the way to a final success over Germany.

== Honours ==
- Danish League: 1985, 1990, 1991
- European Championship: 1992
