= Alexander Kostritsyn =

Russian poker player (born 1986)

- Nicknames: joiso (on PokerStars); PostflopAction (on Full Tilt Poker)
- Born: 1986 (age 39–40)

World Series of Poker
- Bracelet: None
- Final tables: 4
- Money finishes: 19
- Highest WSOP Main Event finish: 52nd, 2010

European Poker Tour
- Title: None
- Final table: None
- Money finish: 1

Alexander Kostritsyn (born 1986) is a Russian professional poker player considered among the best online cash game players in the world. Kostritsyn plays under the alias joiso on PokerStars and PostflopAction on Full Tilt Poker.

In 2010, Kostritsyn won Event No. 9 at the PokerStars World Championship of Online Poker for $269,284. Kostritsyn described winning $2.7 million online in 2013 as not a big winning streak for the stakes being played.

Kostritsyn won the 2008 Aussie Millions Main Event for $1,450,396 defeating WSOP bracelet winner Erik Seidel heads up. As of 2015, his total live tournament winnings exceed $3,000,000.
