= Paul Jackson (poker player) =

English poker player

- Nickname: ActionJack

World Series of Poker
- Bracelet: None
- Money finishes: 4
- Highest WSOP Main Event finish: 183rd, 2004

European Poker Tour
- Title: None
- Final table: None
- Money finish: 1

Paul Jackson is an English professional poker player from Birmingham.

== Early years ==
Prior to poker, Jackson worked as a tax manager for a Chartered Accountant.

== Poker career ==
Jackson started off playing brag and later played blackjack and roulette in casinos. At one casino, he saw poker being played and picked up the game in 1985, choosing a nickname based on the Carl Weathers film Action Jackson.

Jackson is best known as an online poker player (he once won two large online poker tournaments in the same night), but has also made numerous high finishes in major live events.

Jackson had intended to play in the 2005 London Open event, but had already booked a holiday that coincided. He went on to call Iwan Jones, whom he knew from playing online at Ladbrokes and bought a third of his action along with Nick Gibson. Jones won the $750,000 first prize, resulting in Jackson making $250,000 whilst in a caravan in Dorchester.

Jackson made a strong finish in the 2005 Monte Carlo Millions event. One hand from the event, where Phil Ivey's Q♥ 8♥ and Jackson's 6♠ 5♦ bluffed against each other continuously is considered to be one of the best hands of poker broadcast on television. Jackson also pointed out that Ivey stared him down for 7 minutes during the hand, which was edited out of the televised version. In the final hand, Jackson moved all-in with Q♥ J♥ and Ivey called with K♣ Q♦. The board of T♥ 6♣ 9♣ 2♠ 5♠ failed to improve either players' hand, and Jackson was eliminated in second place, for $600,000.

Jackson finished in the money of the World Heads-Up Poker Championship in 2005 (final 16) and 2006 (runner-up.) Along the way he eliminated Juan Carlos Mortensen in the quarter-final and Markus Golser in the semi-final. He also finished in the money of the 2004 World Series of Poker (WSOP) main event and the European Poker Tour (EPT) second season grand final.

As of 2023, his total live tournament winnings exceed $1,900,000.

Jackson has also appeared in The Poker Godfather series, travelling around Britain giving poker players advice.

== See also ==
- Swimming with the Devilfish by Des Wilson, ISBN 1-4050-8952-0
