= Jesper Hougaard =

Danish poker player (born 1983)

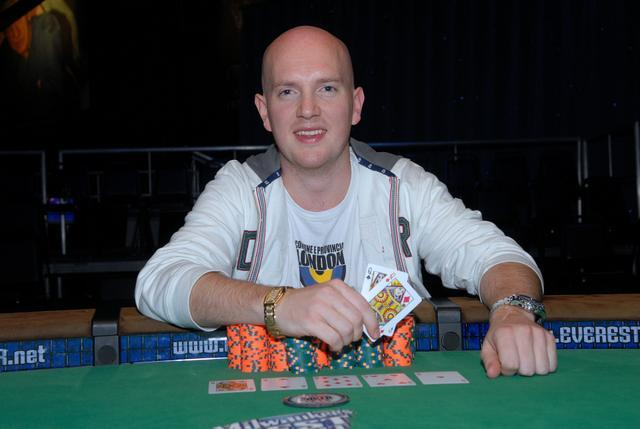
- Hougaard after winning Event #36 at the 2008 World Series of Poker
- Born: 1983 (age 42–43)

World Series of Poker
- Bracelets: 2
- Final tables: 2
- Money finishes: 9
- Highest WSOP Main Event finish: 108th, 2010

Jesper Hougaard (born 1983) is a poker player from Copenhagen, Denmark who has won two bracelets at the World Series of Poker.

Hougaard won his first World Series of Poker bracelet in a $1,500 No Limit Hold'em event in 2008. Later that same year, he won another bracelet in the £1,500 No Limit Hold'em event at the second World Series of Poker Europe in London. With his second bracelet, Hougaard became the first player to win a bracelet in Las Vegas and London.

His other poker accomplishments include a 356th-place finish in the 2007 Main Event, and a victory in the online tournament Sunday Million on PokerStars for $147,000 (April 2008).

Jesper Hougaard is co-founder of the Danish department of the international poker community Donkr.com.

Prior to becoming a professional poker player, Hougaard was a member of the National Table Tennis team in Denmark.

As of 2009, his total winnings exceed $1,000,000. His 8 cashes at the WSOP account for $970,241 of those winnings.

== World Series of Poker Bracelets ==
Year	Tournament	Prize
2008	$1,500 No Limit Hold'em	$610,304
2008E	£1,500 No Limit Hold'em	£144,218

An "E" following a year denotes bracelet(s) won at the World Series of Poker Europe
