= Colette Doherty =

Irish poker player (died 2025)

- Nickname: Collect

World Series of Poker
- Bracelet: None
- Money finish: 1
- Highest WSOP Main Event finish: None

Colette Doherty (died 22 February 2025) was an Irish poker player.

== Biography ==
In her career, she won the Irish Poker Open twice, including in its inaugural year, 1980, and again in 1991.

Doherty was also noted as the first European and first female player to play in the World Series of Poker, a position she earned through her first Irish Poker Open win, in a deal with Terry Rogers.

Doherty also made two appearances in Late Night Poker. She died on 22 February 2025.
