= Ian Frazer (poker player) =

English poker player

- Nickname: The Raiser

World Series of Poker
- Bracelet: 1
- Money finishes: 15
- Highest WSOP Main Event finish: 9

World Poker Tour
- Title: None
- Final table: 1
- Money finishes: 5

European Poker Tour
- Title: None
- Final table: None
- Money finishes: 4

Ian "The Raiser" Frazer is an English professional poker player and commentator, chiefly noted for his strong record in shootout poker tournaments. He is based in Croydon.

Frazer's shootout successes include wins in:

- the 888.com Pacific Poker Open ($500,000)
- the PartyPoker.com European Open ($125,000)
- Goalpoker.com Champions League of Poker ($175,750)

He also reached the final table of the FullTilt.net Poker Global Poker Challenge, PartyPoker.com Premier League Poker, PartyPoker.com World Open III and PartyPoker.com European Open IV. He also reached the semi-final of the 888.com UK Open IV. He reached the final table of the 2008 Late Night Poker, but was eliminated after calling Andy Black's all-in, his A 10 losing out to Black's AK. He described it as a 'poxy call' but said he made it as he thought Black looked very nervous.

Frazer has also competed in the PartyPoker.com Football & Poker Legends Cup, the Poker Million, PartyPoker.com Poker Den and cashed in the first World Series of Poker Europe main event.

As of 2023, his total live tournament winnings exceed $1,400,000.

He also regularly commentates on televised poker events.
