= Marc Karam =

Canadian poker player (born 1980)

- Karam at the 2007 World Series of Poker
- Nickname: Myst (or _myst_)
- Born: August 28, 1980 (age 46); Montreal, Quebec, Canada

World Series of Poker
- Bracelet: None
- Money finishes: 2
- Highest WSOP Main Event finish: None

World Poker Tour
- Title: None
- Final tables: 2
- Money finishes: 4

European Poker Tour
- Title: None
- Final tables: 2
- Money finishes: 3

Marc Karam (born August 28, 1980) is a Canadian professional poker player. In addition to playing in major international poker tournaments, he plays online poker.

== Poker career ==
Late in the year 2001, Karam began playing micro-stakes home games and small local tournaments. Eventually, he deposited some money online and started to build a poker bankroll. He was a fan of professional wrestling and his friends had nicknamed him "Myst", short for "Mysterio" after his favourite professional wrestler, Rey Mysterio Jr. When he began playing online he chose to play under the name, "myst". He would deposit small amounts online and play $0.50/$1.00 no limit holdem.

Over the next 5 years, he moved up in stakes and built a bankroll in excess of $100,000 (USD). In early 2006, Karam won an entry into the 2006 PokerStars Caribbean Adventure (PSCA) poker tournament by qualifying online via a "satellite" tournament. Shortly after qualifying for this event, he asked for and received a six-month sabbatical from his job at Transit Glass & Aluminum. During this same sabbatical, Karam qualified for the 2006 European Poker Tour (EPT) Grand Final in Monte Carlo through another online "satellite" tournament. He placed fourth in that tournament and quit his job to become a professional poker player.

Since becoming a professional poker player, Marc has earned over $2,000,000 (USD) in major poker tournaments.

He went on to place in the money at the 4th Annual Five Star World Poker Classic and the July 21, 2006, No Limit Holdem event at the 37th Annual World Series of Poker. He then managed to place in the top 6 at the next three major tournaments he entered; The 2006 North American Poker Championship, The 2007 Aussie Millions, and The 2007 EPT Grand Final. Karam is the only professional player to have accomplished this feat.

During the 38th Annual World Series of Poker, Karam earned over $9,000 (USD) for his 33rd-place finish in the World Championship Heads-Up No Limit Hold'em event, during which he defeated 2005 NBC National Heads-Up champion Ted Forrest.

In 2010, he entered into a sponsorship deal with online poker site, Full Tilt Poker.
