= James Akenhead =

English poker player (born 1983)

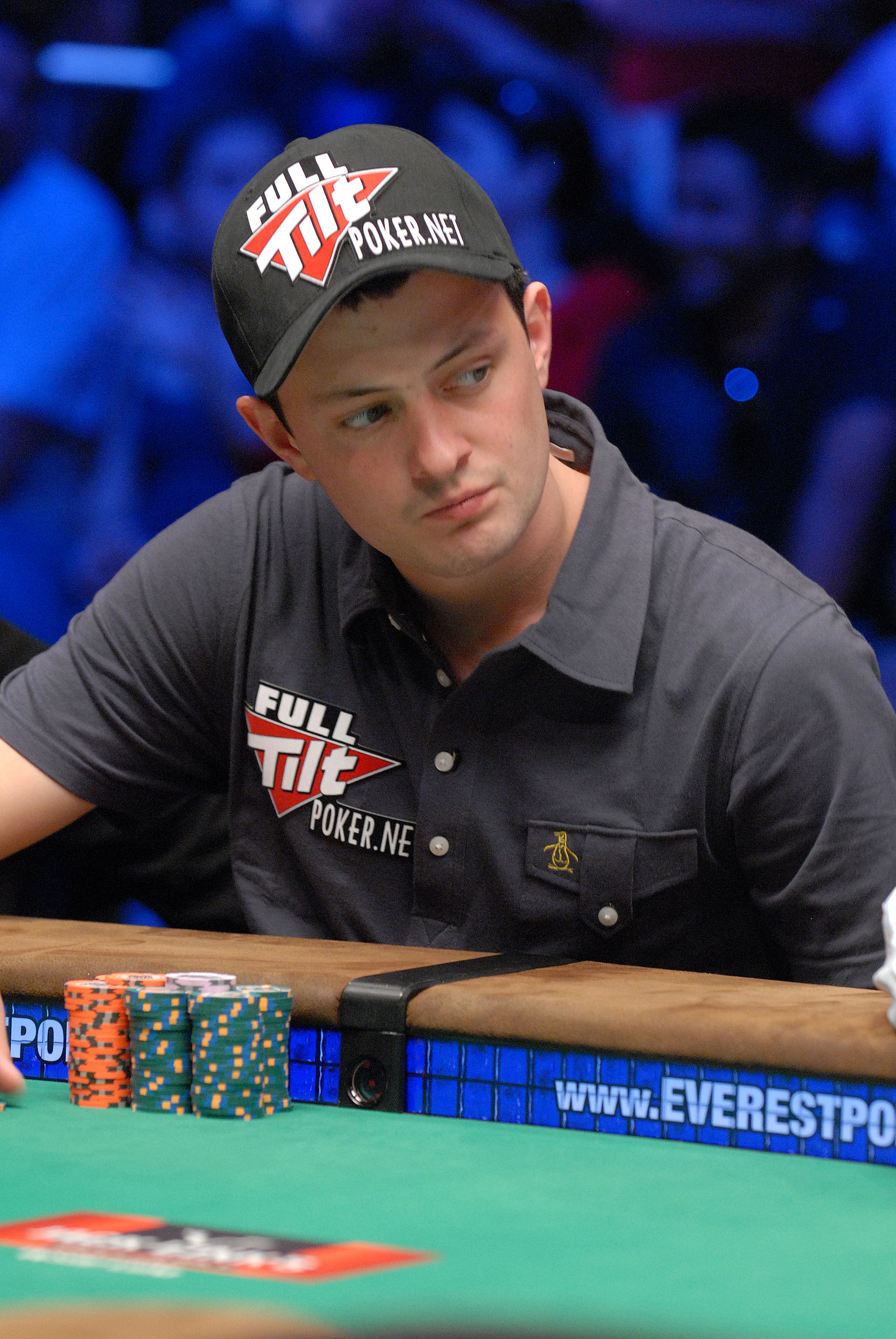
- James Akenhead at the 2009 World Series of Poker
- Nicknames: "Moka", "Sickdog", "Reader"
- Born: 6 June 1983 (age 43); London, England

World Series of Poker
- Final tables: 3
- Money finishes: 26
- Highest WSOP Main Event finish: 9th, 2009

European Poker Tour
- Money finishes: 5

James Akenhead (born 6 June 1983 in London, England) is a professional English poker player, sponsored by Genting Poker. and part of the London-based poker group The Hitsquad. He is best known for being a member of the November Nine in 2009.

== World Series of Poker ==
At the 2008 World Series of Poker, he finished runner-up to Grant Hinkle in Event #2, a $1,500 No Limit Texas hold 'em tournament. He lost the heads-up battle when he managed to provoke Hinkle to put all his chips in with 10 4, an underdog to his AK, only to see the flop come 10 10 4. The fourth 10 on the turn sealed the victory for Hinkle and Akenhead settled for second place and a $520,000 payday.

Akenhead was the only British player to reach the November Nine final table at the 2009 World Series of Poker. He started the final table with the fewest chips and was knocked out in ninth place by Kevin Schaffel. Akenhead won $1,263,602 for his performance.

In the same year, Akenhead was one of two November Nine members to reach the final table of the World Series of Poker Europe main event, the £10,000 No-Limit Hold 'Em championship, the other member being Antoine Saout. Akenhead was eliminated in ninth place, earning him £66,533 ($109,687).

== Other Poker Accomplishments ==
Akenhead is a regular on the Grosvenor U.K. Poker Tour and finished fourth in the 888.com U.K. Open in 2008 after winning two preliminary heats.

In December 2009, Akenhead won the Poker Million 8 tournament, winning $500,000 in the process.

On 22 January 2012, Akenhead playing under the screen-name Asprin1 won the Pokerstars Sunday Million for $213,750.00. The tournament began with a field of 7,125 entries.
