= Mickey Wernick =

English bookmaker and poker player (1944–2023)

- Wernick in January 2007
- Nicknames: The Worm, The Legend, Lord Wernick
- Born: Michael D. Wernick; 2 July 1944
- Died: 18 April 2023 (aged 78)

World Series of Poker
- Bracelet: None
- Money finishes: 8
- Highest WSOP Main Event finish: None

European Poker Tour
- Title: None
- Final table: None
- Money finishes: 2

Michael D. "Mickey" Wernick (2 July 1944 – 18 April 2023) was an English retired bookmaker and professional poker player from Birmingham.

Whilst growing up, Wernick was a keen amateur boxer and won the Midlands Area Amateur title.

Wernick formed a poker club in 1970 with his father Solly. He was a mainstay of the British poker scene, who eventually began traveling to the World Series of Poker. He has since cashed on 6 occasions, in no limit hold'em, razz and lowball events. In the 1986 WSOP he finished second in an Omaha event.

Wernick made the quarter-finals of the 2003 World Heads-Up Poker Championship, losing to eventual winner John Cernuto. Wernick finished on the television bubble of the European Poker Tour event in Deauville.

Wernick was ranked the #1 player across all poker variants in Europe for 2005. This led to his induction into the European Poker Players Hall of Fame as its eighth inductee, making him the oldest inductee to date.

His total live tournament winnings exceeded $1,070,000.
