= James Mitchell (poker player) =

English poker player (born 1989)

- Nicknames: Mitch, Mixed Bag
- Born: April 1989 (age 37); South London, England

World Series of Poker
- Bracelet: none
- Final table: 1
- Money finishes: 3

European Poker Tour
- Money finish: 1

James Mitchell (born 1989) is an English professional poker player from London, best known for winning the 2010 Irish Poker Open in Dublin.

Educated at King's College School in Wimbledon, Mitchell started his online poker career playing £2.50 sit-and-go tournaments using $50 in has father's Ladbrokes account as his initial stake. In an interview with Bluff Europe magazine Mitchell revealed that he quickly built it up to $60,000 playing small buy-in tournaments and then six max cash games but then went on to lose around $45,000 in two days. Mitchell confirmed in the same interview that though unnamed, he featured in an article in the Daily Telegraph about pupils at King's College allegedly becoming addicted to Internet poker.

Mitchell first came to national attention after finishing third behind Sam Trickett in the Luton leg of the Grosvenor UK Poker Tour on 10 August 2008 where he pocketed £45,100. Other good results on the UK poker circuit included a sixth-place finish in the Dusk Till Dawn Main Event in May 2009 for £11,250 and a runner up spot at the London Poker Circuit Super Stack on 26 July 2009 for another £5,750. He later finished second at the World Heads Up Poker Championship in October 2009 to Bambos Xanthos.

On 5 April 2010 won the Irish Poker Open. Mitchell beat Irishman Paul Carr heads up to take the €600,000 first prize.

Mitchell also took part in the 2010 World Series of Poker Europe, finishing 31st place in the £10,000 buy-in Main Event.

His first tournament win in 2011 came in the €500 PLO event at EPT Deauville on 31 January where he finished fifth for €1,510.
