= Michael Keiner =

German poker player (born 1959)

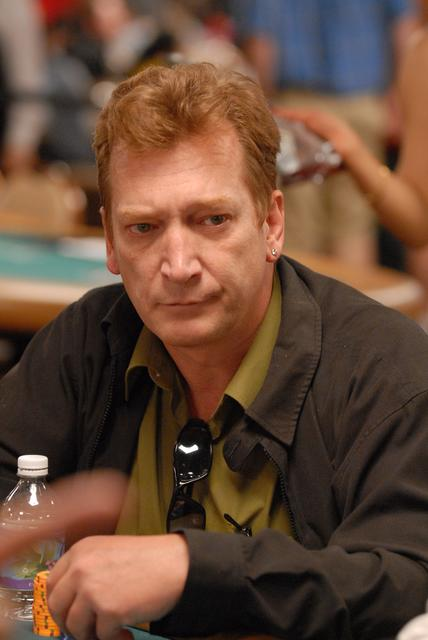
- Keiner, after winning the $1,500 Seven Card Stud event at the 2007 World Series of Poker
- Nickname: The Doc
- Born: 8 February 1959 (age 67); Wetzlar, Germany

World Series of Poker
- Bracelet: 1
- Money finishes: 8
- Highest WSOP Main Event finish: None

European Poker Tour
- Title: None
- Final table: None
- Money finish: 1

Michael Keiner (born 8 February 1959 in Wetzlar, Germany) is a German poker player best known for winning a Seven-card stud WSOP bracelet in Event #14 of the 2007 WSOP.

In 1997, Keiner became European Champion of Pot Limit Seven Card Stud.

As of 2023, his live tournament winnings exceed $1,300,000.
