= Marty Smyth =

Irish poker player

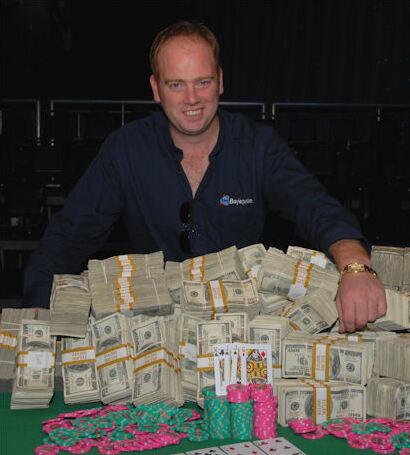
- Smyth after winning the 2008 WSOP $10,000 Pot Limit Omaha World Champion

World Series of Poker
- Bracelet: 1
- Money finishes: 2
- Highest WSOP Main Event finish: None

European Poker Tour
- Title: None
- Final table: None
- Money finish: 1

Marty Smyth is a professional poker player from Belfast, Northern Ireland with a track record including wins in the 2007 Irish Poker Open Championship and the 2008 Poker Million. He won his first WSOP bracelet in the 2008 $10,000 Pot Limit Omaha World Championship.

== Poker career ==
Marty Smyth has played poker since his early teens. He first discovered Omaha and Texas hold'em on a weekend trip to a Dublin casino at the age of 22. He continued to play regularly, eventually becoming a successful professional player. In March 2008 Smyth signed a sponsorship deal with Irish-based company, Boylepoker.com. Marty was the highest earning European player in 2007 and has since been nominated for two European Poker Awards, Player of the Year 2008 and Best Tournament Performance 2008.

=== Irish Poker Open ===
Smyth has placed in the Irish Poker Open, Europe's oldest and largest poker tournament, on four occasions. He placed 7th in 2002 and 6th in 2003. In the 2006 event, Smyth placed 15th. He defeated the largest field ever assembled for a European poker tournament when in 2007, he won the €3,300 buy-in event in Dublin. 708 players began the four-day event playing down to the final table. Smyth eventually defeated Roland De Wolfe in a heads-up encounter Terry Rogers Memorial Trophy and earning €650,000. The event was televised in Ireland on RTÉ Two and internationally on Challenge.

=== Poker Million ===
Smyth competed in the Ladbrokes sponsored Poker Million V event in England in 2006. He placed 6th on the final table, winning $100,000 in prize money. The event was broadcast on Sky Sports. He also made the final table the following year, finishing 2nd to Joe Beevers for $500,000. In 2008, Smyth reached a record-breaking third consecutive final of the event, winning the $1,000,000 first prize.

=== World Series of Poker ===
Smyth won the $10,000 Pot-Limit Omaha World Championship on 2 July 2008 winning $859,532. On the final hand on a board of Q♣ 9♥ 10♣, Smyth made a pot-size bet of 600,000 holding K♣ J♣ J♠ Q♦ holding a made king-high straight, his opponent Peter Jetten re-raised pot, Smyth then re-raised all-in and was call by Jetten who was holding K♠ J♦ 3♦ 2♣ for the same king-high straight, however Smyth was freerolling on the re-draw to a flush as well as an open-ended straight flush draw, both the King high and the Royal Flush, the turn was a blank, the 7♦, but the river brought the 6♣ giving Smyth the winning flush and the Championship. Marty considers his bracelet win to be his biggest achievement, but highlights the Irish Open title as his most "life-changing".

==== World Series of Poker Bracelet ====
Year	Tournament	Prize (US$)
2008	$10,000 Pot-Limit Omaha World Championship	$859,532

As of 2009, his total live tournament winnings exceed $3,700,000. His two cashes at the WSOP account for $863,382 of those winnings.
