= Peter Jetten =

Canadian poker player (born 1985)

- Nickname: Apathy
- Born: March 26, 1985 (age 41); Toronto, Ontario, Canada

World Series of Poker
- Bracelet: None
- Final tables: 3
- Money finishes: 9
- Highest WSOP Main Event finish: 54th, 2010

World Poker Tour
- Money finishes: 2

European Poker Tour
- Final tables: 2
- Money finishes: 3

Peter Jetten (born March 26, 1985) is a Canadian poker player. Jetten is known for playing online poker under the screen name "Apathy". He has over $9,300,000 in live poker tournament winnings.

== Personal life ==
Jetten was born in Toronto, Ontario. He was attending the University of Western Ontario when he won his first online poker tournament. After attending school there for two years, he decided to drop out and pursue his poker career. Jetten currently lives in Toronto, but spends most of the year travelling.

== Poker ==
Jetten played his first live tournament in a city just outside Toronto in 2005. By 2006, Jetten started to utilize his talents on the tournament circuit, finishing 8th at the World Series of Poker (WSOP) $2,500 Short Handed No-Limit Hold ‘em event. It was in 2008, however, that Jetten really started to make waves, just missing out on his first bracelet by finishing second to Marty Smyth in the $10,000 World Championship Pot Limit Omaha event at the WSOP to take home over $500,000. He followed that up a few months later with a fourth-place finish at the High Roller event of the European Poker Championships in London for $346,078.

After three cashes in the 2009 World Series of Poker, Jetten started 2010 with a fifth-place result in the Aussie Millions Main Event to add another $300,000 to his bankroll. Later in the year, he returned to the WSOP and reached the final table of the $10,000 Pot Limit Hold ‘em Event, before making a deep run in the Main Event, where he finished in 54th place.

In 2018, he won over $2.4 million combined in three tournaments in the Triton Poker Super High Roller Series. In 2019, he had similar success in the Triton Poker Super High Roller Series, which three cashes almost worth a combined $3.5 million.

=== Online poker ===
Jetten started playing poker in 2004 when he made two cashes in freeroll tournaments for a combined $75. Over the next year he turned that $75 into a $100 000 bankroll. Since then Jetten has continuously played in online tournaments. He is also a regular high-stakes cash game player.
