= Theo Jørgensen =

Danish poker player

World Series of Poker
- Bracelet: 1
- Final tables: 4
- Money finishes: 6
- Highest WSOP Main Event finish: 30th, 2010

World Poker Tour
- Title: 1
- Final tables: 2
- Money finishes: 3

European Poker Tour
- Title: None
- Final tables: 2
- Money finishes: 4

Theo Jørgensen (born 3 May 1972 in Roskilde) is a Danish professional poker player, based in Copenhagen.

Jørgensen began playing poker in the early 1990s. He has been sponsored by betting company BET24 and is now sponsored by PokerStars.

== Tournament success ==
In 2004, Jørgensen won the European Seven-card stud championship in Baden, taking home the €101,688 first prize.

In 2006, Jørgensen made his first European Poker Tour (EPT) final table, finishing 4th in the second season event in Deauville.

In 2008, Jørgensen won the World Series of Poker Europe (WSOPE) £5000 Pot Limit Omaha tournament, winning £218,626.

Jørgensen represented Denmark in the Poker Nations Cup, where he defeated Padraig Parkinson to win his preliminary heat. He was chosen by Danish captain Martin Wendt to play in the Grand Final, where he was eliminated by Kathy Liebert. He also represented his country in the PartyPoker.com Football & Poker Legends Cup, where he was a member of the winning Danish team, alongside Gus Hansen and Kim Christofte. Jørgensen was the only player in the tournament to finish in the top two in all four matches he played in, and won the individual prize when he defeated team-mate Hansen.

In May 2010 he won his first World Poker Tour (WPT) title in the Season 9 Grand Prix de Paris, collecting €633,902.

At the 2010 World Series of Poker (WSOP) main event, he finished in 30th place.

At the WPT Season 11 Grand Prix de Paris, in September 2012, Jørgensen finished in 2nd place for €264,600 ($333,128).

On 3 December 2012, Jørgensen was robbed by three men in his house. He was shot three times during the robbery.

On 10 March 2013, Jorgensen finished fourth in the EPT London Main Event for £183,000.

As of 2023, his total live tournament winnings exceed $4,200,000. His cashes at the WSOP account for over $900,000 of those winnings.
