= Neil Channing =

English poker player (born 1967)

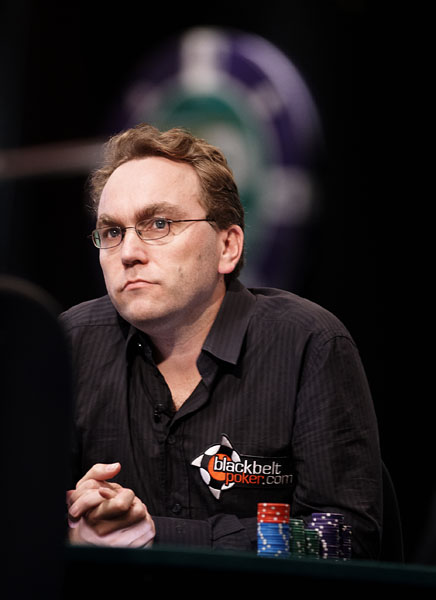
- Channing at the Irish Open 2010.
- Nickname: Bad Beat
- Born: Neil Andrew Channing; 9 December 1967 (age 58); Reading, Berkshire, England

World Series of Poker
- Money finishes: 33
- Highest WSOP Main Event finish: 131st, 2007

European Poker Tour
- Money finish: 1

Neil Andrew Channing (born 9 December 1967) is an English professional poker player and author based in Maida Vale, London. He is the 2008 Irish Poker Open champion. He is also the Ambassador for Sky Poker.

Before turning professional, he worked as a bookmaker at various UK racecourses, and now provides books part-time for various sports betting companies. He has retained a keen interest in betting, and can often be spotted at big events such as the Grand National and the Cheltenham Festival.

In March 2008, Channing won the 2008 Irish Poker Open and €801,400 (over $1,200,000) against a field of 667 players.

Channing has also enjoyed success on home soil, in particular in the GUKPT. In March 2010, he finished second in GUKPT London for £84,700 before finally capturing his first UK title in the Luton leg of August of the same year. Channing's victory for £64,050 elevated him into the top 3 of the all-time GUKPT ranking list.

Although a bracelet has thus far evaded him, Channing has cashed 33 times in WSOP/E events, putting him first in the UK in front of David Ulliott (32) and Surinder Sunar (31). In 2008, he cashed nine times. Channing's had two close calls at a bracelet: once in 2010 when he finished second in the $5,000 No Limit Hold'em Shootout for $273,153, and another in 2012 where he finished 2nd in a $1,500 No Limit Holdem for $406,409.

As of 2023, his total live tournament winnings exceed $3,400,000.

Channing is a regular columnist for Bluff Europe Magazine. Until 2009, he was sponsored to play poker tournaments by Pokerverdict.com. From 2009 until early 2014, he was a sponsored pro at Blackbeltpoker.com alongside bracelet-winner Richard Ashby.

On 27 April 2009, Neil launched his new site, Black Belt Poker, that ran as a skin on the iPoker network, which he co-founded with fellow poker pro Nik Persaud. Neil also wrote a regular blog on the site and is an active participant in its promotion. On 28 February 2014, Black Belt Poker closed for business and ceased trading.

Neil is well known for backing/staking other players, and had 25 percent in James Akenhead who made the November Nine. Neil also sponsored eight players in the summer of 2009 with $20,000 WSOP packages under the Black Belt Poker umbrella. Neil played a number of events cashing in five, his biggest score coming in the $40,000 No Limit Hold'em freezeout where he finished 20th for $71,858.

In 2014 Neil Channing became the official ambassador for Sky Poker. Appearing on Sky Poker TV to give live hand analysis, as well as writing blogs and strategy articles for the UK poker site. Neil also frequents the Sky Poker cash games, both live and on the virtual felt under the alias 'NCHANNING.' In his first few months as the newly appointed ambassador, Channing scored his highest ever finish on Sky Poker, coming second in the UK Online Poker Series (UKOPS) Main Event Bounty Hunter for just over £6000. He will continue to support Sky Poker also, at the bi-annual UK Poker Championships which are held at Nottingham based casino, Dusk Till Dawn.
