= Sorel Mizzi =

Canadian poker player (born 1986)

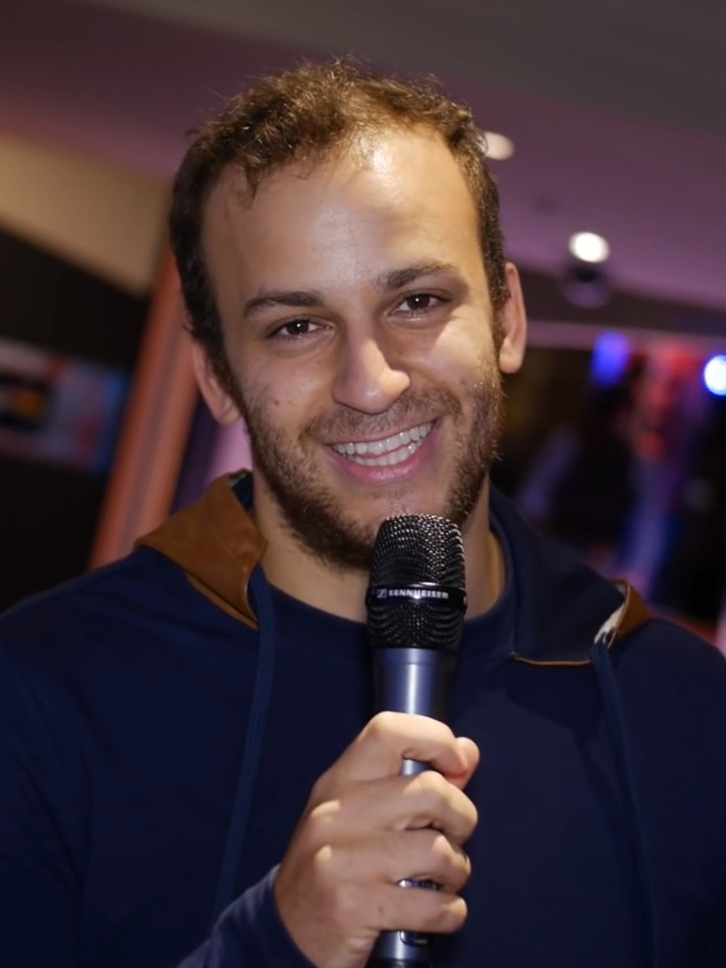
- Sorel Mizzi in 2015
- Nicknames: Imper1um, Zangbezan24
- Born: April 16, 1986 (age 40); Toronto, Ontario, Canada

World Series of Poker
- Bracelet: None
- Final tables: 3
- Money finishes: 15
- Highest WSOP Main Event finish: 95th, 2011

World Poker Tour
- Title: None
- Final tables: 5
- Money finishes: 14

European Poker Tour
- Title: None
- Final tables: 4
- Money finishes: 7

Sorel Mizzi (born April 16, 1986, in Toronto, Ontario) is a Canadian professional poker player. Mizzi plays online poker under the names of "Imper1um" and "Zangbezan24".

As of early 2025, Mizzi has total live tournament earnings of $14.4 Million USD with his best live cash being $2,073,868.

He also has online tournament earnings of approximately $3.6 million. He is also a regular in the online high-stakes cash games where he plays at Titan Poker under the name of Imper1um.

== Poker ==
Mizzi's early career live tournament finishes include a tenth place at the September 2006 Ultimate Bet Aruba Poker Classic for $29,800, and in April 2007, a third place at the 2007 Irish Poker Open where he earned $280,284. In 2008 Mizzi finished 2nd in the £5,000 – Pot Limit Omaha Event at the 2008 World Series of Poker Europe.

In late December 2010, Mizzi was named both 2010 BLUFF Player of the Year and 2010 PTPR Tournament Poker Player of the Year

In 2013, Mizzi won the PartyPoker Premier League VII, earning $466,000. In the same year, he won $2,073,868 after finishing in 3rd place at the HK$1,000,000 No Limit Hold’em event.

Mizzi made a $10,000 proposition bet at 3:1 odds that he could swim from Ipanema Beach to an island 5km away in May 2014. Mizzi completed the swim, and donated 10% of the payout to charity.

In December 2015, Mizzi participated in a charity boxing match against fellow professional poker player Brian Rast at Syndicate MMA Gym in Las Vegas. Proceeds from the ticket sales were donated to REG Charity. He won the match by a third-round knockout.

In 2022, Mizzi was ranked the 7th richest Canadian poker player by the Toronto Guardian.

As of 2025, Mizzi's live tournament winnings exceed $14.4 Million USD.

=== World Poker Tour ===
At the World Poker Tour Championship at the Bellagio in 2007, Mizzi finished 15th, winning $154,705. At the 2007 World Series of Poker, Mizzi cashed three times, including 208th in the no limit Texas hold'em main event.

At the 2008 Five Diamond World Poker Classic, Mizzi won the $3,000 No-Limit Hold'em event, earning $143,050.

Mizzi finished in 10th place at the WPT L.A. Poker Classic in 2012.

Mizzi reached the top 16 at WPT Amsterdam in 2015. He also reached the final table at WPT Bay 101 Shooting Star.

Mizzi finished in 3rd place at WPT Montreal in 2018.

=== Full Tilt Online Poker Series ===
On February 15, 2007, Mizzi won Event #7 of FTOPS III, a $216 buy in No-Limit hold'em tournament with a prize of $90,384.

In May 2007, Mizzi won his 2nd FTOPS title, taking home $40,972 for his victory in event #8 of FTOPS IV, a $216 buy in Pot-Limit Hold'em tournament. The win made Mizzi the second player in FTOPS history to win two events.

In 2011, Mizzi topped the FTOPS XX leaderboard after cashing in 17 of the series 45 events and earning 1,365 points.

=== Titan Poker sponsorship ===
As of March 2010, Sorel is sponsored by online poker room Titan Poker as the leader of their Pro Team. During 2010 Player of the Year run, his major winnings include finishing 13th in the $5,000 buy-in no-limit hold’em event of EPT Caribbean Adventure for $16,295 and fifth in the heads-up event for $17,600; a 3rd place at the Aussie Millions Poker Championship in January for $659K. second place in February at the L.A. Poker Classic’s $500 buy-in double stack event ($20,530) and sixth in the Classic’s $1,000 buy-in hold’em event ($9,210); 1st place at the Wynn Classic in the $2,000 buy-in no-limit hold’em event for $85,147 and a fifth place in the $1,500 buy-in no-limit hold’em event for $10,389. Sorel then followed it up by securing his first victories as a Titan Team captain during EPT Snowfest by winning two side events (€1,000+€100 NLHE Freezeout and the €500+€50 rebuy tournament) for a total of $95K.

In April he finished 81st in the Main Event of NAPT Mohegan Sun for $8,500. Then he won 1st place for $170,000 at the Borgata Spring Poker Open's East Coast Championship in Atlantic City. Mizzi also took 6th place in the €25,000 buy-in EPT Monte Carlo High Roller Event for $190,000. He won a SCOOP title - $118,500 for 1st place in event #32, and a 2nd Place in the WPT High-Roller event (€20 000 buy-in) for €120 000.

== Notable wins ==
- 2007, Irish Poker Open
- 2010, Final tabling at the World Series of Poker (WSOP) Europe Main Event
- 2010, World Poker Tour (WPT), 1st place
- 2010, European Poker Tour (EPT), 1st place
- 2010, PokerStars, 5th place
- 2011, World Poker Tour (WPT), 1st place
- 2013, PartyPoker Premier League VII
- 2012, PartyPoker, 1st place
- 2014, European Poker Tour (EPT), 1st place
- 2015, PokerStars, 4th place
- 2015, World Poker Tour (WPT), 8th place
