= John Falconer (poker player) =

British poker player

- Nickname: Burnley John
- Born: c. 1955 (age 70–71)

World Series of Poker
- Bracelet: None
- Money finishes: 2
- Highest WSOP Main Event finish: 235th, 2005

European Poker Tour
- Title: None
- Final table: 1
- Money finishes: 2

"Burnley" John Falconer (born c. 1955) is a British professional poker player. His poker career peaked in 2005 with an Irish Open title and a number of cash finishes.

== Career ==
In October 2004, Falconer finished runner-up to John Shipley in the European Poker Tour (EPT) first season London event, winning £117,000. He finished on the television bubble for the EPT Dublin event later the same month.

In March 2005, Falconer won the PaddyPowerPoker Irish Poker Open event, defeating Alan Betson to take home the €146,000 first prize. Later the same month, Falconer made the semi-finals of the World Heads-Up Poker Championship, losing to Simon Nowab.

Falconer also finished in the money of the 2005 World Series of Poker $10,000 no limit hold'em main event.

In October 2005, Falconer finished second to Phil "The Unabomber" Laak in his heat of the William Hill Poker Grand Prix, qualifying him for the semi-final where he finished fifth.

His last cash is from 4 March 2008. As for June 2015 his total amount of cash is more than $620,000.
