= Gus Hansen =

Danish poker player (born 1974)

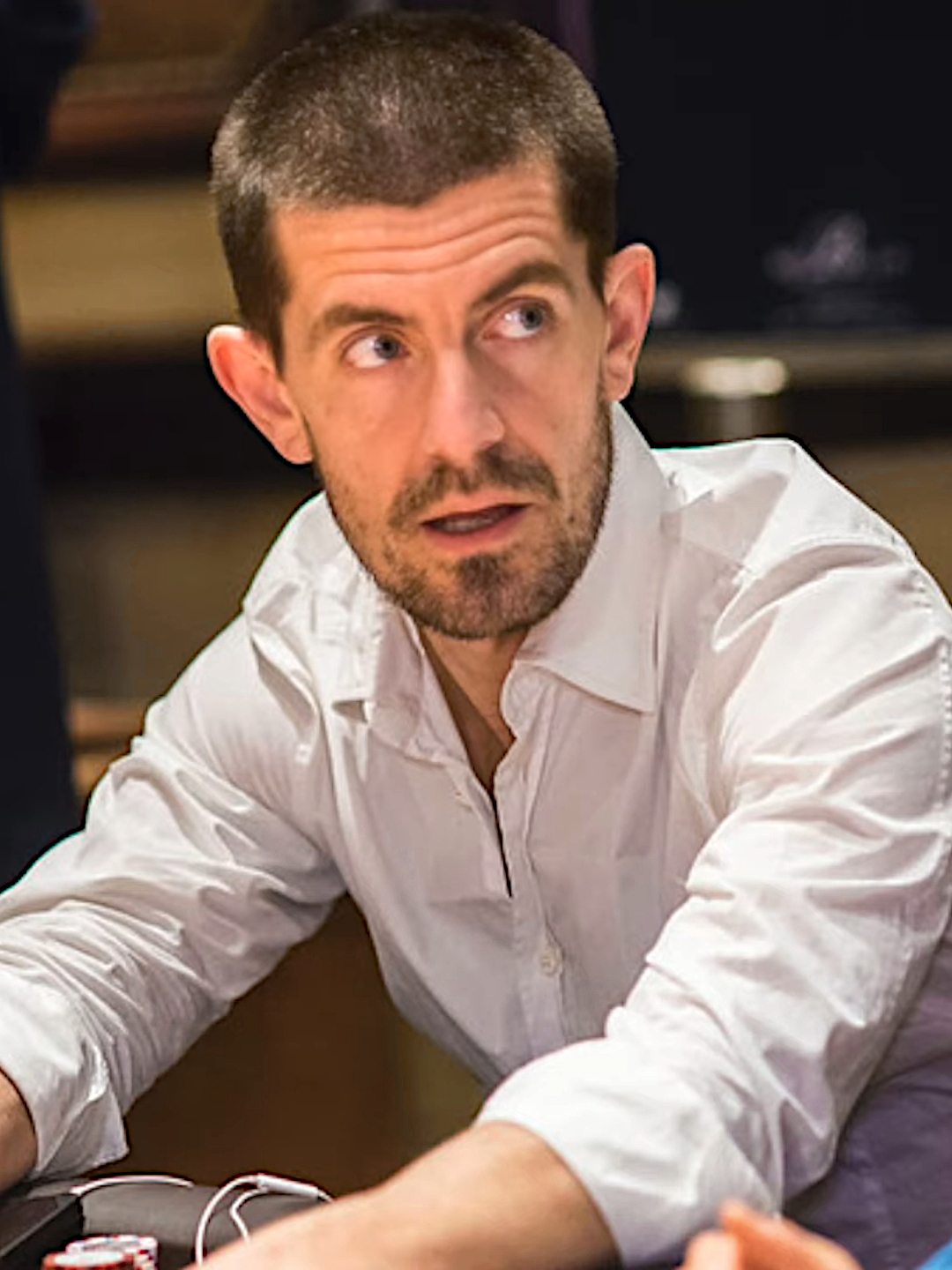
- Hansen at the 2016 WPT Five Diamond World Poker Classic
- Nickname: The Great Dane
- Born: Gustav Hansen; 13 February 1974 (age 52); Denmark
- Playing style: Ultra-Loose Aggressive
World Series of Poker
- Bracelet(s): 1
- Money finish(es): 9
- Highest ITM Main Event finish: 61st, 2007
World Poker Tour
- Title(s): 3
- Final table(s): 7
- Money finish(es): 9
European Poker Tour
- Final table(s): 1
- Money finish(es): 3
- Information last updated on 25 August 2017

Gustav Hansen (born 13 February 1974) is a Danish professional poker player from Copenhagen, Denmark who has lived in Monaco since 2003. In his poker career, Hansen has won three World Poker Tour open titles, one WSOP bracelet and the 2007 Aussie Millions main event, and was the season one winner of the Poker Superstars Invitational Tournament. Before turning to playing poker professionally in 1997, Hansen was already a world class backgammon player and a youth tennis champion.

== Poker career ==
=== Tournaments ===
Hansen started playing poker at the Ocean View Card Room in Santa Cruz, California, while he was an exchange student at UC Santa Cruz. Hansen recorded his first major tournament cash with a victory in the WPT Five Diamond World Poker Classic in May 2002. He won $556,460 for his victory. In February 2003, Hansen won the $10,000 No Limit Hold'em Championship at the WPT LA Poker Classic for $532,490. In January 2004, he won the PokerStars Caribbean Adventure $7,500 No Limit Hold'em event for $455,780. Hansen was the first player to win three World Poker Tour (WPT) open tournaments. In addition, he won the first WPT Bad Boys of Poker invitational event. Hansen finished in the money in 150th place in the 2004 WSOP Main Event. In the 2006 Tournament of Champions, Hansen made a World Series of Poker final table, but lost on the very first hand with ace king against a pair of 9s. In 2007, Hansen cashed in the $10,000 no limit Texas hold 'em championship, coming in 61st place out of 6,358 players, winning $154,194. In 2008, he came in 160th place out of 6,844 players to win a prize of $41,816.

In 2004, he was inducted into the World Poker Tour Walk of Fame, along with Doyle Brunson and James Garner. On 27 April 2008, Hansen came in second to David Chiu at the Season 6 WPT Championship, earning $1,714,800. In September 2006, Hansen won the inaugural EPM event, The London All Star Challenge, beating Marc Goodwin to take home the title and a cheque for £53,600 ($US100,275). Hansen won the inaugural $400,000 Poker Superstars Invitational Tournament, winning the $1,000,000 first prize in a one-table event featuring some of the best-known players. He did not appear in the second series, and lost to Antonio Esfandiari in the semifinals of the third.

Hansen made the final table of a European Poker Tour (EPT) event in Barcelona in September 2005. In 2006, Hansen was a member of the winning Danish team in the PartyPoker.com Football & Poker Legends Cup tournament, alongside Theo Jørgensen and Kim Christofte. He was featured in the Professional Poker Tour and the second season of High Stakes Poker, where he won the fifth biggest pot in the show's history ($575,700), when his 5♦ 5♣ defeated Daniel Negreanu's 6♠ 6♥ on a board of 9♣ 6♦ 5♥ 5♠ 8♠. He was in Singapore in 12–17 November 2006, to participate in the Betfair Asian Poker Tour. Hansen was the first winner on NBC's Poker After Dark, earning $120,000, as he outlasted a field of six pros, including Phil Hellmuth and Huck Seed. In January 2007, Hansen won the $10,500 main event at the Aussie Millions in Melbourne, Australia, beating a field of 747 players to take home the A$1,500,000 first prize. In 2008, Lyle Stuart Kensington published Hansen's book Every Hand Revealed (ISBN 978-0818407277), a hand-by-hand account of his win.

In 2010, Hansen won the £10,350 No Limit Hold'em High Roller Heads-Up event at the WSOPE, winning his first WSOP bracelet and £288,409, equivalent to $451,880. He also defeated Tony Bloom heads-up to win the Poker Million IX tournament, taking $1,000,000 for first prize. In January 2012, he finished 3rd in the A$250,000 No Limit Hold'em - $250,000 Challenge at the Aussie Millions Poker Championship in Melbourne for $823,579.

=== World Series of Poker bracelet ===
Year	Event	Prize Money
2010E	£10,350 No Limit Hold'em High Roller Heads-Up	£288,409

An "E" following a year denotes bracelet(s) won at the World Series of Poker Europe

=== Poker losses ===
Despite his ongoing success, Hansen has struggled with money problems, reportedly because of losses in live cash games. Hansen is a regular in the Big Game normally held in "Bobby's Room" at the Bellagio Casino in Las Vegas. He has said that his losses are not a secret and has admitted to losing a million dollars or so at a couple of games. He has lost $20.7 million on Full Tilt Poker as of March 2015.

=== Style ===
Hansen plays according to a strict pot odds-deductive approach which was highly successful in the poker-boom years, but which has also, in recent times, become highly volatile.

=== Career earnings ===
As of August 2023, Hansen's total live tournament winnings exceeds $10,000,000.

== Other ventures ==
Hansen calls himself a professional gambler, and has been known to take private bets on various personal athletic challenges other than poker and professional sports, such as a boxing match against WSOPE bracelet winner Theo Jorgensen.

Hansen was a member of the original Team FullTilt, and was re-signed as the first brand ambassador under the new management team of Full Tilt Poker.

Hansen has been involved previously or currently in several online business ventures. Hansen was a founding partner and house professional of the online poker site PokerChamps.com, launched in 2003. In 2005 the company and game software technology were sold to the British company Betfair, for over 100 million Danish kroner (approximately £8.8 million / €13 million / US$15,000,000). In 2005, Hansen appeared in Texas Hold 'Em Poker Advanced Strategies With Gus Hansen, which is part of the Going All In instructional series of DVDs. In 2007, Hansen launched a poker forum and strategy website, ThePlayr.com. Prior to selling his interest in that site in 2008, it housed his blog, articles and a "Gus Tracker" to track his worldwide poker play along with other poker news, videos and content. In 2008, Hansen joined the commentary team on World Series of Backgammon, a high-stakes televised backgammon tour broadcasting on Eurosport across Europe. In February 2009, Hansen launched GusHansenTV branded as a free poker channel broadcast over the internet.

In 2017, Hansen said that he had been involved in a music business in Denmark but that "it went probably as bad as my online poker career!"

Hansen was voted one of People magazine's 50 Sexiest Men in 2004.

In March 2018, Hansen returned on Poker After Dark to play pot-limit Omaha in a game also featuring Matt Kirk.

== Bibliography ==
- Every Hand Revealed (2008) ISBN 0-8184-0727-1
