= Roland De Wolfe =

English poker player

- De Wolfe backstage at the 2006 World Poker Tour Grand Prix de Paris
- Born: London

World Series of Poker
- Bracelet: 1
- Money finishes: 17
- Highest WSOP Main Event finish: None

World Poker Tour
- Title: 1
- Final tables: 2
- Money finishes: 4

European Poker Tour
- Title: 1
- Final table: 1
- Money finishes: 5

Roland De Wolfe is an English professional poker player and a former writer for the poker magazine Inside Edge.

After winning first prize in an event at the 2004 Gutshot Poker Festival, De Wolfe went on to cash in the $1,000 No Limit event of the 2005 World Series of Poker (WSOP).

In July 2005, De Wolfe won first place in the Major Grand Prix de Paris event of the World Poker Tour (WPT)'s fourth season, defeating former champion Juha Helppi in the final heads-up battle.

In April 2006, De Wolfe finished in third place out of 605 entries in the WPT $25,000 Championship event at the Bellagio, winning over $1,000,000. In October 2006, De Wolfe won the European Poker Tour (EPT) Dublin event, and the €554,300 first prize. In the process, he became the first person to win an event in the WPT and the EPT.

De Wolfe also reached the final table of the 2008 edition of Late Night Poker, finishing runner-up Andreas Jorbeck.

In June 2009, De Wolfe won his first World Series of Poker bracelet, winning the $5,000 Pot Limit Omaha Hi-Low Split 8 or Better tournament for $246,616 and in doing so became only the second person (after Gavin Griffin) to complete the hat-trick of WSOP, EPT, and WPT titles.

As of 2014, his total live tournament winnings exceed $5,325,000. His 17 cashes at the WSOP account for $1,214,153 of those winnings.
