= World Series of Poker Casino Employee Championship =

Championship in the World Series of Poker gathering

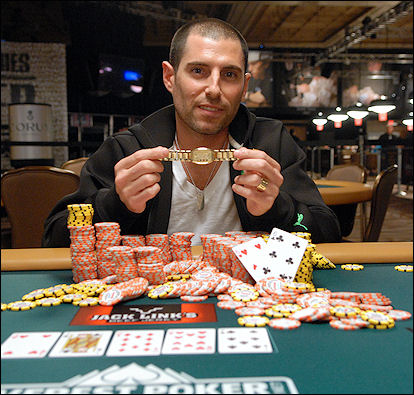
Andrew Cohen, the 2009 World Series of Poker Casino Employee Championship winner

The Casino Employees Championship is one of only three closed tournaments awarding WSOP bracelets at the World Series of Poker gathering. While most of the events are open to the general public, participants in the Ladies Championship, Seniors Championship, and the Casino Employees Championship must meet certain eligibility requirements. While these events are closed, the winner of these events is "afforded the same distinction as all gold bracelet tournaments." The WSOP bracelet is considered the most coveted non-monetary prize a poker player can win.

== History ==
The World Series of Poker (WSOP), held annually in Las Vegas, is "the oldest, largest, most prestigious, and most media-hyped gaming competition in the world". In 2000, the WSOP started to honor Casino Employees by offering a bracelet event that only they could enter. The first tournament was called the "Dealers World Poker Championship" because it was limited to poker dealers. The following year the field was open to all casino employees.

Since the tournament is restricted to casino employees, most of the big name poker professionals and previous bracelet winners are not allowed to participate. Therefore, even though the Casino Employee Championship is a World Series of Poker bracelet event, it has typically received relatively little coverage. Despite this perception, the Casino Employee Championship event does involve numerous recognized names in the poker world. The 2009 tournament included two time bracelet winner Pat Poels, WSOP vice president Ty Stewart, Bellagio Tournament Director/Former WSOP Director Jack McClelland, and Woman Poker Hall of Famer Marsha Waggoner.

Prior to 2003, the tournament format was a Limit Hold'em tournament, but in 2004, No-Limit Hold'em became the standard. The 2006 tournament, with 1,232 entrants, was the largest field ever for the event. Since its inception, with the exception of 2008, the Casino Employees event has started on the first day of the WSOP. Much of the drama encountered at the Casino Championship often involves informal rivalries between dealers and proposition players. Proposition players are people hired to play poker, with their own money, at casinos to get games started or to ensure that they do not die out. Thus, while both the prop and dealer are casino employees, they sit on opposite sides of the table.

== Highlights ==
In 2000, Dave Alizadeth from Las Vegas outlasted a field of 109 participants to become the first "Dealers World Poker Championship". While other Dealer Tournaments had a reputation for sloppy play, the first Dealer Championship was noted for the seriousness with which the players approached the game. In the end, however, the winner was not determined by the deal of the cards, but by a deal at the table. According to initial reports, the deal was only achieved because "a World Series bracelet was not available for negotiation, the players decided to take their money and go home." Other sources, however, indicate that the event was always intended to be a bracelet event. Either way, the official WSOP standings, credits Alizadeth with winning a WSOP bracelet at this event. By contrast the final three contestants at the 2003 Championship were doing Kamikaze shots. "We were all having such a great time," the winner David Lukaszewski said, "sitting around playing poker that I think we may have forgotten about the prize money and the bracelet."

The 2002 Casino Employee Championship almost mirrored Treetop Straus's amazing comeback in the 1982 WSOP Main Event. At the 1982 Main Event, Treetop was down to one $500 chip and came back to win the tournament. At the Casino Employee Championship, Dave Crunkleton, who has made 11 final WSOP tables but never won a bracelet, was down to one $500 chip with only four players left in the tournament. Crunkleton went all in with pocket eights and then succeeded in rebuilding his stack to $26,000 before being busted in third place. The 2002 winner, David Warga went on to become the first Casino Employee Champion to win a WSOP open event in 2010.

Many top professional poker players got their start working in casinos. 1998 WSOP Main Event Champion and five-time bracelet winner, Scotty Nguyen's first job was as a dealer. Ted Forrest, a six-time bracelet winner, credits his ability to read players because of his experience as a dealer. One-time bracelet winner Erick Lindgren also boasts a pedigree of starting out as a dealer.

== Key ==
Event	The buy-in and poker variant played
Year	The year of the tournament
Winner	The person who won the Employee Championship Event
Prize (US$)	The amount of money they won for winning the Employee Event that year
Winnings	Lifetime winnings in WSOP and WSOP Circuit events
Bracelets	WSOP victories are counted in terms of bracelets, this column represents the total number of bracelets the player won.
Ref.	References

== WSOP Casino Employee Championship Events ==
Event	Year	Winner	Prize (US$)	Winnings	Bracelets	Ref.
$500 Dealers Championship Limit Hold'em	2000	Dave Alizadeth	$21,800	$21,800	1	
$500 Employee Event - Limit Hold'em	2001	Travis Jonas	$40,200	$40,200	1	
$500 Employee Event - Limit Hold'em	2002	David Warga	$47,300	$57,140	2	
$500 Casino Employees Limit Hold'em	2003	David Lukaszewski	$35,800	$35,800	1	
$500 Casino Employees No-Limit Hold'em	2004	Carl Nessel	$40,000	$40,000	1	
$500 Casino Employees No-Limit Hold'em	2005	Anthony Nguyen	$83,390	$83,390	1	
$500 Casino Employees No-Limit Hold'em	2006	Chris Gros	$127,496	$129,974	1	
$500 Casino Employees No-Limit Hold'em	2007	Frederick Narciso	$104,701	$108,305	1	
$500 Casino Employees No-Limit Hold'em	2008	Jonathan Kotula	$87,929	$87,929	1	
$500 Casino Employees No-Limit Hold'em	2009	Andrew Cohen	$83,833	$83,833	1	
$500 Casino Employees No-Limit Hold'em	2010	Hoai Pham	$71,424	$71,424	1	
$565 Casino Employees No-Limit Hold'em	2016	Christopher 'C.J.' Sand	$75,157	$75,157	1	
