= Ivo Donev =

Bulgarian chess and poker player (born 1959)

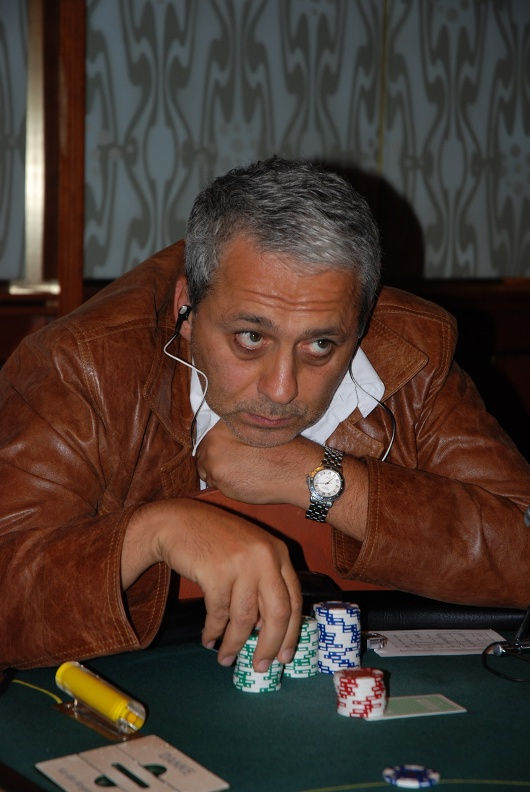
- Donev in 2010
- Born: 25 December 1959 (age 66)
- Nickname: The Chess Master

World Series of Poker
- Bracelet: 1
- Money finishes: 26
- Highest WSOP Main Event finish: None

European Poker Tour
- Title: None
- Final table: 1
- Money finishes: 7
- Chess career Chess career
- Country: Austria
- Title: International Master (1990)
- FIDE rating: 2291 (March 2022)
- Peak rating: 2420 (January 1997)

Ivo Donev (born 25 December 1959) is a Bulgarian, with Austrian passport, who is a professional chess and poker player.

== Chess ==
His father, Hristo Donev was a national master at chess.

Ivo Donev won the 1989 CSSR International Chess Tournament, progressing him to International Master status. When he and his family emigrated to Austria in 1990, Donev taught for a chess school at $10 per hour to support his study of computer science. Ivo Donev is the author of the chess book "The most important ideas in the end game" in German language.

== Poker ==
Donev studied the poker books of David Sklansky, Mason Malmuth, and Tom McEvoy and practiced using poker computer software.

Donev won a bracelet in the $1,500 Limit Omaha event at the 2000 World Series of Poker (WSOP), where he took home $85,800 for his first-place finish.

In 2002, Donev made his one and only appearance on Late Night Poker. He finished 5th out of an impressive field including Peter Costa, Dave Welch and Ram Vaswani. In 2003, Donev finished as a semi-finalist in the World Heads-Up Poker Championship.

He was a professional chess player before starting his poker career. His currently #1 in the Austrian All-Time Money list, and was the first Austrian to reach $1,000,000 in major tournament winnings.

=== World Series of Poker Money Finishes ===
- 2000 $1,500 Limit Omaha - 1st place ($85,800)
- 2001 $2,500 Seven Card Stud - 10th place ($5,530)
- 2002 $1,500 Pot Limit Hold'em - 10th place ($5,670)
- 2004 $1,500 Limit Hold'em Shootout - 6th place ($16,560)
- 2004 $2,000 Pot Limit Hold'em - 3rd place ($47,700)
- 2005 $2,000 Pot Limit Hold'em - 18th place ($6,955)
- 2005 $2,500 Limit Hold'em - 21st place ($5,145)
- 2005 $2,500 Pot Limit Hold'em - 10th place ($11,730)
- 2008 £2,500 WSOPE - H.O.R.S.E.- 2nd place ($95,543)
- 2009 $3,000 - N L Holdem- 64th place ($6,929)
- 2010 $2,000 - Limit Holdem- 26th place ($6,237)
- 2010 $2,500 - Limit/NL Holdem- 51st place ($4,512)
- 2011 $1,500 - H.O.R.S.E.- 83rd place ($2,899)
- 2011 $1,500 - Limit Hold'em Shootout - 55th place ($4,118)

- 2016 $1,500 - H.O.R.S.E.- 22rd place ($6,188)
- 2017 $50,000 - 8 Game - 4th place ($419.337)
- 2017 $1,100 WSOPE - NL Holdem - 76th place ($1,640)
- 2017 $550 - Pot Limit Omaha - 23rd place ($1,578)
- 2017 $1,100- No Limit Holdem - 34th place ($1,302)
- 2019 $1,500 - H.O.R.S.E.- 68th place ($2,638)
- 2019 $1,500 - 8 Game - 29th place ($4,841)
- 2019 $1,000 - No Limit Holdem - 49th place ($12,281)
- 2019 $1,500 - Pot Limit Omaha Hi/Lo- 78th place ($3,175)
- 2019 $1,500 - Omaha Mix - 8th place ($16,075)
- 2019 $550 - Pot Limit Omaha - 5th place ($10,900)
- 2021 $210 -WSOP Online No Limit Holdem- 287th place ($1,438)

== Personal life ==
He has two children, and lives in Lochau bei Bregenz, Austria.

His life and career is discussed in the James McManus book Positively Fifth Street.
