= Intercontinental Poker Championship =

2006 poker tournament in Las Vegas, U.S.

- 2006

Tournament information
- Sport: Poker
- Location: Las Vegas, Nevada, U.S.
- Dates: April 14–April 16, 2006
- Established: 2006
- Venue(s): Palms Hotel and Casino
- Participants: 21
- Purse: $350,000

Final positions
- Champion: (Japan) Yoshio Nakano
- Runner-up: (Australia) Tony G

The Intercontinental Poker Championship was a poker tournament featuring professional poker players representing various nations. 21 players competed in the inaugural event, which was taped at Palms Hotel and Casino April 14-16, 2006, and aired on CBS for seven weeks beginning June 17, 2006. Jeff Medders and Gabe Kaplan provided commentary.

== Play ==
The field of 21 players was split into three groups of seven, each of which participated in a double elimination Texas hold 'em "shootout." The winner from each group of seven advanced to the semi-finals. The remaining six players from each group competed again, with the winner also advancing.

With the field narrowed to six, the remaining players played another double elimination round. The winner advanced to the final table and the remaining five players competed again, with the winner advancing to the heads up final match.

At the best of three heads up final table, Yoshio Nakano of Japan defeated Australia's Tony G two out of three to take down $350,000. Tony G won $150,000 for his second-place finish.

== Season 2006 ==
=== Players ===
- David Benyamine (France)
- Chris Bjorin (Sweden)
- Humberto Brenes (Costa Rica)
- Doyle Brunson (USA)
- Jimmy Cha (South Korea)
- Johnny Chan (China)
- Eli Elezra (Israel)
- Sam Farha (Lebanon)
- Tony G (Australia)
- Chau Giang (Vietnam)
- Hasan Habib (Pakistan)
- Thor Hansen (Norway)
- Carlos Mortensen (Spain)
- Yosh Nakano (Japan)
- Daniel Negreanu (Canada)
- Donnacha O'Dea (Ireland)
- Ralph Perry (Russia)
- Refugio Quintero (Mexico)
- Marco Traniello (Italy)
- Dave "The Devilfish" Ulliot (England)
- Stephen Wolff (South Africa)

=== Round 1 ===
Match	Winner	Runner-up	Remaining players
Group A	Australia - Tony G advance to semi-final	England - Dave Ulliott	3 - Ireland - Donnacha O'Dea; 4 - Russia - Ralph Perry; 5 - United States - Doyle Brunson; 6 - Spain - Carlos Mortensen; 7 - Canada - Daniel Negreanu
Group B	Japan - Yoshio Nakano advance to semi-final	Israel - Eli Elezra	3 - China - Johnny Chan; 4 - Lebanon - Sam Farha; 5 - Pakistan - Hasan Habib; 6 - Norway - Thor Hansen; 7 - Sweden - Chris Björin
Group C	France - David Benyamine advance to semi-final	Mexico - Refugio Quintero	3 - Costa Rica - Humberto Brenes; 4 - South Korea - Jimmy Cha; 5 - Italy - Marco Traniello; 6 - Vietnam - Chau Giang; 7 - South Africa - Stephen Wolff

=== Round 2 ===
Match	Winner	Runner-up	Remaining players
Group A	Russia - Ralph Perry advance to semi-final	Spain - Carlos Mortensen	3 - Canada - Daniel Negreanu; 4 - Ireland - Donnacha O'Dea; 5 - United States - Doyle Brunson; 6 - England - Dave Ulliott
Group B	Lebanon - Sam Farha advance to semi-final	Pakistan - Hasan Habib	3 - Israel - Eli Elezra; 4 - China - Johnny Chan; 5 - Norway - Thor Hansen; 6 - Sweden - Chris Björin
Group C	South Africa - Stephen Wolff advance to semi-final	Costa Rica - Humberto Brenes	3 - Mexico - Refugio Quintero; 4 - Vietnam - Chau Giang; 5 - South Korea - Jimmy Cha; 6 - Italy - Marco Traniello

=== Semi-Final ===
Match	Winner	Runner-up	Remaining players
Round 1	Australia - Tony G advance to final	Japan - Yoshio Nakano	3 - Lebanon - Sam Farha; 4 - Russia - Ralph Perry; 5 - South Africa - Stephen Wolff; 6 - France - David Benyamine
Round 2	Japan - Yoshio Nakano advance to final	Russia - Ralph Perry	3 - Lebanon - Sam Farha; 4 - South Africa - Stephen Wolff; 5 - France - David Benyamine

=== Final ===
Match	Winner	Runner-up
Match 1	Japan - Yoshio Nakano	Australia - Tony G
Match 2	Australia - Tony G	Japan - Yoshio Nakano
Match 3	Japan - Yoshio Nakano	Australia - Tony G
Final Result	Japan - Yoshio Nakano $350,000	Australia - Tony G $150,000
