= Poker boom =

Period of increased global interest for no limit Texas hold 'em poker

The poker boom was a period between 2003 and 2006, during which poker, primarily no-limit Texas hold 'em, but also other variations, became considerably more popular around the world. During the boom years, the online poker player pool at least doubled in size every year.

== Causes ==
The seeds of the boom began in 1998, with the release of the film Rounders and the introduction of online poker at Planet Poker. These events built on the occasional telecasts of the World Series of Poker (WSOP) Main Events that were recorded each summer and broadcast later in the year.

Two specific 2003 triggers completed the launch of the poker boom. In the spring of 2003, the World Poker Tour's inaugural season debuted on the Travel Channel on American cable television. The impact of the boom was escalated in May 2003, when amateur Chris Moneymaker won the 2003 WSOP Main Event. Moneymaker won his seat via an $86 satellite tournament on the PokerStars online poker room. Moneymaker was one of 839 entrants in the 2003 event, an increase of roughly 200 players from 2002 and more than doubling the 393 competitors that played in 1999. By the next year, the field in the 2004 Main Event more than tripled to 2,576 players. By the 2006 Main Event, there were 8,773 competitors, 14 times as many as had entered the 2002 Main Event, the last event before the boom started.

It is also believed that the 2004–05 NHL lockout, and the subsequent filling of ESPN airtime with poker programming influenced the poker boom. Another view holds that the poker boom was a classic speculative bubble.

== Decline ==
The end of the boom is generally considered to be October 2006, when the Unlawful Internet Gambling Enforcement Act of 2006 (UIGEA) became law in the United States, and several online poker sites, including the industry leader at the time, Party Poker, left the United States. In the first WSOP following the passage of UIGEA, attendance in the WSOP Main Event dropped nearly 28%, from 8773 in 2006 to 6358 at the 2007 Main Event.

The game today remains much more popular than the pre-boom period, with WSOP Main Event attendance having stabilized near the 2007 level, in part due to higher growth levels internationally.

On April 15, 2011, three of the biggest online poker sites serving players in the United States had their web domains seized and shut down by U.S. Attorney's Office for the Southern District of New York, which alleged they were in violation of federal bank fraud and money laundering laws. Nevertheless, two of them continue to serve the international player pool, and numerous smaller sites continue to allow U.S. players.

== See also ==
- Bigger Deal: A Year Inside the Poker Boom
- Moneymaker effect
