= Moneymaker effect =

Growth of interest in poker after 2003

The Moneymaker effect is the sudden growth in interest in poker after the 2003 World Series of Poker Main Event. It refers to Chris Moneymaker, the amateur player who became World Champion and inspired a poker boom that lasted several years.

== History ==
The term was created after Chris Moneymaker, a 27-year-old accountant and amateur poker player from Tennessee, United States, outlasted 838 other players to win the 2003 World Series of Poker (WSOP) Main Event, thereby winning the US$2.5 million prize and the title of World Champion. He became the new poster boy for poker, inspiring potential players to believe that "staying at home in front of a computer screen could be more profitable than going to work." His improbable win also started a new era in poker in which "a nobody could topple the feared pros."

According to an article in the Las Vegas Sun, Moneymaker's victory has been credited with launching the "poker craze", along with assistance from televised tournaments with hole-card cameras and the increased popularity of online poker.

Moneymaker gained entrance to the 2003 World Series of Poker by winning a $86 poker satellite tournament at the online poker card room PokerStars. This win gave him a seat at a table in a larger satellite tournament whose grand prize was a seat at the World Series of Poker in Las Vegas, Nevada, which costs $10,000. He won that tournament and went on to compete in the 2003 WSOP event.

At the 2004 World Series of Poker the following year, a semi-professional player, Greg Raymer, also qualified online and won the Main Event, along with its $5 million grand prize, against a much larger field of 2,576 players.

Formerly a member of Team PokerStars, Moneymaker's biography on the PokerStars website read: "His story sparked a tidal wave of interest in poker, a phenomenon that's been nicknamed the 'Moneymaker Effect' [...] he'll always be remembered for that epic victory in 2003. It's a legacy he is clearly proud of and one that's given him the kind of life all poker players dream of." His story of an amateur beating some of the best poker players in the world and winning millions of dollars inspired millions of people to begin playing poker, online and in card rooms around the world.

== See also ==
- Poker boom
