= David Lukaszewski =

American poker player (born 1970)

- Born: 1970 (age 55–56)

World Series of Poker
- Bracelet: 1
- Money finish: 1
- Highest WSOP Main Event finish: None

David Lukaszewski (born 1970) is an American poker player. He was a Poker Room Shift Manager at the Desert Diamond Casino who won a bracelet in the 208-entry 2003 Casino Employees Championship event at the World Series of Poker. The Casino Employees Championship event was the first time that Lukaszewski had played in a tournament with a buy-in greater than $50. At the start of 2003, Lukaszewski set the modest goal of competing in a major poker tournament and at the last minute, he and several friends decided to drive to Las Vegas to play in the WSOP. Lukaszewski won the entry to the event by winning a $65 single-table satellite at Binion's Horseshoe. When the tournament reached the final three players, they started shooting Kamikaze's. "We were all having such a great time, sitting around playing poker that I think we may have forgotten about the prize money and the bracelet."

Lukaszewski's lifetime winnings exceed $36,000.

== World Series of Poker bracelets ==
Year	Tournament	Prize (US$)
2003	$500 Casino Employees Limit Hold'em	$35,800
