= Nessel =

Nessel is a surname. Notable people with the surname include:

- Carl Nessel (born 1947), a.k.a. "Coach," firefighter and poker winner in the 2004 Casino Employees Championship
- Dana Nessel (born 1969), American politician, attorney general of Michigan
- John Nessel (born 1952), American football player

== See also ==
- Nesselrode, an old German noble family
