= 2002 World Series of Poker =

Series of poker tournaments

- Location: Binion's Horseshoe, Las Vegas, Nevada
- Dates: April 19 – May 25

Champion
- (United States) Robert Varkonyi

The 2002 World Series of Poker (WSOP) was held at Binion's Horseshoe.

The 2002 WSOP was historically notable for two reasons. The series was the first WSOP in which pocket cams were installed to allow broadcasters (on tape delay) to show the players' hole cards, although only for the Main Event (today, the cameras are used at most WSOP events), and it was also the last WSOP before the 2003 Main Event victory of amateur Chris Moneymaker helped launch the 2000s poker boom.

== Events ==
There were 34 preliminary bracelet events at the 2002 World Series of Poker. Phil Ivey won three bracelets in this WSOP, giving him four for his career. He joined Doyle Brunson, Gary Berland, Bobby Baldwin, Lakewood Louie as the only players to win four bracelets in three years. Ivey was the first to accomplish the feat in the era of growing tournament fields.

#	Date	Event	Entries	Winner	Prize	Runner-up	Results
1	April 19, 2002	$500 Casino Employees Limit Hold'em	272	David Warga (1/1)	$47,300	Leon Wheeler	Results
2	April 20, 2002	$2,000 Limit Hold'em	610	Mike Majerus (1/1)	$407,120	David Chiu (0/3)	Results
3	April 21, 2002	$1,500 Omaha Hi-Lo Split	339	Perry Friedman (1/1)	$176,860	Greg Mascio	Results
4	April 22, 2002	$2,000 No Limit Hold'em	449	Layne Flack (1/2)	$303,880	Tom Jacobs	Results
5	April 23, 2002	$1,500 Seven Card Stud	253	Phil Ivey (1/2)	$132,000	Toto Leonidas	Results
6	April 24, 2002	$1,500 Limit Omaha	130	John Cernuto (1/3)	$73,320	Randy Holland (0/2)	Results
7	April 25, 2002	$1,500 Seven Card Stud Hi-Lo Split	240	Paul Clark (1/3)	$125,200	Andrew Prock	Results
8	April 26, 2002	$1,500 Pot Limit Omaha	151	Jack Duncan (1/1)	$192,560	Lindy Chambers	Results
9	April 26, 2002	$2,500 No Limit Hold'em Gold Bracelet Match Play	28	Johnny Chan (1/7)	$34,000	Phil Hellmuth (0/7)	Results
10	April 27, 2002	$2,000 Limit Seven Card Stud Hi-Lo	156	John Hennigan (1/1)	$117,320	Ben Tang	Results
11	April 28, 2002	$2,000 Pot Limit Hold'em	210	Jay Sipelstein (1/1)	$150,240	Barny Boatman	Results
12	April 29, 2002	$2,500 Seven Card Stud	123	Dan Torla (1/1)	$115,600	Bill Gibbs	Results
13	April 30, 2002	$3,000 Limit Hold'em	155	John Hom (1/1)	$174,840	Benny Wan	Results
14	May 1, 2002	$1,500 Razz	115	Billy Baxter (1/7)	$64,860	Chico Flynn	Results
15	May 2, 2002	$2,500 Pot Limit Omaha	89	Jan Vang Sørensen (1/1)	$185,000	Brent Carter (0/2)	Results
16	May 3, 2002	$2,500 Seven Card Stud Hi-Lo	126	Phil Ivey (2/3)	$118,440	Sirous Baghchehsaraie	Results
17	May 4, 2002	$3,000 Pot Limit Hold'em	175	Fred Berger (1/1)	$197,400	Chris Ferguson (0/3)	Results
18	May 5, 2002	$1,500 Ace to Five Lowball	111	Thor Hansen (1/2)	$62,600	Brian Nadell	Results
19	May 6, 2002	$1,500 No Limit Hold'em	528	Layne Flack (2/3)	$268,020	Johnny Chan (0/7)	Results
20	May 7, 2002	$2,500 Omaha Hi-Lo Split	144	Eddie Fishman (1/1)	$135,360	Doug Saab	Results
21	May 8, 2002	$1,500 Pot Limit Hold'em	340	John McIntosh (1/1)	$177,380	Mel Weiner (0/1)	Results
22	May 9, 2002	$5,000 Seven Card Stud	92	Qushqar Morad (1/1)	$172,960	Steven Banks	Results
23	May 10, 2002	$2,000 S.H.O.E.	143	Phil Ivey (3/4)	$107,540	Diego Cordovez (0/1)	Results
24	May 11, 2002	$5,000 Limit Hold'em	113	Jennifer Harman (1/2)	$221,440	Brian Green	Results
25	May 12, 2002	$1,500 Limit Hold'em Shootout	193	Joel Chaseman (1/1)	$96,400	Gene Timberlake	Results
26	May 12, 2002	$1,000 Ladies' Championship	107	Catherine Brown (1/1)	$39,880	Marie Sohn	Results
27	May 13, 2002	$5,000 Pot Limit Omaha	107	Robert Williamson III (1/1)	$201,160	Patrick Bruel (0/1)	Results
28	May 14, 2002	$1,500 Limit Hold'em	366	Meng La (1/1)	$190,920	Steve Kaufman	Results
29	May 15, 2002	$5,000 Omaha Hi-Lo Split	79	Mike Matusow (1/2)	$148,520	Daniel Negreanu (0/1)	Results
30	May 16, 2002	$3,000 No Limit Hold'em	352	Randal Heeb (1/1)	$367,240	Sherman Burry	Results
31	May 17, 2002	$2,000 1/2 Hold'em, 1/2 Stud	144	Dan Heimiller (1/1)	$108,300	Ram Vaswani	Results
32	May 18, 2002	$5,000 Deuce to Seven Draw No Limit	32	Allen Cunningham (1/2)	$160,200	O'Neil Longson (0/1)	Results
33	May 18, 2002	$1,000 Seniors' No Limit Championship	396	Bill Swan (1/1)	$134,000	Mike Sexton (0/1)	Results
34	May 19, 2002	$1,500 Triple Draw Lowball Ace to Five	88	John Juanda (1/1)	$49,620	Paul Phillips	Results
35	May 20, 2002	$10,000 No Limit Hold'em Main Event	631	Robert Varkonyi	$2,000,000	Julian Gardner	Results

== Main Event ==
There were 631 entrants to the main event. Each paid $10,000 to enter, with the top 45 players finishing in the money. It was the largest poker tournament (by prize pool) ever played in a brick and mortar casino at the time. For the first time, the Main Event's top prize reached $2 million. Robert Varkonyi defeated Julian Gardner heads-up with a full house over a flush on the final hand.

=== Final table ===
Name	Number of chips (percentage of total)	WSOP Bracelets*	WSOP Cashes*	WSOP Earnings*
(United Kingdom) John Shipley	2,033,000 (32.2%)	0	5	$37,270
(United States) Russell Rosenblum	927,000 (14.7%)	0	0	0
(Russia) Ralph Perry	766,000 (12.1%)	0	6	$43,780
(United States) Robert Varkonyi	640,000 (10.1%)	0	0	0
(Vietnam) Minh Ly	614,000 (9.7%)	0	2	$62,155
(Republic of Ireland) Scott Gray	545,000 (8.6%)	0	1	$12,200
(United Kingdom) Julian Gardner	394,000 (6.2%)	0	0	0
(Vietnam) Tony Duong	231,000 (3.7%)	0	5	$224,000
(United States) Harley Hall	161,000 (2.6%)	0	2	$25,260

*Career statistics prior to the beginning of the 2002 Main Event.

=== Final table results ===
Place	Name	Prize
1st	Robert Varkonyi	$2,000,000
2nd	Julian Gardner	$1,100,000
3rd	Ralph Perry	$550,000
4th	Scott Gray	$281,480
5th	Harley Hall	$195,000
6th	Russell Rosenblum	$150,000
7th	John Shipley	$125,000
8th	Tony Duong	$100,000
9th	Minh Ly	$85,000

Note: Phil Hellmuth, as part of ESPN's broadcast team, during the first hour of their final table coverage said he would shave his head if Robert Varkonyi won the tournament. At the conclusion of the tournament, Hellmuth is seen having his head shaved.

=== In The Money Finishes ===
NB: This list is restricted to In The Money finishers with an existing Wikipedia entry.

Place	Name	Prize
13th	Martin de Knijff	$60,000
14th	Yoshio Nakano	$60,000
23rd	Phil Ivey	$40,000
24th	Minh Nguyen	$40,000
34th	Ross Boatman	$30,000
35th	Randy Holland	$30,000
36th	Tom Schneider	$30,000
42nd	David Sklansky	$20,000
43rd	Dan Heimiller	$20,000

== In pop culture ==
In "Casino Night", the 22nd episode of the second season of the American comedy television series The Office, it is revealed that Kevin Malone, a character on the show, won a World Series of Poker bracelet for No-Limit Deuce-Seven Draw in 2002.
