= Andy Nguyen =

Andy Nguyen may refer to:

- Anthony Nguyen, American poker dealer
- Kim Lee (drag queen) (1963–2020), Polish drag queen, born Andy Nguyen
