= Ralph Perry =

Ralph Perry may refer to:

- Ralph Barton Perry, American philosopher
- Ralph Perry (poker player)
