= Al Krux =

American poker player

World Series of Poker
- Bracelet: 1
- Final tables: 5
- Money finishes: 12
- Highest WSOP Main Event finish: 5th, 1994

World Poker Tour
- Title: None
- Final table: None
- Money finishes: 2

Al Krux (born in North Carolina) is an American professional poker player now based near Syracuse, New York.

Before turning to poker, Krux was a diamond merchant. He also once consulted with Native Americans about casinos and poker rooms. Krux is married with four children.

== Career ==
Krux has made the final table of the World Series of Poker (WSOP) $10,000 no limit hold'em main event on three occasions (6th in 1990, 5th in 1994 and 6th in 2004 where he was eliminated by eventual winner Greg "Fossilman" Raymer.)

Krux also won a WSOP bracelet in the 1996 $1,500 pot limit hold'em, defeating a final table that included "Miami" John Cernuto.

As of 2023, his total live tournament winnings exceed $1,500,000.

== Controversy ==
Krux, was charged with first-degree criminal possession of marijuana, along with his son Adam Krux, 32, who was also stopped in his vehicle with 15 pounds of pot inside. A subsequent search of their residences near Syracuse, New York, unearthed a further 90 marijuana plants and $5,000 in cash.
