= John Shipley =

John Shipley may refer to:

- John Shipley (poker player), English poker player
- John Shipley, Baron Shipley (born 1946), British politician
- John Shipley, former musician in The Specials
- John Shipley, character in the film The Stone Angel

== See also ==
- Jonathan Shipley, English bishop in Wales
