= Cordovez =

Cordovez is a surname. Notable people with the surname include:

- Diego Cordovez (born 1965), American poker player
- Ivette Cordovez (born 1979), Panamanian news presenter, actress, and model
- María Eugenia Cordovez (1934–2012), First Lady of Ecuador, 1984-88
