= Tomer Benvenisti =

American poker player (born 1960)

World Series of Poker
- Bracelet: None
- Final table: 1
- Highest WSOP Main Event finish: 5th, 2003

World Poker Tour
- Title: None
- Final table: 1
- Money finish: 1

Tomer Benvenisti (born 1960) is an American poker player. He made the final table at the 2003 World Series of Poker Main Event, earning $320,000 as an amateur, after playing the game since 1980. Fellow amateur Chris Moneymaker famously went on to win the final table this year and, like Moneymaker, Benevisti also qualified to the tournament through an online competition tournament. His total earnings stand at $384,206 as of June 19, 2025 and is placed 9,035 in the All-Time earnings list, with a best rank of 335.

== Career ==
=== 2003: WSOP Main Event ===
Tomer Benvenisti entered the 2003 WSOP Main Event as an amateur. This was his first major poker tournament and his $320,000 is the most he has earned in a single event to date. Benvenisti made the final table following Chris Moneymaker's knockout of Phil Ivey who finished 10th. He went on to finish 5th after being knocked out by Moneymaker.

=== 2004–2005: WPT Debut & Return to the WSOP ===
In April 2004, Tomer Benvenisti placed 2nd in the 2004 WPT $500 + 40 No Limit Hold'em tournament behind David Rasmussen. Benvenisti earned $7,474 at the event. Also in 2004, Benvenisti achieved his 2nd WSOP money finish in the Main event that year. He earned $10,000 and placed 190th behind Jacob Battenberg. This would be his final money finish at a WSOP Main Event, but he did participate in the 2005 $1,500 No Limit Hold'em tournament, placing 27th out of 780 entrants.

=== Post 2005 ===
Benvenisti has competed in a number of tournaments since 2005, with his highest earning being the WSOP Circuit $550 No Limit Hold'em tournament in 2008 where he finished 10th, earning $2,230. Most recently, he achieved a money finish at the 2020 South Point Recurring Tournaments in February of that year, earning $776 after finishing 3rd.

== Personal life ==
Benvenisti was born in Las Vegas, Nevada in 1960, and every tournament he has competed in has taken place in his the city. According to a 2011 interview, Benvenisti runs an Antarctic expedition company and is a stand-up comedian. His wife Joanne Benvenisti also plays poker after Tomer taught it to her.
