= Antanas Guoga =

Lithuanian businessman, poker player, politician, and philanthropist

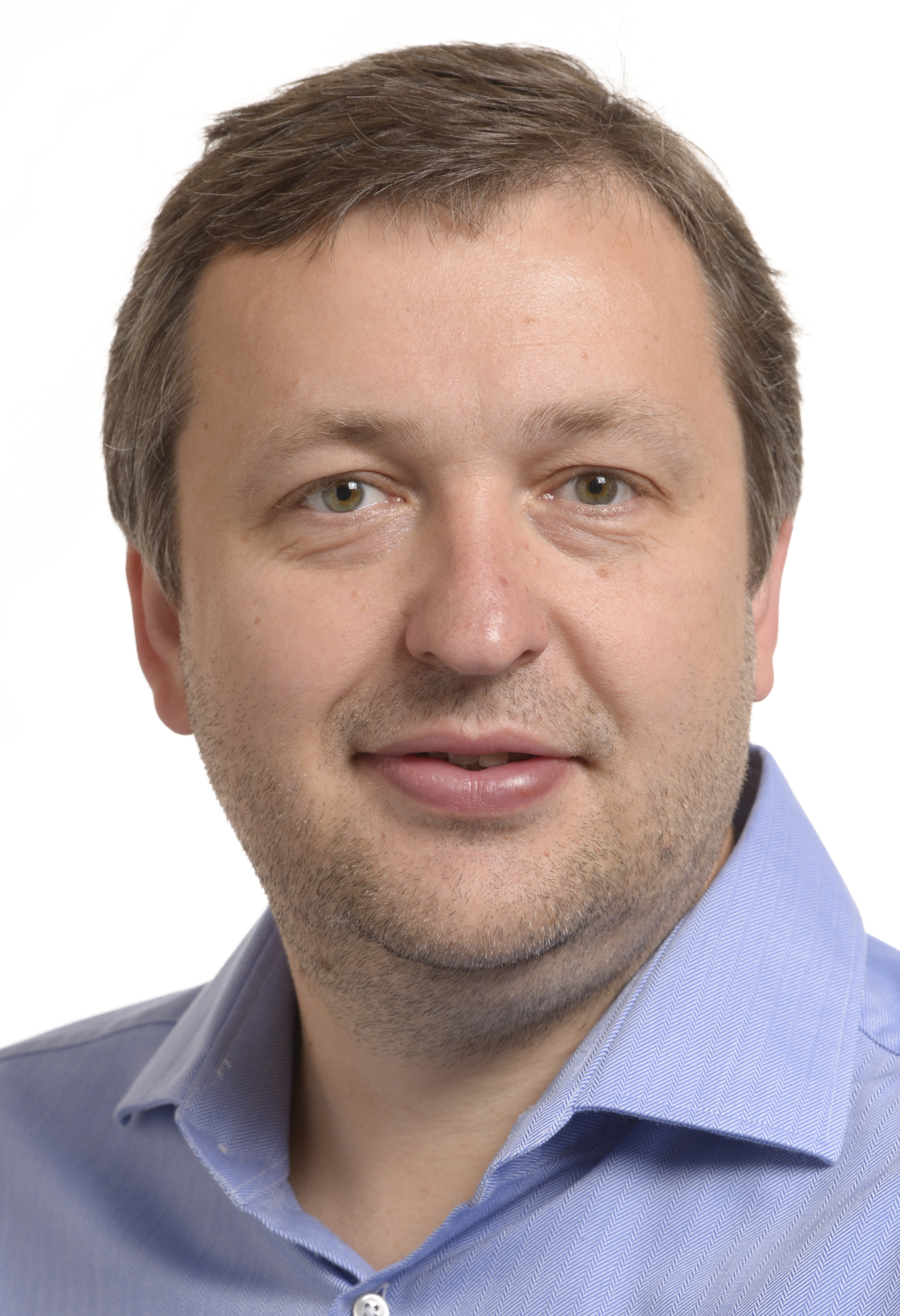
- Official portrait, 2014

Member of the Seimas
- In office 13 November 2020 – 19 February 2021
- Constituency: Multi-member

Member of the European Parliament for Lithuania
- In office 1 July 2014 – 1 July 2019
- Preceded by: Leonidas Donskis

Personal details
- Born: 17 December 1973 (age 52) Kaunas, Lithuanian SSR, Soviet Union (now Lithuania)
- Party: Liberal Movement (2013–2016); Independent (2016–2020); Labour Party (2020–)
- Spouse: Aistė Guogienė (m.2014)
- Children: Three sons, three daughters
- Profession: Poker player, entrepreneur, philanthropist, politician

Antanas Guoga (born 17 December 1973), more commonly known as Tony G, is a Lithuanian-Australian businessman, poker player, politician and philanthropist. In November 2020, he was elected to the Seimas of the Republic of Lithuania on the electoral list for the Labour Party.

During 2014–2019 he was a Member of the European Parliament for the Liberal Movement, and from 2016 the European Peoples Party. In May 2016, Guoga was the temporary leader of the Liberal Movement following the bribery scandal that prompted Eligijus Masiulis to step down after potentially corrupt activities.

== Biography ==
Guoga spent his childhood in Kaunas and in the Alytus district (Kalesninkai) in Lithuania. When he was 11 years old, he moved to Australia. Guoga lived in Melbourne, where he graduated from school at Christian Brothers' College, St Kilda (now St Mary's College, St Kilda) and had various jobs, including repairing sewing machines and washing cars.

== Politics ==
Guoga was a member of the Alliance of Liberals and Democrats group in the European Parliament until 4 October 2016. He became a member of the European People's Party which is the biggest party in the Parliament. He worked on a range of digital policies in the Internal Market and Consumer Protection Committee (IMCO). Guoga was actively involved in a number of Digital Single Market topics. Being an entrepreneur himself, Guoga worked for better conditions for European businesses, especially in the technology sector. These conditions include smarter regulations, less red tape, and policies that encourage innovation and entrepreneurship.

In 2015 Guoga was chosen as the Lithuanian representative in the POLITICO 28 list. The European affairs weekly newspaper chose one person from each of the European Union's 28 member-states who is "shaping, shaking and stirring Europe."

Guoga was elected as the vice-chairman of the European Parliament delegation to Armenia, Azerbaijan and Georgia, appointed as a member of the Euronest Parliamentary Assembly, a substitute member of the delegation for relations with Switzerland and Norway in the EU-Iceland Joint Parliamentary Committee and in the European Economic Area (EEA) Joint Parliamentary Committee. He was also a substitute member in the Employment and Social Affairs Committee (EMPL).

Guoga is Coder Dojo and entrepreneurship education ambassador in Lithuania. In 2016, he launched Coder Dojo movement in Lithuania and was one of the organisers of programming clubs for 7–17 years old youth in the country.

For four years in a row, 2015, 2016 and 2017 he organized the biggest ICT and entrepreneurship event in the Baltics #SWITCH! This event in 4 years has grown by 60% from 6000 participants in 2015 to 15000 in 2018. About 200 speakers from 16 countries already participated in the event. Among them was vice-president of the European Commission for the Digital Single Market Andrus Ansip, Vytenis Andriukaits, EC Commissioner and representatives of tech leaders such as Microsoft, Amazon, Google, Facebook, Uber, Allegro, Dash, Dell, Oath, Nasdaq, Mastercard, Tele2

In 2016–2017, Guoga was Chief Investment Officer to the Mayor of Vilnius, Remigijus Šimašius.

Guoga was nominated as a candidate for the European parliamentary elections at the summer congress of the Liberal Movement in the last week of June 2013.

Guoga was second on the list of the Lithuanian Liberal Movement in the elections to the European Parliament in 2014, and was elected as the MEP with 97,907 votes ending on top of the list.

After the corruption allegations of Eligijus Masiulis, Guoga became a temporary chairman of the Liberal Movement. After public criticism by the party members, Guoga left the party on 17 May 2016.

On 9 March 2019, Guoga announced that he would seek re-election to the European Parliament with the Lithuanian Centre Party. The party received 5.13% of the national vote and did not receive any representatives in the European Parliament.

In November 2020 he was elected to Lithuanian national parliament, the Seimas, as a member of the electoral list of the Labour Party He resigned his seat three months later, after falling out with the chairman of the Labour Party Viktor Uspaskich.

== Poker ==
Tony G
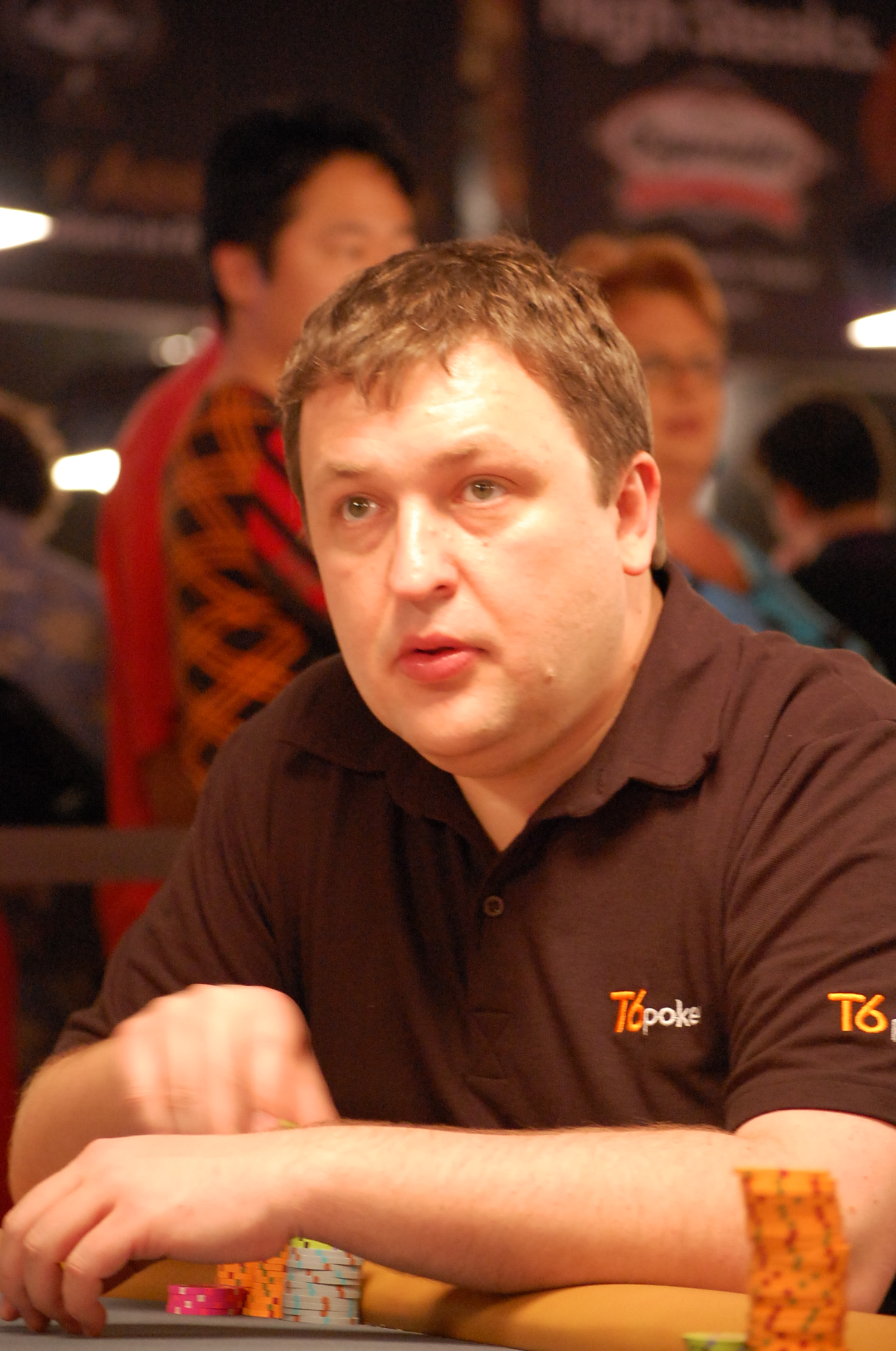
- Tony G at the 2008 World Series of Poker
- Born: 17 December 1973 (age 52)

World Series of Poker
- Bracelet: None
- Money finishes: 15
- Highest WSOP Main Event finish: None

World Poker Tour
- Title: None
- Final tables: 2
- Money finishes: 4

As a child, Guoga was the Rubik's Cube champion of Lithuania before moving to Melbourne, Australia, at the age of 11. He has played poker since the age of 18, and is known for his outlandish table talk and frequent attempts at intimidation of his opponents. He had a fifth-place finish in the World Poker Tour Grand Prix de Paris 2003. He finished in the money twice at the 2004 World Series of Poker in Seven-card stud and Pot Limit Texas hold 'em tournaments. Three months later he earned his then biggest tournament money finish in the WPT Grand Prix de Paris 2004, where his second-place finish to England's Surinder Sunar earned him $414,478. He finished on the bubble later in the same month at the WPT 2004 Mirage Poker Showdown. On 7 August 2005 he won the £5,000 no-limit Texas hold 'em Main Event of the European Poker Championships, earning £260,000. Later in 2005, he made the final table of the World Speed Poker Open.

In 2006, he won the WPT Bad Boys of Poker II event when his 10♦ 8♦ outdrew Mike Matusow's K♠ K♥ on a board of 8♠ 10♠ 2♥ 9♥ Q♣. He wore a kimono throughout the event to promote poker in Japan. Also in 2006, he finished second to Yosh Nakano while representing Australia in the inaugural Intercontinental Poker Championship, taking down $150,000. True to his reputation, Tony G launched many verbal assaults against his opponents, most notably when he eliminated Russian Ralph Perry in fourth place. Tony G started to provoke Perry when he was deciding how to play his hand before the flop. When Perry called Tony G's all-in with a worse hand (K-J), Tony G proceeded to ridicule and lecture him. Tony's comments were so scathing that it prompted commentator Gabe Kaplan to quip "I think Tony G is speaking more like a Lithuanian than an Australian" and "Tony G could single-handedly reignite the Cold War". Guoga was more respectful of some other players, such as Doyle Brunson, calling Doyle his idol after eliminating him.

In November 2006, he won the Asian Poker Tour event held in Singapore, walking away with $451,700, half of which he indicated he will give to Asian and Australian charities to be nominated by Betfair. In February 2007, he appeared on the NBC television program Poker After Dark, coming in third place behind winner Phil Ivey. In November of the same year, he won a tournament in Moscow, earning $205,000. Often telling his opponents that he has a "big heart", Guoga claims that he left all of his prize money with the officials to give to Russian orphanages, having been inspired to do so by Barry Greenstein's habit of donating all his poker tournament winnings to charity. In January 2008, Guoga received the Shining World Leadership Award in Melbourne Australia. In the 2008 WSOP, he finished sixth in a $5,000 No Limit Deuce to Seven Draw tournament for $78,075.

In 2009, Guoga was a founding inductee into the Australian Poker Hall of Fame. In May of that year, he had a third-place finish in the European High Roller Championship at the EPT in Monte Carlo for €420,000.

On 23 February 2010, in Vilnius, Guoga established the Lithuanian Poker Federation.

Tony G occasionally plays high-stakes cash game poker. In 2018, he took part in the PartyPoker "The Big Game" High-Stakes PLO cash game alongside poker pros like Isildur1, Sam Trickett and casino owner Rob Yong.

In October 2019, Guoga had a fourth-place finish in the €250,000 No Limit Hold'em - Super High Roller event at the 2019 WSOP Europe in Rozvadov. He won €799,045. In August 2021, Guoga won a $100,000 No Limit Short Deck Hold'em event at the Super High Roller Bowl in Kyrenia for $1,196,000. In May 2022, he earned his largest live tournament cash with a runner-up finish in the Triton Poker Series for $1,389,436.

As of 2023, his total live tournament winnings exceed $11,200,000. His 20 cashes at the WSOP account for $1,886,714 of those winnings.

== Other sports ==
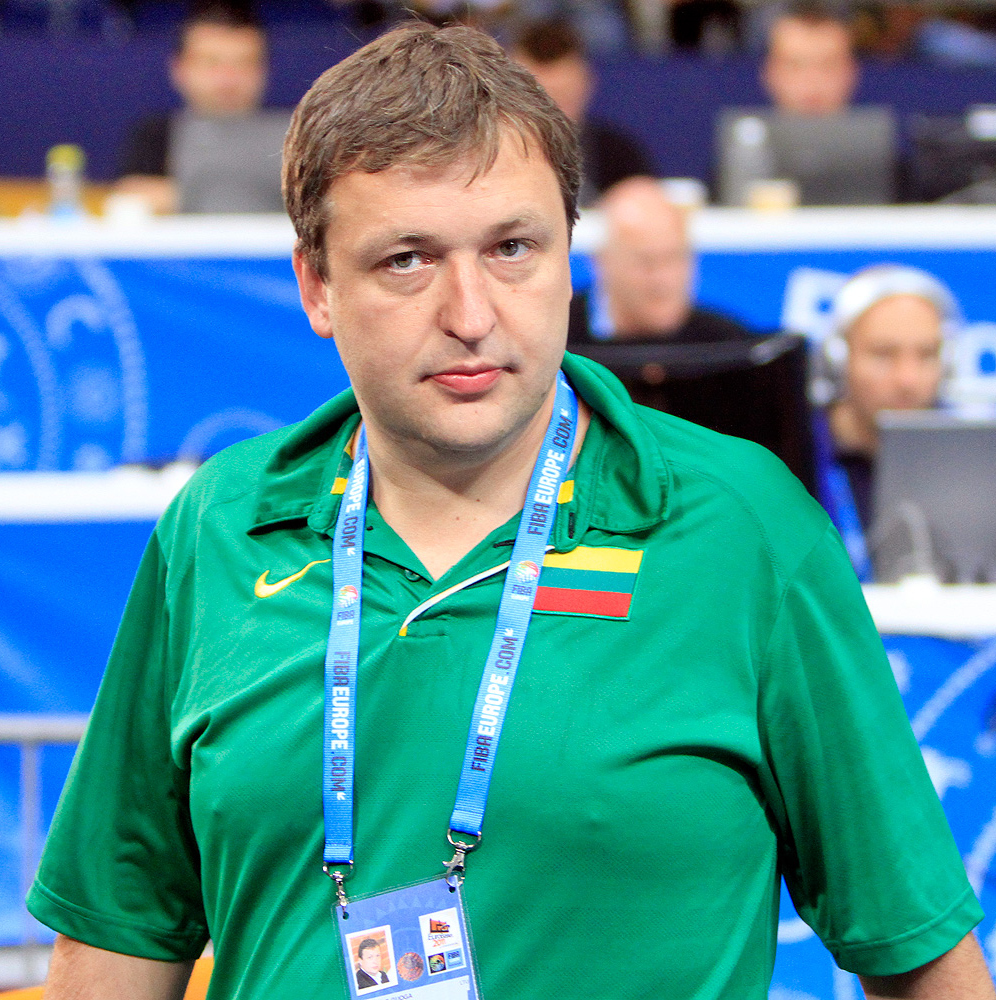
Guoga with Lithuania men's national basketball team

Guoga is currently a major sponsor of the Lithuanian Basketball Federation. When the country's national team failed to directly qualify for the 2010 FIBA World Championship in Turkey and had to apply for a wild-card entry, he paid a large share of the application fee of €500,000. The team was chosen for the tournament, and won the bronze medal with TONYBET printed on their jerseys. He was the national basketball team's manager from 2010 until 2012 and served as the vice-president of the Lithuanian Basketball Federation. He was also the main sponsor of BC Prienai, a professional basketball club.

In 2014, Guoga became the vice-president of the Lithuanian Rowing Federation.

== Business ==
Guoga is director and CEO of Cypherpunk Holdings.

== Controversy ==
=== Paradise Papers ===
In November 2017 an investigation conducted by the International Consortium of Investigative Journalism cited his name in the list of politicians named in "Paradise Papers" allegations.

== Achievements ==
- 2004 WPT – Grand Prix de Paris – 2nd place
- 2005 European Poker Championships – 1st place
- 2006 Intercontinental Poker Championship – Grand Final – 2nd place
- 2006 Betfair Asian Poker Tour – 1st place
- 2007 World Series Of Poker – Europe, London – 3rd place
- 2007 Moscow Millions, Main Event – 1st place
- 2008 Shining World Leadership Award
- 2008 PartyPoker Premier League Poker III – 2nd place
- 2009 40th World Series of Poker (WSOP) 2009, Anniversary Event – 10th place
- 2009 EPT – Grand Final (Monte Carlo), High Roller Championship – 3rd place
- 2010 Aussie Millions Poker Championship, A$100k Challenge – 5th place
- 2010 The Poker Lounge, Episode 10 - 1st place
- 2010 WPT London High Roller – 2nd place
- 2011 delfi.lt readers recognized him as the Lithuanian of the World
- 2011 Verslo švyturys Award
- 2012 Aussie Millions Poker Championship, A$100k Challenge – 4th place
- 2012 PartyPoker Premier League Poker V – 5th place
- 2015 POLITICO 28 list (28 people from the European Union’s 28 member states who are transforming European politics)
- 2016 A. Guoga was included in the POLITICO 40 list as one of the most influential MEPs.
- 2017 MEP Antanas Guoga, the only member of the European Parliament and Lithuanian to be included in the TOP 200 list of Philanthropists and Social Entrepreneurs, compiled by the positive content portal Richtopia.

== Personal life ==
Since 2014, Guoga has been married to Aistė Šlapokaitė, a former psychology student and a photo model for clothing brands like Armani Jeans, Prada and Max Mara. Guoga and Šlapokaitė met during her 30th birthday celebrations in a Vilnius night club. Together they have two sons (Herkus, born in 2015 in Brussels and Tauras, born in 2016 in Vilnius). Guoga also has a son and three daughters from previous relationships.
