= Melissa Hayden =

Melissa Hayden may refer to:

- Melissa Hayden (dancer) (1923–2006), Canadian dancer
- Melissa Hayden (actress) (born 1967), American actress
- Melissa Hayden (poker player), American poker player
