= Men Nguyen =

Vietnamese-American poker player (born 1954)

Mến Nguyễn
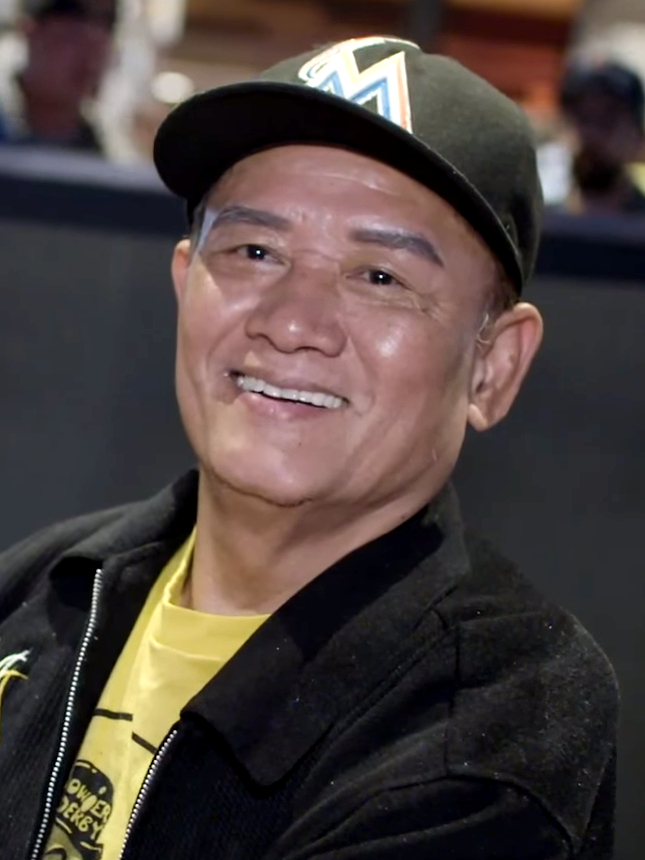
- Nguyen in 2018
- Nickname: The Master
- Born: 1954 (age 71–72); Phan Thiet, Vietnam

World Series of Poker
- Bracelets: 7
- Money finishes: 89
- Highest WSOP Main Event finish: 4th, 1996

World Poker Tour
- Title: None
- Final tables: 5
- Money finishes: 17

Men "The Master" Nguyen (Nguyễn Văn Mến; born 1954 in Phan Thiet, Vietnam) is a Vietnamese-American professional poker player.

== Personal life ==
In 1967, he dropped out of school at age 13 and became a bus driver to help support his family. In early 1978, a staunch anti-Communist, he escaped from the Communist regime of Vietnam by boat and sailed with 87 compatriots to Pulau Besar in Malaysia. In 1978, he received political asylum from the United States and settled in Los Angeles, California. In 1986, he became an American citizen. In 1984 he went on a junket to Las Vegas and played poker for the first time in his life. He continued to go every weekend and lose hundreds of dollars, earning him the nickname "Money Machine". However, he quickly mastered the game, winning his first tournament in 1987. With his poker earnings, he opened a dry cleaning business and furniture store, but sold them in 1990 because they took too much of his time and didn't make enough money. Through these businesses he would, however, meet and work with many Vietnamese people who would fall under his tutelage.

Nguyen met his future wife, Van, in Vietnam. He eventually brought her to the United States, where they settled in Bell Gardens, California. Men and Van have three children. Van Nguyen learned poker from her husband. She won the World Poker Tour Celebrity Invitational in March 2008, becoming the first woman to ever win a WPT mixed event.

== Professional poker career ==
Nguyen has over 475 finishes in the money, and has won more than 95 tournaments. Nguyen is known for tutoring players, many of whom go on to be successful in their own right, including his cousins David Pham, Minh Nguyen, and his wife Van Nguyen. Men receives a portion of some of his students' winnings. In 1991 one of his students gave him the nickname "The Master," and now he is widely known as "Men the Master." He donates a portion of the money he earns through tournaments and tutoring to charities in Vietnam, and in 1996, with the earnings from his final-table finish in the World Series of Poker, built a kindergarten in Vietnam.

Nguyen won the Card Player Magazine Player of the Year award in 1997, 2001, 2003 and 2005 and is widely regarded as one of the most accomplished tournament players in the world. While allegations have been made regarding Nguyen's possible involvement with tournament cheating, nothing has been proven and Nguyen has consistently denied any such actions. As of 2022, his total live tournament earnings exceed $11,000,000. His cashes at WSOP events account for over $4,100,000 of those winnings.

Nguyen has won seven WSOP bracelets over three decades.

World Series of Poker bracelets
Year	Tournament	Prize (US$)
1992	$1,500 Seven-card stud	$120,600
1995	$2,500 Seven-card stud hi-lo	$96,000
1995	$2,500 Limit Texas hold 'em	$110,000
1996	$2,500 Omaha hi-lo	$110,000
2003	$5,000 Seven-card stud	$178,560
2003	$1,500 Ace to Five Triple Draw Lowball	$43,520
2010	$10,000 Seven-card stud	$394,807
