= Travis Jonas =

American poker player

- Born: 1970 or 1971 (age 55–56)

World Series of Poker
- Bracelet: 1
- Money finish: 1

Travis Jonas (born 1970 or 1971) is an American poker dealer who won a bracelet in the 2001 Casino Employees Championship event at the World Series of Poker.

After winning the WSOP bracelet, Jonas cashed in three events at The Third Annual Jack Binion World Poker Open in 2002.

In 2004, he came in 2nd place winning over $46,000 at the $300 Limit Poker Hold'em event at the LA Poker Classic. He also finished in sixth place at the 2004 Bellagio Five-Star World Poker Classic/WPT Championship, Las Vegas in the $2,500 Limit Hold'em event.

All of Jonas's major cashes have occurred in Limit Hold'em. After winning his WSOP bracelet, Jonas was asked what he was going to do next. He responded, "I'm coming back to deal [at the WSOP] on Sunday."

Jonas's lifetime winnings exceed $139,000.

== World Series of Poker bracelets ==
Year	Tournament	Prize (US$)
2001	$500 Casino Employees Limit Hold'em	$40,200

At the time of his winning the bracelet he was 30 years old.
