= Barb Rugolo =

American poker player

World Series of Poker
- Bracelet: 1
- Money finish: 1
- Highest WSOP Main Event finish: None

Barb Rugolo was a World Series of Poker (WSOP) champion in the 2003 $1,000 Ladies - Hold'em and Limit 7 Card Stud.

As of 2008, her total WSOP tournament winnings exceed $40,700.

== World Series of Poker bracelets ==
| Year | Tournament | Prize (US$) |
|---|---|---|
| 2003 | $1,000 Ladies - Hold'em and Limit 7 Card Stud | $40,700 |
