= Joe Awada =

Lebanese poker player (born 1959)

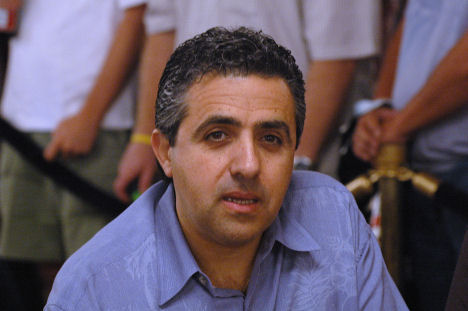
- Awada in the 2006 World Series of Poker
- Nickname: Gentle Joe
- Born: Yehia Awada; 12 March 1959 (age 67); Beirut, Lebanon

World Series of Poker
- Bracelet: 1
- Money finishes: 11
- Highest WSOP Main Event finish: None

World Poker Tour
- Title: None
- Final table: 1
- Money finishes: 2

Joe Awada (born Yehia Awada; Arabic: يحيى عواضة ; born 12 March 1959, in Beirut, Lebanon) is a professional poker player, based in Las Vegas, Nevada.

Awada moved from Lebanon to the United States in his early teenage years, working as a juggler, eventually touring with the Harlem Globetrotters. After a car accident, he began working as a casino dealer and eventually became a regular on the poker tournament circuit.

At the 2004 World Series of Poker (WSOP), Awada finished second to Scott Fischman in the $1,500 no limit hold'em event. Awada would have won the gold bracelet in that tournament were it not for a bad beat on the river that kept Fischman alive—Fischman won the tournament on the very next hand. Later in the same WSOP, Awada won a gold bracelet in the $5,000 seven-card stud event, defeating Marcel Lüske. Three months later, he made the final table of the World Poker Tour (WPT) third season event won by Doyle Brunson. Awada nearly went back to back, finishing fifth in the seven card stud championship the following year. The final table included John Phan, Chip Jett, Keith Sexton and eventual champion Jan Sørensen.

Awada has won an event on the Ultimate Poker Challenge and made the final table of a World Series of Poker circuit event.

As of 2018, his total live tournament winnings exceed $1,040,000. His 9 cashes as the WSOP account for $580,759 of those winnings.
