= Frederick Narciso =

American poker player

- Nickname: Quietlike
- Born: 1982 or 1983 (age 43–44)

World Series of Poker
- Bracelet: 1
- Money finishes: 2
- Highest WSOP Main Event finish: None

Frederick "Eric" Narciso (born 1982 or 1983) is a dealer at the Orleans Casino in Las Vegas, Nevada. In 2007, he entered a $90 satellite held by his employer to gain entry into the 2007 World Series of Poker $500 Casino Employees World Poker Championship. It was in this event that he won $104,701 and a WSOP bracelet. He finished in 27th place in the same event in 2006.

Narciso is an aspiring rap artist, having released an album, "Cuz Actionz Speak LouderThan Wordz."

As of 2008 he has tournament winning in excess of $145,000.

== World Series of Poker bracelets ==
Year	Tournament	Prize (US$)
2007	$500 Casino Employees Championship Event	$104,701
