= David Warga =

American poker player

World Series of Poker
- Bracelets: 2
- Money finishes: 5
- Highest WSOP Main Event finish: None

David Warga is a poker dealer who won a bracelet in the 2002 Casino Employees Championship event at the World Series of Poker. He won a bracelet at the 2010 World Series of Poker in the $1,500 Seven Card Stud Hi-Low-8 or Better.

As of 2011, Warga's lifetime winnings exceed $280,000.

== World Series of Poker bracelets ==
Year	Tournament	Prize (US$)
2002	$500 Casino Employees Limit Hold'em	$47,300
2010	$1,500 Seven Card Stud Hi-Low-8 or Better	$208,682
