= Marcel Lüske =

Dutch poker player (born 1953)

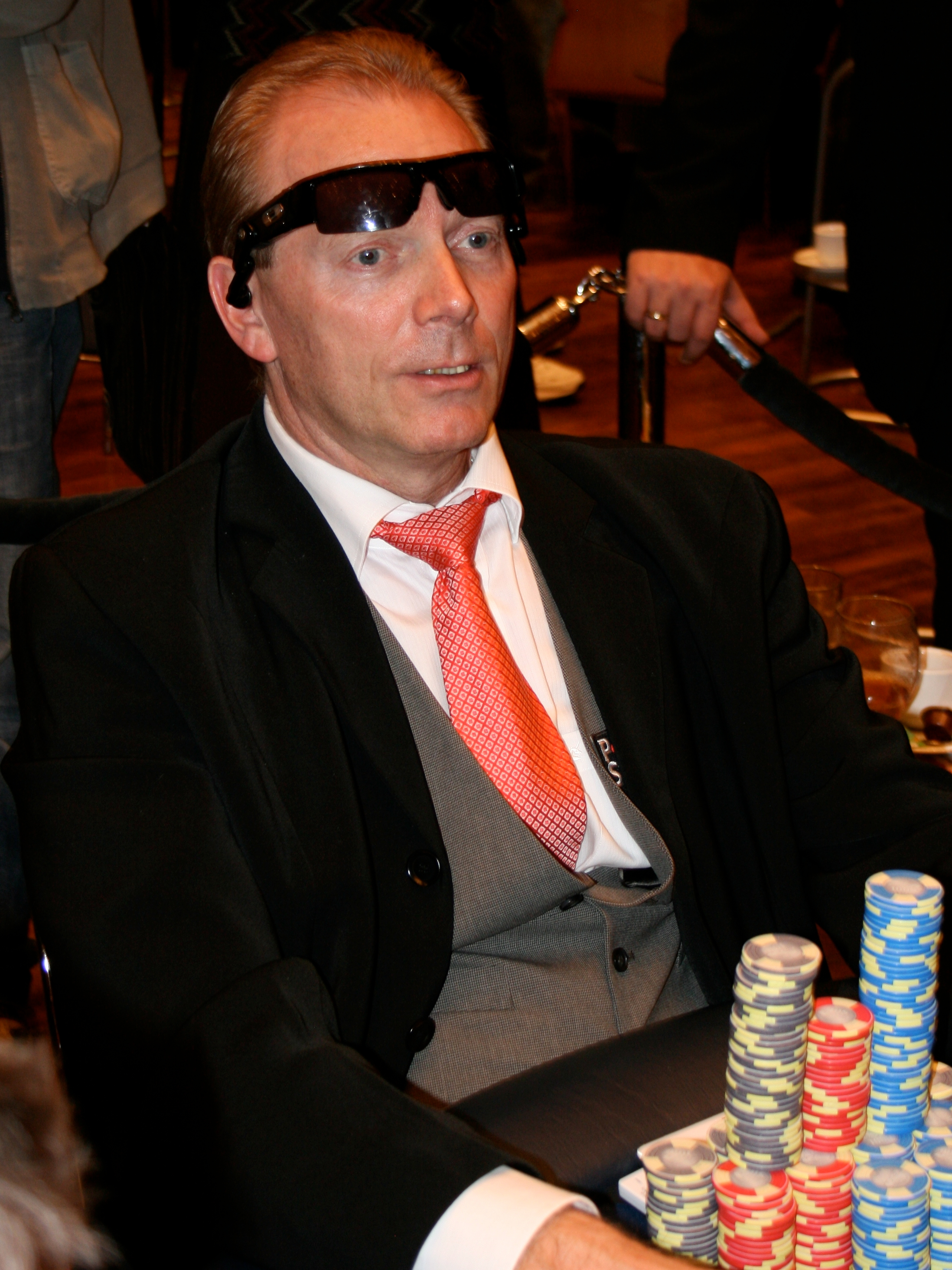
- Marcel Lüske playing in the European Poker Tour in 2008
- Nickname: The Flying Dutchman
- Born: 23 March 1953 (age 73); Amsterdam, Netherlands

World Series of Poker
- Bracelet: None
- Money finishes: 40
- Highest WSOP Main Event finish: 10th, 2004

World Poker Tour
- Title: None
- Final table: None
- Money finishes: 5

European Poker Tour
- Title: None
- Final tables: 3
- Money finishes: 9

Marcel Lüske (Amsterdam, Netherlands 23 March 1953) is a Dutch professional poker player. He finished 10th in the 2004 WSOP Main Event. Lüske is a mentor to and encourages the development of younger poker players.

== Early life ==
Lüske's father was a butcher and a boxer, and he named Marcel after his favorite French pugilist, Marcel Cerdan. He grew up in the Netherlands, where he wanted to be a singer, but he ended up at the center of his country's government, The Hague, working for customs. He moved on to working in a nightclub, owning a bar in the Amsterdam marketplace, and opening a card club in Antwerp, Belgium. As a hobby, he and his brothers picked up five-card stud and played in their downtime at the market. Lüske's card skills among the local vendors led them to suggest him to enter a $1,000 buy-in tournament in Prague. As a result of his successful playing, he won over $40,000 and turned professional. He began flying from city to city to play poker, earning himself the nickname "The Flying Dutchman".

== Poker career ==
=== World Series of Poker ===
Lüske had his first major breakthrough at the World Series of Poker in a 2002 $5,000 Omaha Hi/Lo Split tournament. He finished 3rd for $44,560. Lüske finished in 14th place in the 2003 World Series of Poker (WSOP) Main Event, for which he earned $65,000, and 10th place in the 2004 WSOP Main Event, for which he won $373,000. These achievements in the 2003 and 2004 WSOP Main Events are similar to Dan Harrington's back-to-back final table appearance in the same years, and it was Harrington who eliminated Lüske in 2004. Luske's 10th-place finish in the 2004 Main Event for $373,000 is his largest tournament cash to date. Lüske was runner-up to Joe Awada in the 2004 $5,000 Seven-card stud tournament, for which he earned $120,800. In the 2017 World Series of Poker Main Event, Luske made a deep run to finish in 23rd place out of 7,221 entries, for which he won $263,532. His 23rd-place finish in the 2017 Main Event is his highest since finishing in 10th place in 2004.

Lüske has cashed at the WSOP 40 times for over $1.7 million.

=== Other poker activities ===
Lüske has won the European Poker Awards Player of the Year in 2001 and 2004. In 2005, he won the €10,000 Hall of Fame Poker Classic in Paris and took home €119,000. In 2006 Lüske made the European Poker Tour Championship Grand Final, finishing 7th. Also in 2006, Lüske won a $3,000 buy-in event at the Fourth Annual Five-Star World Poker Classic in Las Vegas. He won $315,630, which is his second-largest cash.

As of 2023, Lüske's total live tournament winnings exceed $5 million.

In early 2007, Lüske produced a TV show called Veronica Poker with fellow poker professional Noah Boeken, in which Dutch celebrities were taught to play poker. He also appeared in the show Poker Kings NL in which Boeken and Lüske filmed while attending poker tournaments. Later, he appeared in the show Celebrity Poker on Tien television channel.

Also in 2007, Lüske cofounded the Federation Internationale de Poker Association (FIDPA) with American poker pro Michelle Lau to promote tournament fairness and uniformity worldwide. Lüske and Lau began FIDPA's mission with the creation of a book entitled The International Poker Rules. Its most recent update was published on 5 April 2018.

Lüske is known for his sharp dress sense at the table and his ever-present sunglasses. He has gained some notoriety for being eccentric with his shades, occasionally sporting odd pairs but more often wearing his sunglasses upside-down. He is a black belt in karate.
