= Chris Gros =

American poker player

World Series of Poker
- Bracelet: 1
- Money finishes: 3
- Highest WSOP Main Event finish: None

Chris Gros, Senior Manager of Poker Operations at Nagaworld in Phnom Penh, Cambodia, won a World Series of Poker bracelet at the 2006 $500 Casino Employees No Limit Hold'em tournament.

Chris' winning hand was a 3 of clubs and a 4 of hearts, when the flop came up 3-3-8, he succeeded in getting his opponent to move all-in. The 2006 Employee Championship was the largest employee only event in WSOP history.

When Chris won, he says that his first thought was, "Oh my God, I don't have to worry about a mortgage payment for a looong time." Upon thinking about it, Gros decided, "it would be silly to put money in the house when I can invest in other things-like poker."

== World Series of Poker bracelets ==
Year	Tournament	Prize (US$)
2006	$500 Casino Employees No Limit Hold'em	$127,496
