= Andrew Cohen (poker player) =

American poker player

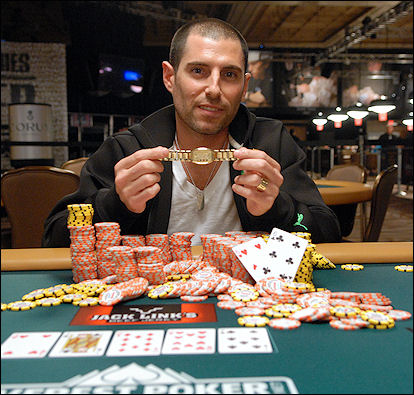
- Cohen after winning Event 1 of the 2009 World Series of Poker
- Born: c. 1969 (age 56–57)

World Series of Poker
- Bracelet: 1
- Money finish: 1
- Highest WSOP Main Event finish: None

Andrew Cohen (born c. 1969) is an American bartender at the Palms Casino Resort in Las Vegas, who won a World Series of Poker bracelet at the 2009 $500 Casino Employees No Limit Hold'em. Cohen entered the 2009 WSOP intending to participate in five events, 3 $1,500 events, the $1,000 "Stimilus Special", and the $500 Casino Employees No Limit Hold'em events. After winning his bracelet, he indicated a desire to participate in the Main Event. Cohen was the first bracelet winner ever honored with a new tradition at the WSOP, the bracelet was presented at center stage with the winner's national anthem being performed.

Cohen said, "I told all these guys here, it's not about the money to me, and I'm not even a rich guy. I'm a bartender. And, I don't care about the money. You can always get money. It's the bracelet that counts."

Prior to the 2009 WSOP, Cohen had played in seven WSOP tournaments but failed to cash in any of them. At the 2007 WSOP, Cohen was responsible for busting ten-time bracelet winner and Poker Hall of Famer Doyle Brunson in the Main Event.

== World Series of Poker bracelets ==
Year	Tournament	Prize (US$)
2009	$500 Casino Employees No Limit Hold'em	$83,778
