= Robert Varkonyi =

American poker player

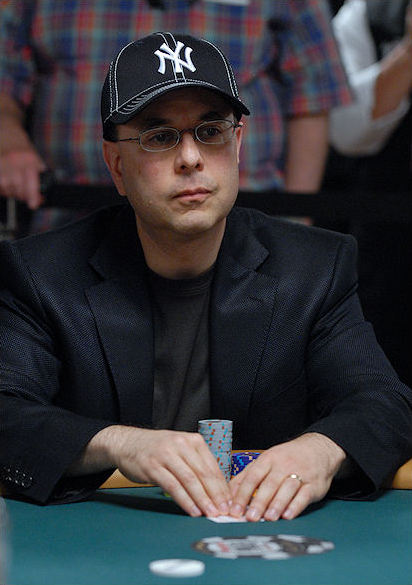
- Varkonyi in 2009

World Series of Poker
- Bracelet: 1
- Final table: 1
- Money finishes: 5
- Highest WSOP Main Event finish: Winner, 2002

Robert Varkonyi is an American poker player, best known for winning the Main Event of the 2002 World Series of Poker.

== Biography ==
Varkonyi first started playing poker as an undergraduate at the Massachusetts Institute of Technology. He is most well known for winning the 2002 World Series of Poker Main Event, taking the $2 million prize. In the final hand, Varkonyi's Q♦ 10♠ defeated Julian Gardner's J♣ 8♣ on a board of Q♣ 4♣ 4♠ 10♦ 10♣, resulting in Varkonyi's full house defeating Gardner's flush.

He cashed in the main event in 2007, finishing in 177th place in a field of over six thousand players, winning $51,398.

In the 2009 WSOP, Varkonyi competed with 19 other former WSOP main event world champions in the first ever Champions Invitational tournament. He finished the tournament in second place, being defeated in heads-up play by 1983 world champion Tom McEvoy.

At the 2011 WSOP, Varkonyi cashed in the Main Event for the third time in his poker career. He finished in 514th place in a field of 6,865 players, earning $23,876.

At the 2024 WSOP, Varkonyi cashed in the Main Event for the fourth time in his poker career. He finished in 852nd place in a field of 10,112 players, earning $25,000.

As of 2025, Varkonyi's lifetime live tournament winnings exceed $2,300,000. His four Main Event cashes at the WSOP total $2,100,274.

=== World Series of Poker Bracelets ===
Year	Tournament	Prize (US$)
2002	$10,000 No Limit Hold'em World Championship	$2,000,000
