= Hung Doan =

American poker player

World Series of Poker
- Bracelet: 1
- Money finishes: 2
- Highest WSOP Main Event finish: None

Hung Doan is an American poker player and a World Series of Poker bracelet winner.

She was a World Series of Poker champion in the 2004 $1,000 Ladies - Limit Hold'em event. As of 2014, her total live tournament winnings exceed $70,000.

== World Series of Poker bracelets ==
Year	Tournament	Prize (US$)
2004	$1,000 Ladies - Limit Hold'em	$58,530
