= Phi Nguyen =

Vietnamese-American poker player

World Series of Poker
- Bracelets: 2
- Money finishes: 15
- Highest WSOP Main Event finish: 26th, 2008

World Poker Tour
- Title: None
- Final table: None
- Money finishes: 5

Hung "Phi" Nguyen is a Vietnamese-American professional poker player who is a two-time World Series of Poker bracelet winner with multiple live tournament results adding up to over $1.8 million in career earnings.

== World Series of Poker ==
Nguyen has multiple cashes at the World Series of Poker (WSOP) including two bracelets, his first was in the 2003 World Series of Poker $2,500 No-Limit Hold'em event, earning $222,800, with a final table made up of fellow professional poker players T. J. Cloutier (9th), David Singer (7th), Steve Zolotow (6th), Tom Jacobs (5th), Kenna James (4th), Mike 'The Mouth' Matusow (3rd) and Jim Miller who Nguyen beat during heads-up play.

Nguyen then earned $180,000 and his second WSOP bracelet at the 2004 World Series of Poker $1,500 No-Limit Hold'em Shootout event with a final table made up of poker players including Daniel Negreanu (9th), J. C. Tran (7th), John Juanda (5th) and Kirill Gerasimov whom he beat during heads-up play.

Nguyen has also finished in the money twice at the WSOP Main Event; at the 2006 World Series of Poker he finished in 164th place out of 8,773 entries, earning $47,006 and then two years later at the 2008 World Series of Poker he finished in 26th place out of 6,844 entries, earning $257,334.

=== World Series of Poker bracelets ===
Year	Event	Prize Money
2003	$2,500 No Limit Hold'em	$222,800
2004	$1,500 No-Limit Hold'em Shootout	$180,000

== World Poker Tour ==
Nguyen has cashed five times at the World Poker Tour (WPT) with over $105,000 in earnings; his highest placement was in the 2003 Legends of Poker in Los Angeles, earning $30,900.

As of 2010, his total live tournament winnings exceed $1,800,000. His 15 cashes at the WSOP account for $802,028 of those winnings.
