= Yoshio Nakano =

American poker player

- Nickname: None

World Series of Poker
- Bracelet: None
- Money finishes: 7
- Highest WSOP Main Event finish: 14th, 2002

World Poker Tour
- Title: None
- Final table: None
- Money finishes: 3

Yoshio (Yosh) Nakano is a professional poker player and entrepreneur who resides in Long Beach, California.

He has played professionally for more than three decades and is a long-time regular at high-stakes poker tables at the Bicycle Casino in Los Angeles. He was a co-founder and a "resident pro" at the online poker site PokerBlue, before it closed down in March 2007.

He represented Japan in the inaugural Intercontinental Poker Championship. Nakano defeated Lithuanian Tony G two out of three matches at the heads-up final table to win the US$350,000 first prize. In the final hand, Nakano's 3♣ 3♦ held up against Tony G's K♣ 9♠ on a board of A♠ A♣ J♣ 7♥ 3♥.

As of 2026, Nakano's total live tournament earnings exceeded US$671,300, ranking him 4,773rd on the global live poker money list; his highest recorded single cash remains the $350,000 first prize from the 2006 Intercontinental Poker Championship.
