= Positively Fifth Street =

2004 memoir of World Series of Poker

Positively Fifth Street: Murderers, Cheetahs, and Binion's World Series of Poker
- Author: James McManus
- Language: English
- Subject: Gambling
- Genre: Memoir
- Publication date: 2003
- Publication place: United States

Positively Fifth Street: Murderers, Cheetahs, and Binion's World Series of Poker is a memoir published in 2003 by Chicago area author James McManus set during the 2000 World Series of Poker.

On assignment from Harper's Magazine, McManus was sent to Las Vegas to cover the trial of Rick Tabish and Sandy Murphy, who were accused of murdering Binion's Horseshoe casino executive Ted Binion. The trial coincided with the 2000 WSOP, which McManus entered. He won a satellite tournament into the Main Event, and reached the final table, placing fifth. The book is a two-track memoir of his coverage of the trial interspersed with and finally subsumed by the poker tournament.

The book's title was inspired by Bob Dylan's 1965 single "Positively 4th Street".
