= Minh Nguyen =

Vietnamese-American poker player

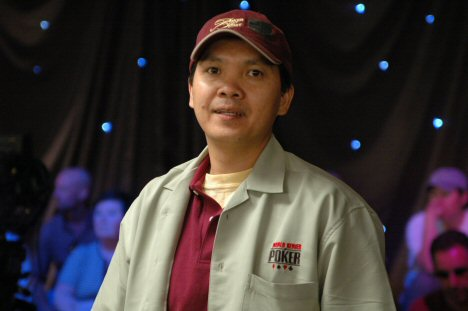
- Nguyen in the 2005 World Series of Poker
- Nickname: Pokerhost
- Born: May 15

World Series of Poker
- Bracelets: 2
- Money finishes: 26
- Highest WSOP Main Event finish: 11th, 2003

World Poker Tour
- Money finishes: 4

Minh Van Nguyen (Vietnamese: Nguyễn Văn Minh; born May 15), a Vietnamese American professional poker player, is a two-time World Series of Poker bracelet winner residing in Bell Gardens, California.

Nguyen finished 24th in the $10,000 no limit hold'em Main Event at the 2002 World Series of Poker (WSOP), earning $40,000. He went on to win a bracelet at the 2003 World Series of Poker in the $1,500 seven-card stud hi-lo split event, and would finish 11th in the Main Event later that year.

Nguyen earned a second WSOP bracelet at the 2004 WSOP in the $1,500 pot limit hold'em event, and finished 2nd to Mark Seif in the $1,500 no limit hold'em event at the 2005 WSOP.

Nguyen finished in 7th place at the inaugural Doyle Brunson North American Poker Championship, earning $60,000. He finished in 8th place at the 2005 World Poker Finals, earning $172,800.

== World Series of Poker bracelets ==
Year	Tournament	Prize (US$)
2003	$1,500 Seven-card stud Hi-Lo Split	$106,020
2004	$1,500 Pot Limit Hold'em	$155,420

As of 2009, his total live tournament winnings have exceeded $2,100,000. His 26 cashes at the WSOP account for $1,033,671 of those winnings.
