= Jimmy Cha =

South Korean Go and poker player (born 1951)

- Born: Ch'a Min-su; January 15, 1951 (age 75); Seoul, South Korea

World Series of Poker
- Bracelet: None
- Money finishes: 7
- Highest WSOP Main Event finish: None

World Poker Tour
- Title: None
- Final table: None
- Money finishes: 25

Jimmy Cha (Korean: 차민수; Hanja: 車敏洙, born January 15, 1951), also known as Ch'a Min-su, is a South Korean professional go and avid poker player. He is also a black belt in martial arts and a talented classical pianist.

Jimmy was born in Seoul, and grew up playing go and poker. He turned professional in 1974 and was the best player at Dongguk University when he attended. Along with these accolades, he was also the South Korean National Amateur Champion two times in a row.

The Hanguk Kiwon awarded him four dan for spreading go around the world in 1984, after he moved to the United States in 1975. As of 2021, he is 6 dan.

Cha has a nickname, "eternal Mr. Quarter-Finalist", because in many professional tournaments he would usually lose in the quarterfinals. In 1989, he beat Yamashiro Hiroshi and Ohira Shuzo to advance to the quarterfinals of the Fujitsu Cup, only to lose. The next year, he made it to the quarterfinals of the Fujitsu Cup again after beating Cho Chikun. In March 2008, he defeated Imamura Toshiya 9P in the Chunlan Cup.

Today, he splits his time between go, poker, and managing businesses.

Cha has almost $400,000 in career poker earnings.

== Runner-Up titles ==
Title	Years Lost
Defunct	2
(United States) North American Masters Tournament	1995, 1998
