= Ralph Perry (poker player) =

Russian poker player

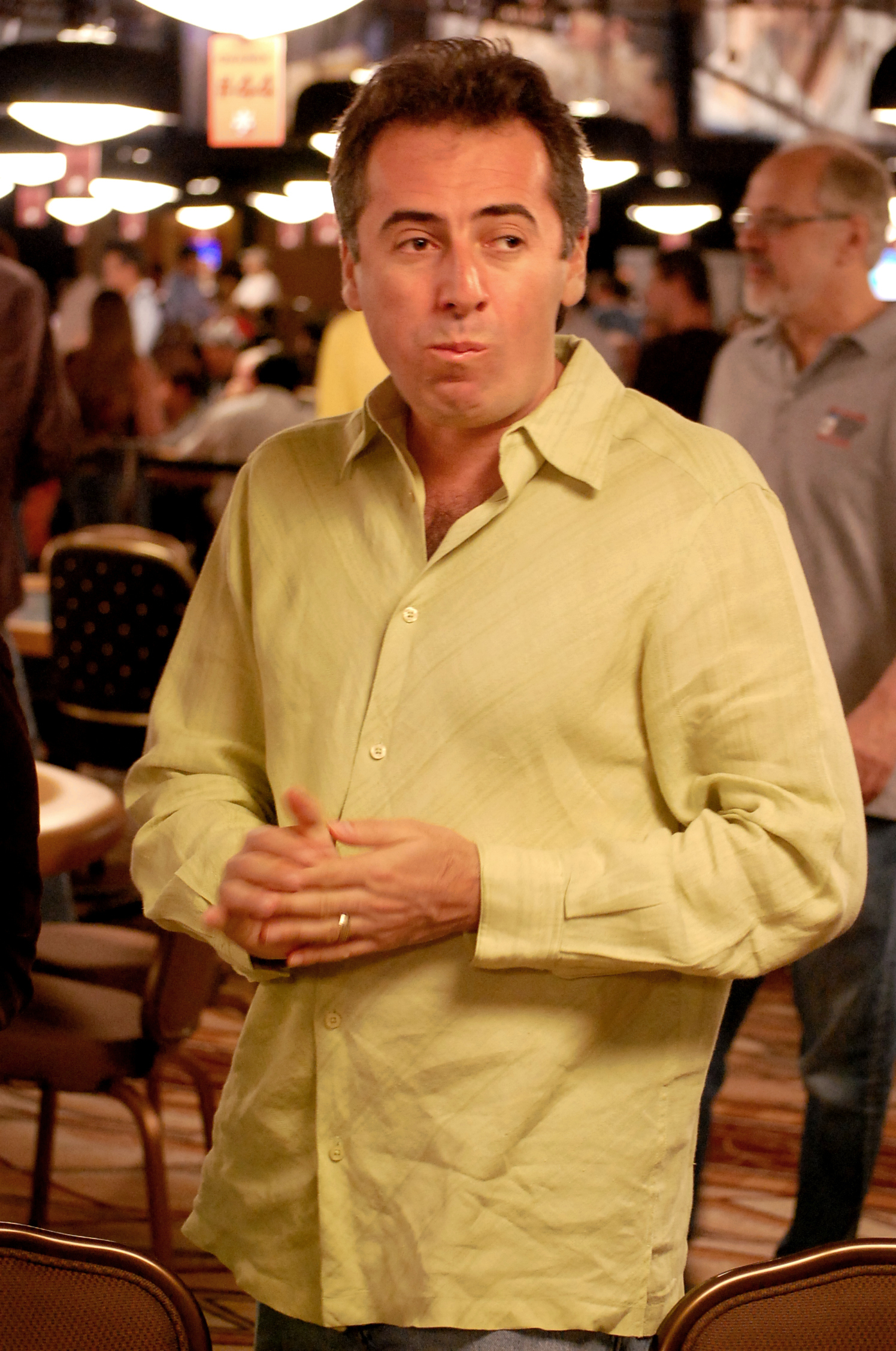
- Perry at the 2008 World Series of Poker
- Nickname: Russian Ralph

World Series of Poker
- Bracelet: 1
- Money finishes: 64
- Highest WSOP Main Event finish: 3rd, 2002

World Poker Tour
- Title: None
- Final table: 1
- Money finishes: 9

Rafael Perivoskin, also known as Ralph Perry, is a professional poker player. He is originally from Russia and has been playing professionally since 1992.

In 2006, Perry represented Russia at the inaugural Intercontinental Poker Championship and reached the semi-finals, during which he was the target of some much-publicised needling by Tony G.

On 18 July 2006, Perry won his first World Series of Poker bracelet, along with over $200,000, in the $1,500 pot limit Omaha event.

In 2006, Perry was placed 17th in Card Player's Player of the Year awards.

Perry finished third in the 2002 WSOP Main Event.

As of 2026, Perry's live tournament earnings exceeded $3,875,000. His 64 cashes at the WSOP account for $2,250,467 of those winnings.
