= 2003 World Series of Poker =

Series of poker tournaments

- Location: Binion's Horseshoe, Las Vegas, Nevada
- Dates: April 15 – May 23
- Competitors: 839
- Total prize money: $7,802,700

Champion
- (United States) Chris Moneymaker

The 2003 World Series of Poker (WSOP) was a poker tournament held at Binion's Horseshoe. The tournament is seen as a turning point in the history of competitive poker, as amateur Chris Moneymaker's victory in the main event despite no prior tournament experience was widely regarded as bringing with it a surge in public interest and popularity in the game, known as the Moneymaker effect, or the Poker boom. Moneymaker entered the tournament from a ticket won in an online PokerStars table.

== Events ==
There were 35 preliminary bracelet events at the 2003 World Series of Poker. Doyle Brunson, Johnny Chan, and Phil Hellmuth all tied Johnny Moss's career bracelet record with their ninth. Men Nguyen finished runner-up in two events in this World Series.

#	Date	Event	Entries	Winner	Prize	Runner-up	Results
1	April 15, 2003	$500 Casino Employees Limit Hold'em	208	David Lukaszewski (1/1)	$35,800	Paul Trieglaff	Results
2	April 16, 2003	$2,000 Limit Hold'em	422	Mohammed Ibrahim (1/1)	$290,420	Jon Brody	Results
3	April 17, 2003	$1,500 Seven-card stud	177	Toto Leonidas (1/1)	$98,760	Rallis Peter Tanagiotias	Results
4	April 18, 2003	$2,000 Omaha Hi-Lo Split	175	Chris Ferguson (1/4)	$123,680	Barry Bindelglass	Results
5	April 19, 2003	$2,000 No Limit Hold'em	407	Jim Meehan (1/1)	$280,100	Guy Calvert	Results
6	April 20, 2003	$1,500 Pot Limit Hold'em	212	Prahlad Friedman (1/1)	$109,400	Bernd Rygol	Results
7	April 21, 2003	$1,500 Seven Card Stud Hi-Lo Split	190	Minh Nguyen (1/1)	$106,020	Bob Mangino	Results
8	April 22, 2003	$1,500 Pot Limit Omaha	117	Erik Seidel (1/6)	$146,100	Men Nguyen (0/4)	Results
9	April 23, 2003	$2,000 H.O.R.S.E.	113	Doyle Brunson (1/9)	$84,080	Brian Haveson	Results
10	April 24, 2003	$2,000 1/2 Hold'em, 1/2 Seven Card Stud	89	Chris Ferguson (2/5)	$66,220	Diego Cordovez (0/1)	Results
11	April 25, 2003	$2,500 No Limit Hold'em	259	Phi Nguyen (1/1)	$222,800	Jim Miller	Results
12	April 26, 2003	$2,500 Limit Hold'em	194	Phil Hellmuth (1/8)	$171,400	Young Phan	Results
13	April 27, 2003	$2,500 Seven Card Stud	103	Michael Saltzburg (1/1)	$95,580	Mimi Tran	Results
14	April 28, 2003	$5,000 No Limit Deuce to Seven Draw	28	O'Neil Longson (1/2)	$147,680	Allen Cunningham (0/2)	Results
15	April 29, 2003	$5,000 No Limit Hold'em	127	Johnny Chan (1/8)	$224,400	Surinder Sunar	Results
16	April 30, 2003	$1,500 Limit Omaha	120	Eddy Scharf (1/2)	$63,600	Dave Colclough	Results
17	May 1, 2003	$1,500 Limit Hold'em	346	John Arrage (1/1)	$178,600	Kathy Liebert	Results
18	May 2, 2003	$2,500 Omaha Hi-Lo Split	135	Layne Flack (1/4)	$119,260	Men Nguyen (0/4)	Results
19	May 3, 2003	$2,000 Pot Limit Hold'em	214	Mickey Appleman (1/4)	$147,280	Brian Plona	Results
20	May 4, 2003	$1,000 Seniors' No Limit Hold'em	378	Ron Rose (1/1)	$130,060	Ron McMillan	Results
21	May 5, 2003	$2,500 Seven Card Stud Hi-Lo Split	140	John Juanda (1/2)	$130,200	Shawn Sheikhan	Results
22	May 6, 2003	$1,500 No Limit Hold'em	531	Amir Vahedi (1/1)	$270,000	Cleve Haley	Results
23	May 7, 2003	$2,000 S.H.O.E.	135	Daniel Negreanu (1/2)	$100,440	Jim Pechac	Results
24	May 8, 2003	$5,000 Pot Limit Omaha	85	Johnny Chan (2/9)	$158,100	Emmanuel Sebag	Results
25	May 9, 2003	$1,500 Limit Hold'em Shootout	220	Layne Flack (2/5)	$120,000	Annie Duke	Results
26	May 10, 2003	$3,000 Limit Hold'em	154	Tom Jacobs (1/1)	$163,000	Jan Sjavik	Results
27	May 11, 2003	$5,000 Seven-Card Razz	30	Huck Seed (1/4)	$71,500	Phil Ivey (0/4)	Results
28	May 11, 2003	$1,000 Ladies' 1/2 Hold'em, 1/2 Stud	112	Barb Rugolo (1/1)	$40,700	J. J. Liu	Results
29	May 12, 2003	$1,500 Omaha Hi-Lo Split	259	Frankie O'Dell (1/1)	$133,760	Bill Schonsheck	Results
30	May 13, 2003	$3,000 Pot Limit Hold'em	218	Charles Keith Lehr (1/1)	$225,040	Chris Ferguson (0/5)	Results
31	May 14, 2003	$5,000 Seven Card Stud	96	Men Nguyen (1/5)	$178,560	Mel Judah (0/2)	Results
32	May 15, 2003	$3,000 No Limit Hold'em	398	Phil Hellmuth (2/9)	$410,860	Daniel Negreanu (0/2)	Results
33	May 16, 2003	$2,500 Pot Limit Omaha	120	John Juanda (2/3)	$203,840	O'Neil Longson (0/2)	Results
34	May 17, 2003	$5,000 Limit Hold'em	143	Carlos Mortensen (1/2)	$251,680	Mark Gregorich	Results
35	May 18, 2003	$1,500 Ace to Five Triple Draw Lowball	78	Men Nguyen (2/6)	$43,520	Charles Keith Lehr (0/1)	Results
36	May 19, 2003	$10,000 No Limit Hold'em Main Event	839	Chris Moneymaker (1/1)	$2,500,000	Sam Farha (0/1)	Results

== Main Event ==
There were 839 entrants to the main event. Each paid $10,000 to enter, with the top 63 players finishing in the money. It was the largest poker tournament ever played in a brick and mortar casino at the time. Many entrants, including the overall winner Chris Moneymaker, won their seat in online poker tournaments. Moneymaker defeated professional Sam Farha heads-up with two pair, which improved to a full house on the river, over Farha's pair of jacks. The 2003 Main Event was the first tournament to pay out at least $2,500,000 to the winner. Dan Harrington made the final table and looked to win his second Main Event championship, but fell short in third place.

=== Final table ===
Name	Number of chips (percentage of total)	WSOP Bracelets*	WSOP Cashes*	WSOP Earnings*
(United States) Chris Moneymaker	2,344,000 (27.9%)	0	0	0
(Iran) Amir Vahedi	1,407,000 (16.8%)	1	4	$314,950
(United States) Sam Farha	999,000 (11.9%)	1	2	$193,140
(United States) Tomer Benvenisti	922,000 (11.0%)	0	0	0
(United States) David Singer	750,000 (8.9%)	0	8	$93,115
(United States) Jason Lester	695,000 (8.3%)	0	11	$128,200
(United States) Dan Harrington	574,000 (6.8%)	2	7	$1,325,858
(United States) Young Pak	360,000 (4.3%)	0	4	$33,819
(United States) David Grey	338,000 (4.0%)	1	7	$306,664

*Career statistics prior to the beginning of the 2003 Main Event.

=== Final table results ===
Place	Name	Prize
1st	Chris Moneymaker	$2,500,000
2nd	Sam Farha	$1,300,000
3rd	Dan Harrington	$650,000
4th	Jason Lester	$440,000
5th	Tomer Benvenisti	$320,000
6th	Amir Vahedi	$250,000
7th	Young Pak	$200,000
8th	David Grey	$160,000
9th	David Singer	$120,000

=== In The Money Finishes ===
NB: This list is restricted to In The Money finishers with an existing Wikipedia entry.

Place	Name	Prize
10th	Phil Ivey	$82,700
11th	Minh Nguyen	$80,000
12th	Dutch Boyd	$80,000
13th	Freddy Deeb	$65,000
14th	Marcel Lüske	$65,000
15th	Bruno Fitoussi	$65,000
18th	Scotty Nguyen	$55,000
19th	Howard Lederer	$45,000
23rd	Dennis Waterman	$45,000
25th	Men Nguyen	$45,000
27th	Phil Hellmuth	$45,000
29th	Victor Ramdin	$35,000
31st	Jeff Shulman	$35,000
34th	Ken Lennaárd	$35,000
41st	Humberto Brenes	$25,000
42nd	Kevin Song	$25,000
45th	Paul Darden	$25,000
47th	Annie Duke	$20,000
49th	Barry Greenstein	$20,000
54th	Julian Gardner	$20,000
55th	David Chiu	$15,000
56th	Julien Studley	$15,000

== See also ==
- Poker boom
