= Diego Cordovez =

American poker player (born 1965)

- Born: 1965 (age 60–61); New York City, New York, U.S.

World Series of Poker
- Bracelet: 1
- Final tables: 7
- Money finishes: 16
- Highest WSOP Main Event finish: 67th, 2007

Diego Cordovez (born 1965) is an American poker player, the only son of the former UN Under-Secretary-General, Diego Cordovez. He has won one World Series of Poker bracelet, and he has 16 WSOP cash finishes, including 7 final tables. He has won over $1.4 million in career tournament winnings. His 16 cashes at the WSOP account for $613,847 of those winnings.

Born in New York City, Cordovez claims to have been introduced to poker by his first-grade teacher, as a way of making basic math seem like fun.

At the 2000 World Series of Poker, Cordovez won the $2,000 no limit Texas hold 'em event, earning more than $290,000 and a bracelet. He defeated English professional poker player and bracelet winner, Dave Ulliott heads-up to win the tournament. The final table also included Phil Ivey, David Pham, and Toto Leonidas. Cordovez followed this a couple of months later with another first-place finish at the Legends of Poker limit hold 'em event.

In 2002, Cordovez cashed in another four WSOP events, making the final table in three of them, including a second place in the $2,000 SHOE event, losing to Phil Ivey. He also won the limit Holdem championship at the Los Angeles Poker Open at the Commerce Casino, the largest limit Holdem tournament in history; the first prize was $569,430.

Cordovez was featured on ESPN's coverage of the 2008 WSOP Main Event at a table which also featured 2003 Main Event Champion Chris Moneymaker and professional player Clonie Gowen as well as being interviewed in a segment about his career as a poker player.

Cordovez is currently one of the hosts of the Spanish-language version of Poker After Dark, broadcast throughout Latin America on Discovery Channel (Latin America).

Before his poker career, Cordovez was co-founder and COO of Aveo Inc., a Silicon Valley online tech support software provider.

Cordovez holds bachelor's and master's degrees from Stanford University.
