= Anthony Nguyen =

American poker player

- Nickname: Andy

World Series of Poker
- Bracelet: 1
- Money finish: 1
- Highest WSOP Main Event finish: None

Anthony Nguyen, a.k.a. Andy, a poker dealer at Binion's Horseshoe Casino, was the World Series of Poker bracelet winner in the Casino Employees Championship for $83,390 in 2005. Andy had worked at the Binion's as a poker dealer since 2001. He was 43 when he won the tournament. At the time of the event, the 662 participants represented the largest field at the Casino Employee Championship event.

As of 2017, Nguyen's lifetime winnings exceed $240,000.

== World Series of Poker bracelets ==
| Year | Tournament | Prize (US$) |
|---|---|---|
| 2005 | $500 Casino Employees No Limit Hold'em | $83,390 |
