= Carl Nessel =

American poker player (born 1947)

- Nickname: Coach
- Born: 1947 (age 78–79)

World Series of Poker
- Bracelet: 1
- Money finish: 1
- Highest WSOP Main Event finish: None

Carl Nessel (born 1947), nicknamed Coach, is an American poker player.

In 2004, he was a retired fire fighter and part-time poker tournament employee who won a bracelet in the Casino Employees Championship event at the World Series of Poker.

Prior to the 2004 WSOP, Nessel was a regular poker player around Thousand Oaks, California and worked part-time at various poker tournaments around the city.

At the 2004 WSOP, Nessel was employed as a "Chip Runner." "To get to any final table, let alone the World Series, is an accomplishment that goes beyond anything else in poker," the Coach said. "I saw light at the end of the tunnel when I got (heads-up against Pockat), but the light turned out to be a train."

As of 2004, Nessel's lifetime winnings exceed $83,000.

== World Series of Poker bracelets ==
Year	Tournament	Prize (US$)
2004	$500 Casino Employees No Limit Hold'em	$40,000
