= John Shipley (poker player) =

English poker player

- Nickname: None

World Series of Poker
- Bracelet: None
- Money finishes: 12
- Highest WSOP Main Event finish: 7th, 2002

European Poker Tour
- Title: 1
- Final table: 1
- Money finishes: 2

John Shipley is an English professional poker player from Solihull, West Midlands.

Amongst his money finishes at the World Series of Poker (WSOP) are a 7th-place finish in the 2002 $10,000 no limit hold'em main event, where he earned $125,000. He had also finished in the money of the same event at the 2000 WSOP.

Following this, John was invited onto the Late Night Poker television series in its sixth season, but was unable to progress through his heat which featured Ken Lennaárd, Victoria Coren, Tony Bloom, Gary Jones, Dave Ulliott, and Ross Boatman.

In October 2004, Shipley won first place in the European Poker Tour (EPT) London event, taking home £200,000 ($359,479) in winnings.

As of 2008, his total live tournament winnings exceed $820,000.

Shipley plays online poker at PokerStars under the alias "Sapphire1".
