= Melissa Hayden (poker player) =

American poker player

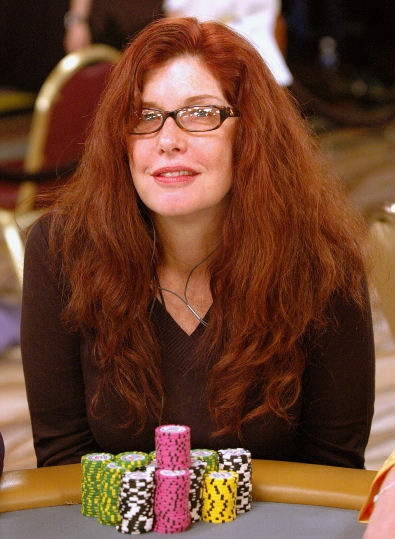
- Melissa Hayden at the 2006 World Series of Poker.

World Series of Poker
- Bracelet: None
- Money finishes: 11
- Highest WSOP Main Event finish: 476th, 2006

World Poker Tour
- Title: None
- Final table: 1
- Money finishes: 4

Melissa Hayden is a professional poker player.

As of 2023, Hayden's live tournament winnings exceed $890,000. Her biggest return to date was at the 2000 World Series of Poker limit Texas hold 'em event, where she finished in second place, winning $142,000. She placed fifth in the WPT Ladies' Night V Tournament at the Bicycle Casino in Bell Gardens, California, on September 1, 2007. Hayden once beat world champion Stu Ungar in a $5,000 heads-up match in what is believed to have been his final poker game before dying days later.
