= Hasan Habib =

Pakistani American poker player (born 1962)

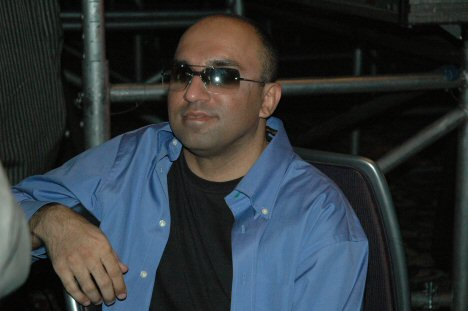
- Habib at the 2005 World Poker Tour Five Star Poker Classic
- Born: 19 April 1962 (age 64); Karachi, Pakistan

World Series of Poker
- Bracelet: 1
- Money finishes: 25
- Highest WSOP Main Event finish: 4th, 2000

World Poker Tour
- Title: None
- Final tables: 3
- Money finishes: 8

Hasan Habib (born 19 April 1962 in Karachi, Pakistan) is a Pakistani American professional poker player.

During his early years in Pakistan, Habib was the Pakistan 14-and-under National Tennis Champion. Habib went to America at the age of 18 to study business at the University of Redlands. He also once owned a nationwide chain of video stores. He began playing casino poker in 1985, and had his first major poker tournament cash in the Jim Brady Month at the Bell Gardens in Los Angeles in 1993.

In 2004, he finished second to Martin de Knijff in the World Poker Tour (WPT) $25,000 Championship, receiving a $1,372,223 prize. Later in the year he finished on the television bubble at the WPT $15,000 Five-Diamond World Poker Classic, gaining a further $108,906. He eventually won a World Series of Poker bracelet for the $1,500 Seven Card Stud Hi-Lo Split event ($93,060) in 2004.

The following year he made the final table of the $25,000 WPT Championship again. He finished in third place ($896,375), but also had a stake on eventual winner Tuan Le. Observers have commented that this may have affected the interaction between them on the final table, however Habib has made it clear he was still playing to win, citing that the endorsements would have made it more financially viable.

As of 2015, he has cashed twenty-five times in the World Series of Poker (WSOP), including a 2nd-place finish in $2,500 Omaha Hi-Lo Split event in 2000, and a 4th-place finish in the $10,000 no limit Texas hold 'em Main Event in the same year, for which he took home $326,000. In September 2005, he won the opening No Limit Hold'em event of PokerStars' fourth annual World Championship of Online Poker, taking home $306,000.

As of 2015, his total live tournament winnings to date exceed $5,500,000. His 25 cashes at the WSOP account for over $1,500,000 of those winnings.

Habib currently resides in Downey, California.
