= Greg Raymer =

American poker player (born 1964)

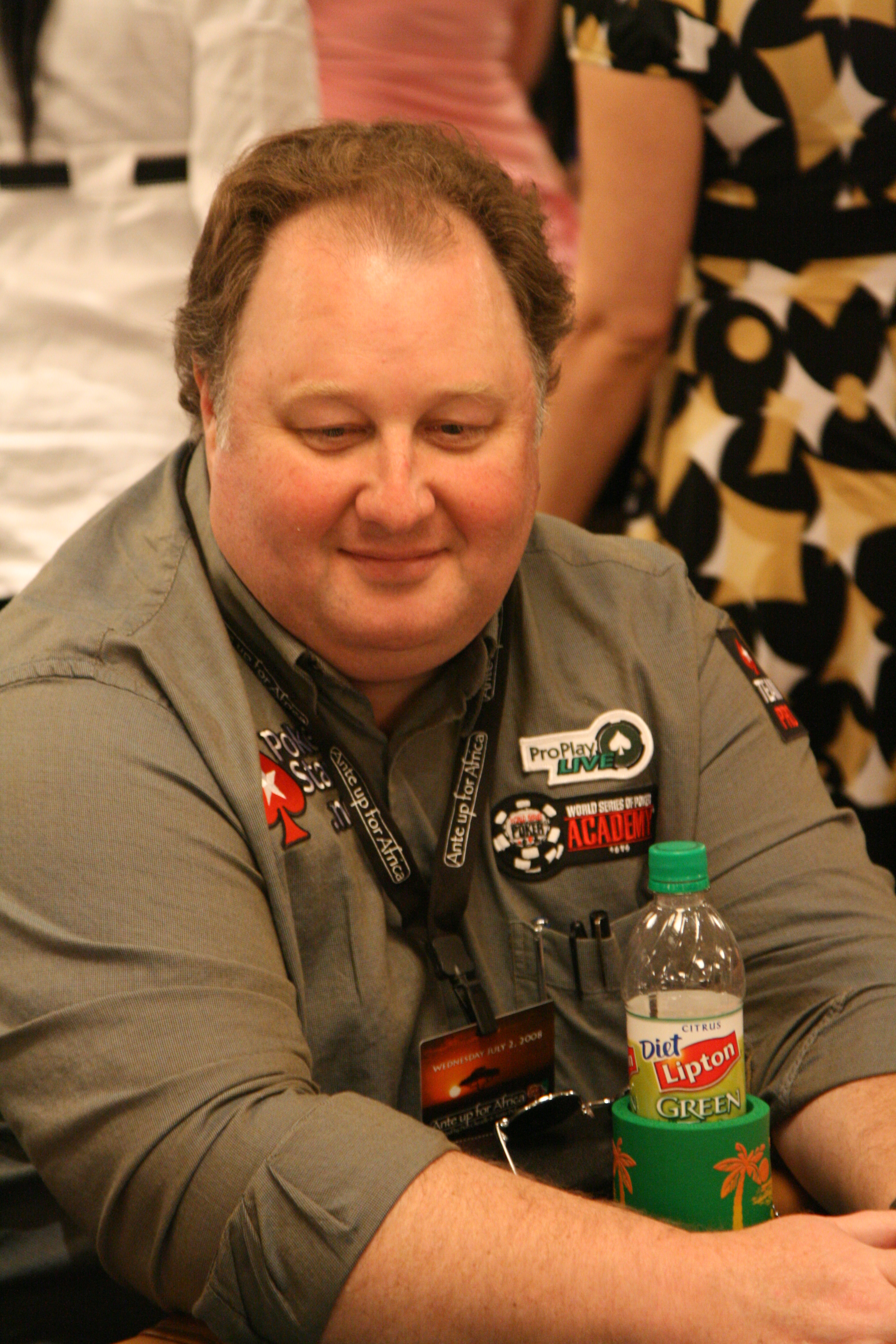
- Raymer at the 2008 World Series of Poker
- Nickname: Fossilman
- Born: June 25, 1964 (age 62); Minot, North Dakota, U.S.

World Series of Poker
- Bracelet: 1
- Money finishes: 61
- Highest WSOP Main Event finish: Winner, 2004

World Poker Tour
- Title: None
- Final table: None
- Money finishes: 2

Gregory Paul Raymer (born June 25, 1964), nicknamed "Fossilman," is a professional poker player and author. He is best known for winning the 2004 World Series of Poker Main Event.

== Early life ==
Raymer's family moved numerous times during his childhood, from his birthplace of Minot, North Dakota to Lansing, Michigan, where he lived until age 10. He then moved to Clearwater, Florida, attending Dunedin Middle School, and would move later once again, this time to St. Louis, Missouri.

After Raymer graduated from Parkway South High School in St. Louis, he enrolled at the University of Missouri–Rolla, where he majored in chemistry and became a member of Kappa Sigma fraternity. He graduated from the University of Minnesota with a master's degree in biochemistry in 1989, and then again from the University of Minnesota Law School in 1992. He then practiced law as a patent attorney for more than a decade, spending the last six years of his legal career at the pharmaceutical company Pfizer.

Raymer is nicknamed "Fossilman" because of his fossil collecting hobby. He uses a small fossil as a card protector while he plays poker.

== Poker ==
Raymer first finished in the money of a World Series of Poker (WSOP) event during 2001 in the $1,500 Omaha hi-lo split 8 or better event won by Chris Ferguson. At the 2004 World Series of Poker, he defeated David Williams to win the $5,000,000 first prize in the $10,000 no limit Texas hold 'em WSOP main event.

The following year, as defending champion, Raymer finished 25th (out of 5,619 entrants) in the 2005 WSOP Main Event, earning him $304,680. Arguably, this two-year accomplishment ranks as one of the most impressive performances in the Main Event in recent history, along with Dan Harrington's. Both players posted deep runs in consecutive years (Harrington finished 3rd and 4th in 2003/2004), and both looked to repeat as world champion within a ten-year span (Harrington won the Main Event in 1995).

In 2005, Raymer entered the inaugural British Poker Open, which was filmed in London and was the UK's biggest live poker event in history. As one of the favorites, he made the final table and came in third in a live final, worth around £20,000.

On September 17, 2007, Raymer won his first World Championship of Online Poker (WCOOP) bracelet by winning Event #6 of the 2007 WCOOP, a $320 Pot Limit Omaha with Rebuys event. The victory netted him $168,362.

At the 2009 World Series of Poker $40,000 No Limit hold 'em event, he placed third out of 201 entrants and won $774,927.

In 2012, he won an unprecedented four Heartland Poker Tour events. On July 30, he bested 130 opponents at the Route 66 Casino in Albuquerque, New Mexico, on October 1, he defeated 335 players at the River City Casino in St. Louis, on October 22, he took down another title at the Prairie Meadows Racetrack Casino In Iowa, and on November 19 he capped it off with a win at the HPT Champ Open at the Belterra Casino in Indiana. Raymer easily won the Heartland Poker Tour Player of The Year title earning a total of $371,967 in winnings.

In 2014, he first started inviting investors to stake his poker playing. In 2016 he partnered with the staking website YouStake to sell all of his action for the year to the public.

At the 2016 World Series of Poker Main Event, he made another deep run finishing 122nd in a field of 6,737 players earning $49,108.

In 2020, he won a record fifth Heartland Poker Tour Main Event. On January 20, he bested 520 opponents at the Ameristar Casino East Chicago in East Chicago, Indiana earning him $171,411 on a $1,650 buy-in.

In October 2021, Raymer won a Platinum Pass to the PokerStars Players' Championship worth $30,000 (plus top prize of $4,911) in the $200 HORSE tournament at the inaugural Cardplayer Lifestyle Mixed Game Festival, hosted by Robbie Strazynski.

As of June 2026, his total live tournament winnings exceed $8.3 million. Most of his winnings ($6,762,645) have come from his 60+ cashes at WSOP tournament events.

World Series of Poker bracelets
Year	Tournament	Prize (US$)
2004	$10,000 No Limit Texas Hold'em World Championship	$5,000,000

== Other activities ==
On December 20, 2004, two men attempted to rob Raymer at gunpoint as he returned to his Bellagio hotel room after playing in a cash game. Raymer held them off by using a karate chop until police arrived and was unharmed.

Raymer has lobbied extensively to have poker regulated and classified as a game of skill, after the passage of the UIGEA in 2006. As part of this effort, he was a member of the Board of Directors of the now defunct Poker Players Alliance.

In a December 2006 interview, Raymer said that he was considering running for Vice President of the United States in 2008 as a candidate of the Libertarian Party. However, Raymer did not end up running.

Since 2011, Raymer has operated a poker training school called Fossilman Poker Training. The 1-2 day training classes are conducted at poker rooms around the US and Canada. Raymer was one of the original members of Team PokerStars Pro, a group of professional poker players who represent and endorse PokerStars.com, the world's largest online poker site. As of early 2011, he is no longer a member of Team PokerStars.

In March 2013 Raymer was arrested for soliciting a prostitute in North Carolina. The charges were dropped after he completed 75 hours of community service.

In June 2019, his book Fossilman's Winning Tournament Strategies was published by D+B Poker
