= Kamikaze (cocktail) =

Cocktail of vodka, triple sec and lime juice

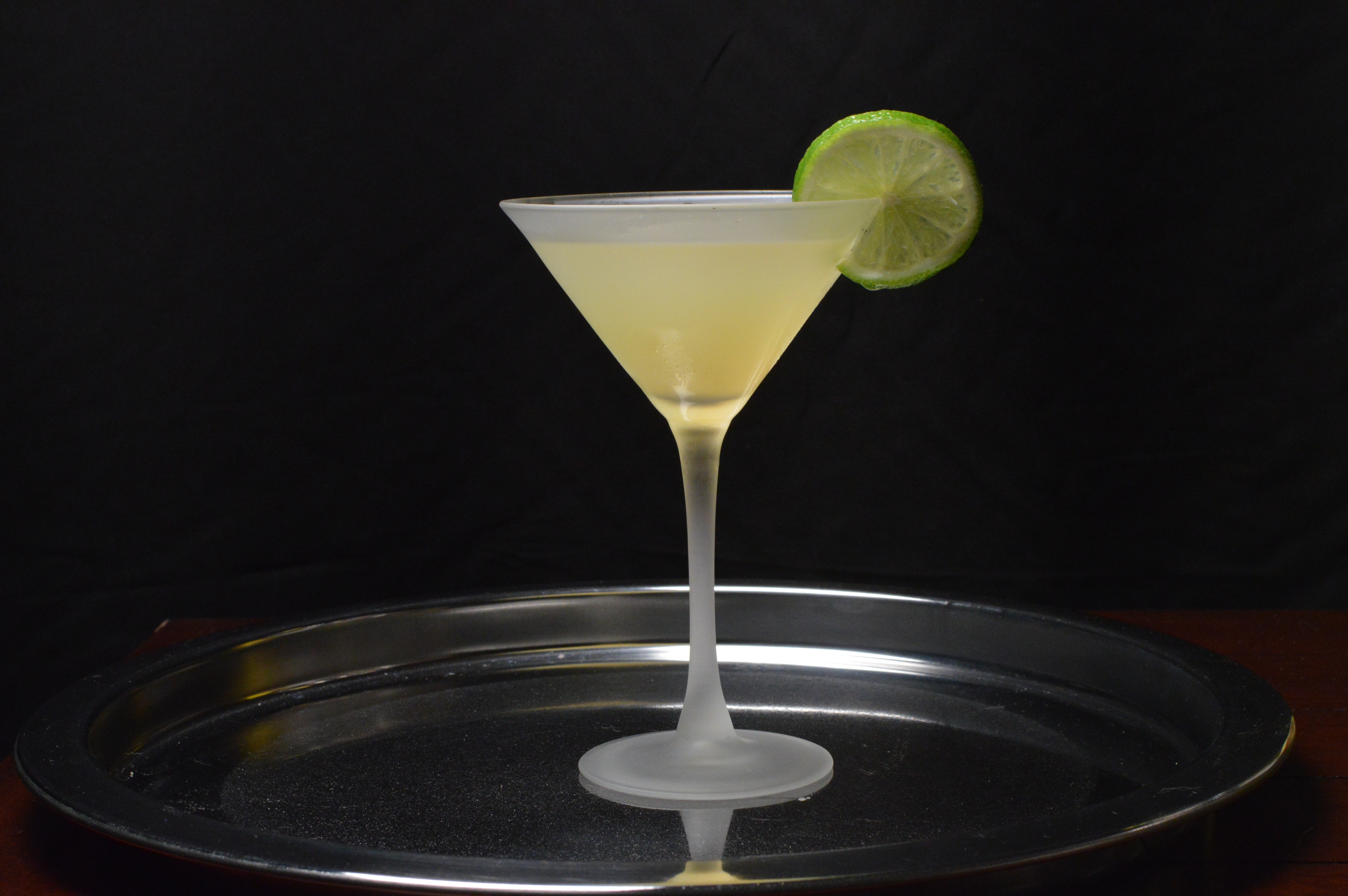
- Kamikaze cocktail, served straight up in a cocktail glass
- Type: Cocktail
- Ingredients: 3 cl vodka; 3 cl triple sec; 3 cl lime juice
- Base spirit: Vodka
- Standard drinkware: Cocktail glass
- Standard garnish: Lime slice
- Served: Straight up: chilled, without ice
- Preparation: Shake all ingredients together with ice. Strain into glass, garnish and serve.

The Kamikaze is a cocktail made of equal parts vodka, triple sec and lime juice. Garnish is typically a wedge or twist of lime. Dozens of variations exist in online databases today. Some include the addition of cane sugar.

The drink is probably named for the Japanese "Kamikaze" dive bombers of World War II.

== See also ==
- Gimlet (cocktail)
