= 2000 World Series of Poker =

Series of poker tournaments

- Location: Binion's Horseshoe, Las Vegas, Nevada
- Dates: April 22 – May 23

Champion
- (United States) Chris Ferguson

The 2000 World Series of Poker (WSOP) was held at Binion's Horseshoe.

== Events ==
There were 23 preliminary bracelet events at the 2000 World Series of Poker. Future Poker Hall of Famer Phil Ivey won his first career bracelet in Event #14.

#	Date	Event	Entries	Winner	Prize	Runner-up	Results
1	April 22, 2000	$500 Casino Employees Limit Hold'em	109	Dave Alizadeth (1/1)	$21,800	Von Huang	Results
2	April 25, 2000	$2,000 Limit Hold'em	496	Tony Ma (1/2)	$367,040	Roman Abinsay	Results
3	April 26, 2000	$1,500 Seven-card stud	245	Jerri Thomas (1/1)	$135,825	Bill Gibbs	Results
4	April 27, 2000	$1,500 Limit Omaha	143	Ivo Donev (1/1)	$85,800	Thor Hansen (0/1)	Results
5	April 28, 2000	$1,500 Seven Card Stud Hi-Lo Split 8 or better	218	Randy Holland (1/2)	$120,990	Eli Balas (0/2)	Results
6	April 29, 2000	$1,500 Pot Limit Omaha w/Rebuys	156	Johnny Chan (1/6)	$179,400	Josh Arieh (0/1)	Results
7	April 30, 2000	$1,500 Omaha Hi-Lo Split 8 or better	290	Nat Koe (1/1)	$160,950	Brent Carter (0/2)	Results
8	May 1, 2000	$2,000 No Limit Hold'em	396	Diego Cordovez (1/1)	$293,040	Dave Ulliott (0/1)	Results
9	May 2, 2000	$2,500 Seven Card Stud	151	Chris Ferguson (1/1)	$151,000	Al Decarlo	Results
10	May 3, 2000	$2,000 Pot Limit Hold'em	235	Jimmy Athanas (1/1)	$173,900	Dave Colclough	Results
11	May 4, 2000	$3,000 Limit Hold'em	178	Chris Tsiprailidis (1/1)	$213,600	Ed Smith	Results
12	May 4, 2000	$5,000 No Limit Deuce to Seven Draw w/Rebuys	30	Jennifer Harman (1/1)	$146,250	Lyle Berman (0/3)	Results
13	May 5, 2000	$2,500 Seven Card Stud Hi-Lo Split 8 or better	129	Joe Wynn (1/1)	$129,000	Andreas Krause	Results
14	May 6, 2000	$2,500 Pot Limit Omaha w/Rebuys	100	Phil Ivey (1/1)	$195,000	Amarillo Slim (0/4)	Results
15	May 7, 2000	$1,500 Ace to Five Draw Lowball	127	Richard Dunberg (1/1)	$76,200	Roger Van Driesen	Results
16	May 8, 2000	$2,500 Omaha Hi-Lo Split 8 or better	160	Michael Sohayegh (1/1)	$160,000	Hasan Habib	Results
17	May 9, 2000	$1,500 Razz	129	Huck Seed (1/3)	$77,400	John Spadavecchia (0/1)	Results
18	May 10, 2000	$3,000 Pot Limit Hold'em	200	Mike Carson (1/1)	$222,000	Jack Ward	Results
19	May 11, 2000	$5,000 Seven Card Stud	101	David Chiu (1/3)	$202,000	Ken Flaton (0/1)	Results
20	May 12, 2000	$3,000 No Limit Hold'em	301	Chris Bjorin (1/2)	$334,110	Paul Evans	Results
21	May 13, 2000	$5,000 Omaha Hi-Lo Split 8 or better	99	Howard Lederer (1/1)	$198,000	Allen Cunningham	Results
22	May 14, 2000	$5,000 Limit Hold'em	142	Jay Heimowitz (1/5)	$284,000	Melissa Hayden	Results
23	May 14, 2000	$1,000 Ladies' Limit Hold'em/Seven Card Stud	133	Nani Dollison (1/1)	$53,200	Martine Oules	Results
24	May 18, 2000	$10,000 No Limit Hold'em Main Event	512	Chris Ferguson (2/2)	$1,500,000	T. J. Cloutier (0/4)	Results

== Main Event ==
There were 512 entrants to the main event. Each paid $10,000 to enter the tournament, with the top 45 players finishing in the money. The 2000 Main Event was the first time the total entries of the Main Event surpassed 500 players.

Ferguson had a 10 to 1 chip lead when starting his heads-up against Cloutier. After a back-and-forth battle, Ferguson decided to call Cloutier's AQ all-in with his own A9. When a 9 appeared on the river, Ferguson had beaten the tournament favourite.

After his runner-up finish, Cloutier remarked that he gave it a good effort and acknowledged his opponent's strong play, noting the significance of his $896,500 payday. With this result, Cloutier became the all-time money leader on the WSOP leaderboard.

=== Final table ===
Name	Number of chips (percentage of total)	WSOP Bracelets*	WSOP Cashes*	WSOP Earnings*
(United States) Chris Ferguson	2,853,000 (55.7%)	1	15	$328,476
(United States) James McManus	554,000 (10.8%)	0	0	0
(United States) Roman Abinsay	521,000 (10.2%)	0	1	$188,480
(United States) Steve Kaufman	511,000 (10.0%)	0	0	0
(United States) Hasan Habib	464,000 (9.1%)	0	3	$95,245
(United States) T. J. Cloutier	216,000 (4.2%)	4	32	$1,748,616

*Career statistics prior to the beginning of the 2000 Main Event.

=== Final table results ===
Place	Name	Prize
1st	Chris Ferguson	$1,500,000
2nd	T. J. Cloutier	$896,500
3rd	Steve Kaufman	$570,500
4th	Hasan Habib	$326,000
5th	James McManus	$247,760
6th	Roman Abinsay	$195,600

=== In The Money Finishes ===
NB: This list is restricted to In The Money finishers with an existing Wikipedia entry.

Place	Name	Prize
7th	Jeff Shulman	$146,700
8th	Tom Franklin	$97,800
9th	Mickey Appleman	$74,980
10th	Annie Duke	$52,160
12th	Mike Sexton	$52,160
16th	Barny Boatman	$39,120
17th	Kathy Liebert	$39,120
25th	Humberto Brenes	$32,600
31st	Barry Greenstein	$25,000
32nd	Alan Boston	$25,000
38th	Mel Judah	$15,000
42nd	John Shipley	$15,000
