= Randy Holland =

Canadian poker player (born 1951)

- Nickname: None
- Born: 1951 (age 74–75); Calgary, Alberta, Canada

World Series of Poker
- Bracelets: 2
- Money finishes: 36
- Highest WSOP Main Event finish: 12th, 1999

World Poker Tour
- Final table: 1
- Money finishes: 3

Randy Holland (born 1951 in Calgary, Alberta) is a Canadian poker player.

Holland has won two World Series of Poker events: razz in 1996 and seven card stud high low in 2000. In addition to his success at the WSOP, he was won other events, including at the Bicycle Casino, Commerce Casino, and Foxwoods casino.

As of 2024, his total live tournament cashes exceed $3,700,000. His 50 cashes as the WSOP account for $639,346 of those winnings.

== World Series of Poker bracelets ==
Year	Tournament	Prize (US$)
1996	$1,500 Razz	$87,000
2000	$1,500 7 Card Stud Hi/Lo	$120,990
