= Chris Moneymaker =

American poker player (born 1975)

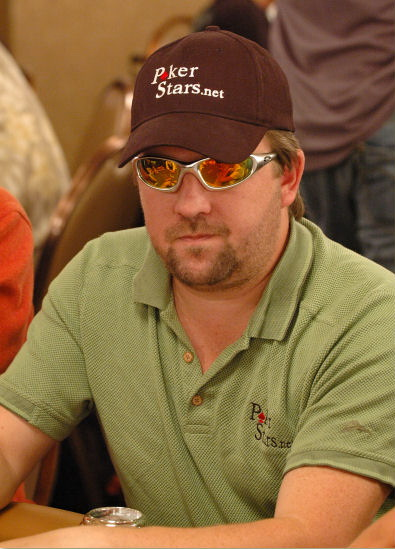
- Moneymaker at the 2006 World Series of Poker
- Born: November 21, 1975 (age 50); Atlanta, Georgia, U.S
- Fairy Tale Level: The Moneymaker Effect; Beyond Fairy Tale
World Series of Poker
- Bracelet: 1
- Money finishes: 9
- Highest WSOP Main Event finish: Winner, 2003
World Poker Tour
- Title: None
- Final table: 1
- Money finishes: 2
European Poker Tour
- Title: None
- Final table: None
- Money finishes: 3

Christopher Bryan Moneymaker (born November 21, 1975) is an American poker player who won the Main Event at the 2003 World Series of Poker (WSOP). His 2003 win is said to have revolutionized poker because he was the first person to become a world champion after qualifying at an online poker site. This has been referred to in the press as the "Moneymaker effect".

== Early life ==
Moneymaker was born in Atlanta, Georgia. He attended Farragut High School in Knoxville, Tennessee, and later earned a master's degree in accounting from the University of Tennessee. After receiving his master's degree, Moneymaker worked as a comptroller. He was also a part-time employee at a local restaurant, in Spring Hill, Tennessee.

Moneymaker said that his ancestors made silver and gold coins and that, upon moving to England, they chose the name "Moneymaker" as a modification of their German last name, "Nurmacher".

== Poker career ==
=== World Series of Poker ===
Moneymaker was working as an accountant when he won a seat in the Main Event of the 2003 World Series of Poker through an $86 satellite tournament at the PokerStars online poker card room. Although largely unknown prior to the tournament, on day one of the tournament his skills caught the attention of professional sports handicapper Lou Diamond, who called Moneymaker his "dark horse to win the whole tournament." Moneymaker went on to win the first prize of $2.5 million, instantly garnering poker superstar status. The 2003 WSOP Main Event was his first live poker tournament, and he made the final table by knocking out Phil Ivey who finished 10th. On the final table, Moneymaker knocked out several players, including Tomer Benvenisti and former Main Event champion Dan Harrington. One of Moneymaker's most memorable hands was heads-up against Sam Farha, when on the river he bluffed "all in" with King high. Farha folded a pair of nines, quickly changing the momentum of the match. Moneymaker eventually won the tournament when his 5♦ 4♠ beat Farha's J♥ 10♦ on a board of J♠ 5♠ 4♣ 8♦ 5♥, giving Moneymaker a full house (5♦ 5♠ 5♥ 4♣ 4♠) to Farha's two pairs (J♥ J♠ 5♠ 5♥ 10♦). After winning the Main Event, he quit his job to serve as a celebrity spokesman for Series owner Harrah's Entertainment as well as PokerStars. He also started his own company, Moneymaker Gaming, and began traveling to play in more numerous and larger buy-in tournaments.

His autobiography, Moneymaker: How an Amateur Poker Player Turned $40 into $2.5 Million at the World Series of Poker was published in March 2005. Eric Raskin, editor of All In Magazine, compiled an oral history of the 2003 WSOP Main Event, which included input from three dozen top poker personalities who were involved, also titled The "Moneymaker Effect". As part of Moneymaker's success, it appears that Moneymaker misremembered the buy-in to the satellite that he won on PokerStars, leading to the error in the title of his autobiography, which refers to winning a $40 satellite, rather than the correct figure of $86.

=== Other poker tournaments ===
On the World Poker Tour, Moneymaker finished second at the 2004 Shooting Stars event and won $200,000.

During Event 5 of the 2008 World Championship of Online Poker, which was a $10,300 buy-in of No Limit Hold'em, Moneymaker finished in sixth place, taking home over $139,000. He also did well in Event 16, the $215 Pot Limit Omaha with Rebuys, where he finished fifth, earning over $28,000.

Moneymaker won the Deep Stack Pot Limit Omaha event of the World Poker Open tournament in July 2009 and won $15,889.

Moneymaker placed 11th in the 2011 PokerStars Caribbean Adventure Main Event, earning $130,000.

In 2011, Moneymaker placed second at the National Heads-Up Poker Championship against Erik Seidel, earning $300,000.

As of June 11, 2025, his total live tournament winnings are $8,294,912, $3,183,521 of which has come from the World Series of Poker.

In 2019, Moneymaker was inducted into the Poker Hall of Fame.

== Personal life ==
Moneymaker has been married twice. He and his first wife divorced in 2004; in an interview for a 10-year retrospective on the 2003 WSOP Main Event, he said "The main reason was me wanting to be a traveling poker pro. She didn't sign up for that life. She was married to a stay-at-home accountant who was not traveling the world, gone all the time, and gambling a lot of money. And it was a choice I had to make. I tried to be good, stay at my job, and be that accountant, but in all honesty I didn't want to." With his first wife, Moneymaker has a daughter. He married again in 2005. As of 2021, they live just outside of Memphis, Tennessee.

== Bibliography ==
- Moneymaker: How an Amateur Poker Player Turned $40 into $2.5 Million at the World Series of Poker (2005) ISBN 0-06-076001-X
- Chris Moneymaker: A True Story, Graphic Novel (2015)
