= 2004 World Series of Poker =

Series of poker tournaments

Coordinates: 36.1716°N 115.1443°W

- Location: Binion's Horseshoe, Las Vegas, Nevada
- Dates: April 21 – May 28

Champion
- (United States) Greg Raymer

The 2004 World Series of Poker (WSOP) was held at Binion's Horseshoe after Harrah's Entertainment purchased the casino and the rights to the tournament in January. Harrah's announced that future WSOP tournaments will be held in a moving circuit of member casinos.

== Events ==
There were 32 preliminary bracelet events at the 2004 World Series of Poker.

#	Date	Event	Entries	Winner	Prize	Runner-up	Results
1	April 21, 2004	$500 Casino Employees Limit Hold'em	279	Carl Nessel (1/1)	$40,000	Cory Pocket	Results
2	April 23, 2004	$2,000 No Limit Hold'em	834	James Vogl (1/1)	$400,000	Shawn Rice	Results
3	April 24, 2004	$1,500 Seven-card stud	258	Ted Forrest (1/4)	$111,440	Chad Brown	Results
4	April 25, 2004	$1,500 Limit Hold-em	608	Aaron Katz (1/1)	$234,940	Richard Gardner-Brown	Results
5	April 26, 2004	$1,500 Omaha Hi-Lo Split	374	Curtis Bibb (1/1)	$160,000	Paul Phillips	Results
6	April 27, 2004	$1,500 Pot Limit Hold'Em	363	Minh Nguyen (1/2)	$155,420	Lorne Persons	Results
7	April 28, 2004	$1,000 No-Limit Hold'Em	538	Gerry Drehobl (1/1)	$365,900	John Juanda (0/3)	Results
8	April 29, 2004	$2,000 Pot Limit Omaha	145	Chau Giang (1/3)	$187,920	Robert Williamson III	Results
9	April 30, 2004	$1,500 No Limit Hold 'Em	831	Scott Fischman (1/1)	$300,000	Joe Awada	Results
10	May 1, 2004	$2,000 Seven Card Stud Hi-Lo Split	224	Cyndy Violette (1/1)	$135,900	Pete Kaufman	Results
11	May 2, 2004	$2,500 Limit Hold'Em	237	Eli Balas (1/3)	$174,440	Steve Shkolnik	Results
12	May 3, 2004	$2,000 H.O.R.S.E.	166	Scott Fischman (2/2)	$100,200	John Cover	Results
13	May 4, 2004	$5,000 No Limit Hold'Em	254	Thomas Keller (1/1)	$382,020	Martin de Knijff	Results
14	May 5, 2004	$1,500 Seven Card Stud Hi-Lo Split	213	Hasan Habib (1/1)	$93,060	Tommy Polk	Results
15	May 6, 2004	$2,000 Limit Hold' Em	287	Daniel Negreanu (1/3)	$169,100	Chris Hinchcliffe	Results
16	May 7, 2004	$5,000 No-Limit Deuce to Seven Draw	46	Barry Greenstein (1/1)	$296,200	Chris Ferguson (0/5)	Results
17	May 7, 2004	$1,500 Limit Hold 'Em Shootout	240	Kathy Liebert (1/1)	$110,180	Kevin Song (0/1)	Results
18	May 8, 2004	$1,500 No-Limit Hold 'Em Shootout	400	Phi Nguyen (1/2)	$180,000	Kirill Gerasimov	Results
19	May 9, 2004	$2,000 Omaha Hi-Lo Split	234	Annie Duke (1/1)	$137,860	Ron Graham (0/1)	Results
20	May 9, 2004	$1,000 Ladies Limit Hold 'Em	201	Hung Doan (1/1)	$58,530	Millie Shiu	Results
21	May 10, 2004	$2,000 Pot Limit Hold 'Em	324	Antonio Esfandiari (1/1)	$58,530	Phi Nguyen (0/2)	Results
22	May 11, 2004	$5,000 Omaha Hi-Lo Split	121	Brett Jungblut (1/1)	$187,720	John Cernuto (0/3)	Results
23	May 12, 2004	$1,500 No Limit Hold'em	834	Ted Forrest (2/5)	$300,300	Susan Pritchett	Results
24	May 13, 2004	$5,000 Seven Card Stud	144	Joe Awada (1/1)	$221,000	Marcel Lüske	Results
25	May 14, 2004	$3,000 Pot Limit Hold'Em	316	Gavin Griffin (1/1)	$270,420	Garry Bush	Results
26	May 15, 2004	$1,500 Seven Card Razz	195	T. J. Cloutier (1/5)	$90,500	Dutch Boyd	Results
27	May 16, 2004	$1,000 Deuce to Seven Triple Draw	82	Farzad Bonyadi (1/2)	$86,980	Trung Ly	Results
28	May 16, 2004	$1,000 Seniors No-Limit Hold'em	519	Gary Gibbs (1/1)	$136,960	Carl McKelvey	Results
29	May 17, 2004	$5,000 Limit Hold 'Em	213	John Hennigan (1/2)	$325,360	An Tran (0/1)	Results
30	May 18, 2004	$3,000 No-Limit Hold'em	651	Mike Sica (1/1)	$503,160	John Kabbaj	Results
31	May 19, 2004	$5,000 Pot Limit Omaha	145	Ted Lawson (1/1)	$500,000	Lee Watkinson	Results
32	May 20, 2004	$1,500 A-5 Draw Lowball	184	Norm Ketchum (1/1)	$84,500	Barry Greenstein (0/1)	Results
33	May 22, 2004	$10,000 No Limit Hold'em Main Event	2,576	Greg Raymer (1/1)	$5,000,000	David Williams	Results

== Main Event ==
There were 2,576 entrants to the Main Event – more than three times the number of the previous year. The rise in popularity among the 2004 Main Event and some preliminary 2004 WSOP events could be attributed to the coverage of Chris Moneymaker's victory from the prior year. Each entry paid $10,000 to enter, with the top 225 players finishing in the money. Many entrants, including the overall winner, won their seat in online poker tournaments. 1995 Main Event champion Dan Harrington made the final table for the second consecutive year. His bid for a second main-event title came up short once again as he finished in fourth place.

=== Final table ===
Name	Number of chips (percentage of total)	WSOP Bracelets*	WSOP Cashes*	WSOP Earnings*
(United States) Greg Raymer	8,215,000 (32.4%)	0	1	$5,345
(United States) Matt Dean	4,920,000 (19.4%)	0	0	0
(United States) Josh Arieh	3,205,000 (12.6%)	1	6	$306,990
(United States) Glenn Hughes	2,275,000 (9.0%)	0	4	$44,270
(United States) Dan Harrington	2,245,000 (8.9%)	2	8	$1,975,858
(United States) David Williams	1,575,000 (6.2%)	0	0	0
(United States) Al Krux	1,305,000 (5.1%)	1	6	$345,705
(United States) Mike McClain	885,000 (3.5%)	0	2	$12,679
(Sweden) Mattias Andersson	740,000 (2.9%)	0	0	0

*Career statistics prior to the beginning of the 2004 Main Event.

=== Final table results ===
Place	Name	Prize
1st	Greg Raymer	$5,000,000
2nd	David Williams	$3,500,000
3rd	Josh Arieh	$2,500,000
4th	Dan Harrington	$1,500,000
5th	Glenn Hughes	$1,100,000
6th	Al Krux	$800,000
7th	Matt Dean	$675,000
8th	Mattias Andersson	$575,000
9th	Michael McClain	$470,400

=== Other high finishes ===
NB: This list is restricted to top 100 finishers with an existing Wikipedia entry.

Place	Name	Prize
10th	Marcel Lüske	$373,000
15th	Eddy Scharf	$275,000
18th	Harry Demetriou	$147,500
26th	Chris Ferguson	$120,000
32nd	Julian Gardner	$80,000
33rd	Matthew Hilger	$80,000
52nd	Gavin Smith	$45,000
53rd	Doyle Brunson	$45,000
54th	Blair Rodman	$45,000
59th	Daniel Alaei	$35,000
72nd	Dave Ulliott	$30,000
86th	Randy Holland	$20,000
87th	Mike Matusow	$20,000
90th	Burt Boutin	$20,000

== See also ==
- World Series of Poker Tournament of Champions
