= World Poker Tour season 10 results =

10th season

Below are the results of season 10 of the World Poker Tour (2011–2012).

== Results ==
=== WPT Spanish Championship ===
- Casino: Casino Barcelona, Barcelona, Spain
- Buy-in: €3200 + €300
- 5-Day Event: May 25–29, 2011
- Number of Entries: 216
- Total Prize Pool: €691,200
- Number of Payouts: 27
- Winning Hand: A♦ 6♦

Final Table
Place	Name	Prize
1st	(Sweden) Lukas Berglund	€260,000
2nd	(France) Romain Matteoli	€118,000
3rd	(France) Frederic Bussot	€64,000
4th	(Spain) Jorge Duffour	€47,000
5th	(Spain) Guillem Usero	€40,000
6th	(Russia) Alexander Sidorin	€33,500
7th	(Germany) Artur Koren	€27,000
8th	(Finland) Markus Ristola	€20,200

=== WPT Slovenia ===
- Casino: Grand Casino Portorož, Portorož
- Buy-in: €3000 + €300
- 5-Day Event: Jul 17–21, 2011
- Number of Entries: 141
- Total Prize Pool: €410,244
- Number of Payouts: 14
- Winning Hand: A♣ J♦

Final Table
Place	Name	Prize
1st	(Slovenia) Miha Travnik	€102,623
2nd	(Italy) Vincenzo Natale	€70,700
3rd	(Sweden) Johannes Korsar	€48,500
4th	(Romania) Ferdi Ciorabai	€36,300
5th	(Italy) Gaetano Fortugno	€28,200
6th	(Italy) Marcello Marigliano	€23,400
7th	(Australia) Hugh Cohen	€19,210
8th	(Finland) Patrik Hirvonen	€16,410

=== Legends of Poker ===
- Casino: The Bicycle Casino, Bell Gardens, California
- Buy-in: $3500 + $200
- 6-Day Event: Aug 25–30, 2011
- Number of Entries: 757
- Total Prize Pool: $2,570,015
- Number of Payouts: 81
- Winning Hand: J♥ 6♣

Final Table
Place	Name	Prize
1st	(United States) Will Failla	$758,085
2nd	(United States) Ken Aldridge	$365,800
3rd	(Canada) Jeff Vertes	$186,400
4th	(United States) Joshua Pollock	$128,500
5th	(United States) Adam Aronson	$102,800
6th	(Pakistan) Owais Ahmed	$77,100

=== WPT Grand Prix de Paris ===
- Casino: Aviation Club de France, Paris, France
- Buy-in: €7,500
- 6-Day Event: Sep 5–10, 2011
- Number of Entries: 312
- Total Prize Pool: €2,252,650
- Number of Payouts: 36
- Winning Hand: 9♣ 8♣

Final Table
Place	Name	Prize
1st	(United States) Matthew Waxman	€518,750
2nd	(France) Hugo Lemaire	€311,100
3rd	(France) Frederic Magen	€211,100
4th	(United States) Byron Kaverman	€155,550
5th	(Finland) Mikko Sundell	€133,330
6th	(Sweden) Martin Jacobson	€88,900
7th	(Lebanon) Dori Yacoub	€77,770
8th	(Russia) Dimitry Stelmak	€66,665

=== Borgata Poker Open ===
- Casino: Borgata Hotel Casino, Atlantic City, New Jersey
- Buy-in: $3300 + $200
- 5-Day Event: Sep 18–22, 2011
- Number of Entries: 1,313
- Total Prize Pool: $4,220,161
- Number of Payouts: 100
- Winning Hand: Q♠ 2♠

Final Table
Place	Name	Prize
1st	(United States) Bobby Oboodi	$922,441
2nd	(United States) Jin Hwang	$554,303
3rd	(United States) Daniel Buzgon	$335,433
4th	(United States) Fred Goldberg	$280,925
5th	(United States) Darren Elias	$230,610
6th	(England) Ricky Hale	$186,585

=== WPT Malta ===
- Casino: Casino at Portomaso, Portomaso
- Buy-in: €3000 + €300
- 5-Day Event: Sep 20–24, 2011
- Number of Entries: 240
- Total Prize Pool: €698,400
- Number of Payouts: 27
- Winning Hand: 9♣ 7♦

Final Table
Place	Name	Prize
1st	(United States) Matt Giannetti	€200,000
2nd	(Italy) Cecilia Pescaglini	€116,700
3rd	(Italy) Filippo Bianchini	€76,820
4th	(England) Simon Trumper	€53,430
5th	(France) Tristan Clemencon	€39,810
6th	(France) Fabien Sartoris	€30,730
7th	(Sweden) Christofer Williamson	€23,050
8th	(Sweden) Mats Karlson	€16,760

=== World Poker Finals ===
- Casino: Foxwoods Resort Casino, Mashantucket, Connecticut
- Buy-in: $9,700 + $300
- 6-Day Event: Oct 27 – Nov 1, 2011
- Number of Entries: 189
- Total Prize Pool: $1,778,550
- Number of Payouts: 27
- Winning Hand: A♣ K♠

Final Table
Place	Name	Prize
1st	(United States) Daniel Santoro	$449,910
2nd	(United States) Christian Harder	$248,962
3rd	(United States) Bob Carbone	$166,271
4th	(United States) Steven Brackesy	$129,816
5th	(United States) Andy Frankenberger	$99,585
6th	(United States) Eli Berg	$83,580

=== WPT Amnéville ===
- Casino: Seven Casino d Amnéville, Amnéville, France
- Buy-in: €3200 + €300
- 6-Day Event: Nov 1–6, 2011
- Number of Entries: 379
- Total Prize Pool: €1,167,866
- Number of Payouts: 36
- Winning Hand: 10♠ 10♦

Final Table
Place	Name	Prize
1st	(France) Adrien Allain	€336,133
2nd	(France) Jordane Ouin	€180,365
3rd	(France) Thibaud Guenegou	€113,580
4th	(United States) Scott Baumstein	€80,640
5th	(France) Michel Konieczny	€60,196
6th	(France) Arnaud Trouer	€47,700
7th	(Denmark) Anders Rasmussen	€35,780
8th	(France) Guillaume Maréchal	€26,690

=== WPT Jacksonville ===
- Casino: BestBet Poker Room at Orange Park, Orange Park, Florida
- Buy-in: $3,500
- 5-Day Event: Nov 18–22, 2011
- Number of Entries: 393
- Total Prize Pool: $1,277,250
- Number of Payouts: 40
- Winning Hand: K♣ J♥

Final Table
Place	Name	Prize
1st	(United States) Anthony Ruberto	$325,928
2nd	(United States) Sam Soverel	$187,762
3rd	(United States) Lisa Hamilton	$112,657
4th	(Portugal) Vitor Coelho	$75,105
5th	(United States) Artie Rodriguez	$55,077
6th	(United States) Darryll Fish	$46,315

=== WPT Marrakech ===
- Casino: Casino De Marrakech, Marrakesh
- Buy-in: €2700 + €300
- 4-Day Event: Nov 24–27, 2011
- Number of Entries: 274
- Total Prize Pool: €727,434
- Number of Payouts: 33
- Winning Hand: 8♣ 8♠

Final Table
Place	Name	Prize
1st	(Morocco) Mohamed Ali Houssam	€159,150
2nd	(Morocco) Toufik Ourini	€109,637
3rd	(Latvia) Maksims Martinous	€70,735
4th	(France) Arnaud Mattern	€45,982
5th	(Morocco) Hassan Faras	€33,602
6th	(France) Rodney Assous	€27,230
7th	(Canada) Jonathan Duhamel	€22,283
8th	(France) Bertrand "ElkY" Grospellier	€20,230

=== WPT Prague ===
- Casino: Corinthia Casino, Prague
- Buy-in: €3200 + €300
- 5-Day Event: Dec 1–5, 2011
- Number of Entries: 571
- Total Prize Pool: €1,753,200
- Number of Payouts: 63
- Winning Hand: A♥ 5♠

Final Table
Place	Name	Prize
1st	(Russia) Andrey Pateychuk	€450,000
2nd	(Spain) Adria Balaguer	€238,000
3rd	(Germany) Stanislaw Kretz	€158,000
4th	(France) Benjamin Pollak	€104,000
5th	(Norway) Sigur Eskeland	€80,000
6th	(Canada) Russell Carson	€63,000

=== Doyle Brunson Five Diamond World Poker Classic ===
- Casino: Bellagio, Las Vegas, Nevada
- Buy-in: $10,000 + $300
- 6-Day Event: Dec 6–11, 2011
- Number of Entries: 413
- Total Prize Pool: $4,006,100
- Number of Payouts: 100
- Winning Hand: K♥ Q♣

Final Table
Place	Name	Prize
1st	(England) James Dempsey	$821,612
2nd	(United States) Soi Nguyen	$517,478
3rd	(United States) Vanessa Selbst	$338,351
4th	(United States) Andrew Lichtenberger	$218,933
5th	(Portugal) Vitor Coelho	$159,224
6th	(United States) Antonio Esfandiari	$119,418

=== WPT Venice ===
- Casino: Casino di Venezia, Venice
- Buy-in: €3000 + €300
- 6-Day Event: Dec 13–18, 2011
- Number of Entries: 213
- Total Prize Pool: €600,830
- Number of Payouts: 27
- Winning Hand: 5♠ 5♣

Final Table
Place	Name	Prize
1st	(Italy) Edoardo Alescio	€194,000
2nd	(United States) Steve O'Dwyer	€95,930
3rd	(Italy) Michele Caroli	€66,090
4th	(Italy) Andrea Dato	€43,170
5th	(Italy) Andrea Benelli	€34,245
6th	(Ukraine) Alexander Dovzhenko	€27,035

=== WPT Ireland ===
- Casino: Citywest Hotel, Dublin
- Buy-in: €2500
- 4-Day Event: Jan 5–8, 2012
- Number of Entries: 338
- Total Prize Pool: €760,500
- Number of Payouts: 36
- Winning Hand: Q♣ Q♦

Final Table
Place	Name	Prize
1st	(England) David Shallow	€222,280
2nd	(England) Charles Chattha	€111,129
3rd	(Republic of Ireland) Ronan Gilligan	€74,090
4th	(Republic of Ireland) Patrick Vestin	€52,600
5th	(England) Steve Watts	€39,270
6th	(France) Steven Moreau	€31,120

=== WPT Venice Grand Prix ===
- Casino: Casino di Venezia, Venice
- Buy-in: €4,950 + €495
- 5-Day Event: Feb 6–10, 2012
- Number of Entries: 155
- Total Prize Pool: €678,880
- Number of Payouts: 18
- Winning Hand: 6♣ 4♣

Final Table
Place	Name	Prize
1st	(Russia) Rinat Bogdanov	€229,800
2nd	(Italy) Alessandro Longobardi	€111,700
3rd	(Italy) Andrea Dato	€72,275
4th	(Denmark) Simon Ravnsbaek	€52,565
5th	(Italy) Gianluca Trebbi	€42,705
6th	(Italy) Andrea Carini	€32,195

=== WPT Seminole Hard Rock Lucky Hearts Showdown ===
- Casino: Seminole Hard Rock Hotel and Casino, Hollywood, Florida
- Buy-in: $3,500
- 5-Day Event: Feb 10–14, 2012
- Number of Entries: 295
- Total Prize Pool: $958,750
- Number of Payouts: 27
- Winning Hand: 6♥ 4♣

Final Table
Place	Name	Prize
1st	(United States) Matt Juttelstad	$268,444
2nd	(Italy) Gigi Gagne	$158,194
3rd	(United States) Uri Kadosh	$105,463
4th	(United States) Sharon Levin	$73,344
5th	(United States) Todd Jacobson	$54,649
6th	(United States) Keith Ferrera	$42,185

=== WPT L.A. Poker Classic ===
- Casino: Commerce Casino, Los Angeles
- Buy-in: $9,600 + $400
- 6-Day Event: Feb 24–29, 2012
- Number of Entries: 549
- Total Prize Pool: $5,270,400
- Number of Payouts: 54
- Winning Hand: A♦ 5♦

Final Table
Place	Name	Prize
1st	(United States) Sean Jazayeri	$1,370,240
2nd	(United States) David Sands	$806,370
3rd	(United States) Dan Kelly	$521,770
4th	(United States) Noah Schwartz	$355,750
5th	(United States) Jason Burt	$252,980
6th	(United States) Jason Somerville	$202,910

=== WPT Bay 101 Shooting Star ===
- Casino: Bay 101 Casino, San Jose, California
- Buy-in: $9,500 + $500
- 5-Day Event: Mar 5–9, 2012
- Number of Entries: 364
- Total Prize Pool: $3,458,000
- Number of Payouts: 36
- Winning Hand: J♦ 7♦

Final Table
Place	Name	Prize
1st	(South Korea) Moon Kim	$960,900
2nd	(India) Ubaid Habib	$570,200
3rd	(United States) Joe Serock	$320,400
4th	(Canada) Erik Cajelais	$256,300
5th	(United States) Andrew Badecker	$192,300
6th	(United States) Joseph Elpayaa	$128,200

=== WPT Vienna ===
- Casino: Montesino Casino, Vienna
- Buy-in: €3,200 + €300
- 6-Day Event: Apr 10 – 15, 2012
- Number of Entries: 396
- Total Prize Pool: €1,267,200
- Number of Payouts: 45
- Winning Hand: A♥ 8♥

Final Table
Place	Name	Prize
1st	(Denmark) Morten Christensen	€313,390
2nd	(Russia) Konstantin Tolokno	€191,740
3rd	(Canada) Ben Wilinofsky	€122,910
4th	(Serbia) Ognjen Sekularac	€62,680
5th	(Germany) Goswin Siemsen	€62,680
6th	(Hungary) Norbert Szecsi	€49,100

=== WPT Seminole Hard Rock Showdown ===
- Casino: Seminole Hard Rock Hotel and Casino, Hollywood, Florida
- Buy-in: $9,600 + $400
- 6-Day Event: Apr 18–23, 2012
- Number of Entries: 290
- Total Prize Pool: $2,784,000
- Number of Payouts: 27
- Winning Hand: A♦ 10♦

Final Table
Place	Name	Prize
1st	(United States) Tommy Vedes	$779,520
2nd	(United States) John Dolan	$459,360
3rd	(United States) Joe Serock	$306,240
4th	(United States) Craig Bergeron	$212,976
5th	(United States) Sharon Levin	$158,688
6th	(United States) Kyle Bowker	$122,496

=== WPT Jacksonville BestBet Open ===
- Casino: BestBet Poker Room at Jacksonville, Jacksonville, Florida
- Buy-in: $4,700 + $300
- 6-Day Event: Apr 27 – May 2, 2012
- Number of Entries: 320
- Total Prize Pool: $1,504,000
- Number of Payouts: 36
- Winning Hand: 3♥ 3♠

Final Table
Place	Name	Prize
1st	(United States) Shawn Cunix	$400,600
2nd	(United States) James Calderaro	$236,560
3rd	(United States) Darren Elias	$147,850
4th	(United States) Daniel Buzgon	$94,624
5th	(United States) Tony Dunst	$66,532
6th	(United States) Will Failla	$54,704

=== WPT World Championship ===
- Casino: Bellagio, Las Vegas, Nevada
- Buy-in: $25,000 + $500
- 8-Day Event: May 19–26, 2012
- Number of Entries: 152
- Total Prize Pool: $3,660,500
- Number of Payouts: 18
- Winning Hand: K♣ K♠

Final Table
Place	Name	Prize
1st	(Germany) Marvin Rettenmaier	$1,196,858
2nd	(France) Philippe Ktorza	$805,310
3rd	(United States) Michael Mizrachi	$424,618
4th	(United States) Nick Schulman	$256,235
5th	(United States) Steve O'Dwyer	$192,176
6th	(United States) Trevor Pope	$155,571

== Other Events ==
During season 10 of the WPT there was one special event that did not apply to the Player of the Year standings:

- The WPT World Championship Super High Roller – May 23–25, 2012 – Bellagio – coincident with end of Event #22: WPT World Championship

== Season X Player of the Year ==
Joe Serock won Player of the Year.

Final Standings
Rank	Name	Points
1	Joe Serock	2,200
2	Will Failla	2,050
3	Moon Kim	1,900
4	Daniel Buzgon	1,750
5	Darren Elias	1,600
6	Marvin Rettenmaier	1,550

Top 6 players, including ties.
