= World Poker Tour season 12 results =

Below are the results for season 12 (XII) of the World Poker Tour:

== Results ==
=== Merit Cyprus Classic ===
- Casino: Merit Crystal Cove Hotel and Casino, Alsancak Mevkii Kyrenia, Cyprus
- Buy-in: $4,000 + $400
- 6-Day Event: August 16–21, 2013
- Number of Entries: 262
- Total Prize Pool: $1,000,000
- Number of Payouts: 27
- Winning Hand: A♠ 5♥

Final Table
Place	Name	Prize
1st	(Russia) Alexey Rybin	$258,000
2nd	(Lebanon) Albert Daher	$160,200
3rd	(Russia) Andrei Nikonov	$103,700
4th	(Turkey) Kayhan Tugrul	$75,600
5th	(Russia) Sergey Rybachenko	$56,600
6th	(Lebanon) Pierre Sayegh	$46,000

=== Legends of Poker ===
- Casino: The Bicycle Casino, Bell Gardens, California
- Buy-in: $3,500 + $200
- 7-Day Event: August 29-September 4, 2013
- Number of Entries: 716
- Total Prize Pool: $2,430,820
- Number of Payouts: 72
- Winning Hand: A♥ 9♥

Final Table
Place	Name	Prize
1st	(United States) Jordan Cristos	$613,355
2nd	(United States) Dan Heimiller	$356,115
3rd	(Trinidad and Tobago) Ryan Goindoo	$233,360
4th	(United States) Alexandru Masek	$156,790
5th	(United States) Phil Laak	$109,385
6th	(United States) John Gordon	$85,080

=== Borgata Poker Open ===
- Casino: Borgata, Atlantic City, New Jersey
- Buy-in: $3,300 + 200
- 6-Day Event: September 15–20, 2013
- Number of Entries: 1,189
- Total Prize Pool: $3,805,989
- Number of Payouts: 110
- Winning Hand: A♣ 6♦

Final Table
Place	Name	Prize
1st	(United States) Anthony Zinno	$825,099
2nd	(United States) Vanessa Selbst	$492,569
3rd	(United States) Cong Pham	$301,225
4th	(United States) Jeremy Kottler	$251,968
5th	(United States) David Randall	$208,394
6th	(United States) Eric Fields	$168,610

=== Grand Prix de Paris ===
- Casino: Aviation Club de France, Paris, France
- Buy-in: €7,500
- 6-Day Event: October 25–30, 2013
- Number of Entries: 187
- Total Prize Pool: €1,839,496
- Number of Payouts: 21
- Winning Hand: 10♠ 10♥

Final Table
Place	Name	Prize
1st	(United States) Mohsin Charania	€340,000
2nd	(Belarus) Vasili Firsau	€230,200
3rd	(Australia) Peter Apostolou	€148,050
4th	(Canada) Elliot Smith	€109,615
5th	(United States) Christina Lindley	€82,280
6th	(Finland) Kimmo Kurko	€65,790

=== Emperors Palace Poker Classic ===
- Casino: Emperors Palace Hotel Casino, Johannesburg, South Africa
- Buy-in: $3,300 + $300
- 5-Day Event: November 7–11, 2013
- Number of Entries: 191
- Total Prize Pool: $561,528
- Number of Payouts: 27
- Winning Hand: Q♠ 8♦

Final Table
Place	Name	Prize
1st	(South Africa) Daniel Brits	$132,128
2nd	(South Africa) Eugene Du Plessis	$92,708
3rd	(South Africa) Rob Fenner	$59,634
4th	(Germany) Dominik Nitsche	$44,136
5th	(South Africa) Wesley Wiegand	$33,130
6th	(South Africa) Ronit Chamani	$26,504

=== bestbet Jacksonville Fall Poker Scramble ===
- Casino: bestbet Jacksonville, Jacksonville, Florida
- Buy-in: $3,200 + $240
- 5-Day Event: November 15–19, 2013
- Number of Entries: 358
- Total Prize Pool: $1,145,600
- Number of Payouts: 45
- Winning Hand: 4♥ 2♥

Final Table
Place	Name	Prize
1st	(United States) Jared Jaffee	$252,749
2nd	(United States) Blake Purvis	$166,139
3rd	(United States) Michael Horchoff	$106,904
4th	(United States) Margo Costa	$79,114
5th	(United States) Corrie Wunstel	$59,335
6th	(United States) Randall Price	$47,468

=== WPT Caribbean ===
- Casino: Casino Royale, St. Maarten
- Buy-in: $3,200 + $300
- 6-Day Event: November 19–24, 2013
- Number of Entries: 191
- Total Prize Pool: $592,864
- Number of Payouts: 24
- Winning Hand: J♦ 2♥

Final Table
Place	Name	Prize
1st	(United States) Tony Dunst	$145,000
2nd	(Italy) Giacomo Fundaro	$100,000
3rd	(Austria) Severin Schleser	$63,500
4th	(Germany) Marvin Rettenmaier	$46,800
5th	(Austria) Zoltan Purak	$35,900
6th	(Netherlands) Robbie Bakker	$28,700

=== WPT Montreal ===
- Casino: Playground Poker Club, Kahnawake, Quebec
- Buy-in: $3,500 + $350
- 7-Day Event: November 29-December 5, 2013
- Number of Entries: 862
- Total Prize Pool: $2,738,435
- Number of Payouts: 99
- Winning Hand: Q♠ Q♦

Final Table
Place	Name	Prize
1st	(United States) Derrick Rosenbarger	$500,824
2nd	(United States) Mukul Pahuja	$340,928
3rd	(Canada) Serge Cantin	$220,170
4th	(Canada) Sylvain Siebert	$162,936
5th	(United States) Lily Kiletto	$121,848
6th	(Canada) Alexandre Lavigne	$98,574

=== Doyle Brunson Five Diamond World Poker Classic ===
- Casino: Bellagio, Las Vegas, Nevada
- Buy-in: $10,000 + $300
- 6-Day Event: December 6–11, 2013
- Number of Entries: 449
- Total Prize Pool: $4,355,300
- Number of Payouts: 45
- Winning Hand: K♠ 10♦

Final Table
Place	Name	Prize
1st	(United States) Dan Smith	$1,161,135
2nd	(Australia) Gary Benson	$672,685
3rd	(United States) Eddy Sabat	$436,160
4th	(United States) Shaun Suller	$303,793
5th	(United States) Barry Hutter	$219,165
6th	(United States) Joe Serock	$175,766

=== WPT South Korea ===
- Casino: Ramada Plaza Jeju, Jeju, South Korea
- Buy-in: $2,700 + $300
- 4-Day Event: December 16–19, 2013
- Number of Entries: 137
- Total Prize Pool: $358,803
- Number of Payouts: 21
- Winning Hand: 6♥ 5♥

Final Table
Place	Name	Prize
1st	(Japan) Masato Yokosawa	$100,000
2nd	(United States) Chris Park	$60,700
3rd	(United States) Hyunshik Hun	$38,500
4th	(Japan) Kosei Ichinose	$28,500
5th	(South Korea) Jae Kyung Sim	$21,400
6th	(Thailand) Chane Kampanatsanyakorn	$17,100

=== WPT Prague ===
- Casino: Card Casino Prague, Prague, Czech Republic
- Buy-in: €3,300
- 7-Day Event: December 15–21, 2013
- Number of Entries: 306
- Total Prize Pool: €881,550
- Number of Payouts: 36
- Winning Hand: A♥ K♠

Final Table
Place	Name	Prize
1st	(Germany) Julian Thomas	€206,230
2nd	(Belarus) Vasili Firsau	€135,000
3rd	(Russia) Andrey Shatilov	€85,000
4th	(Lithuania) Gintaras Simaitis	€63,000
5th	(Serbia) Ognjen Sekularac	€47,000
6th	(Bulgaria) Valeri Savov	€38,000

=== Borgata Winter Poker Open ===
- Casino: Borgata, Atlantic City, New Jersey
- Buy-in: $3,300 + $200
- 6-Day Event: January 26–31, 2014
- Number of Entries: 1,229
- Total Prize Pool: $3,934,029
- Number of Payouts: 120
- Winning Hand: Q♦ 3♦

Final Table
Place	Name	Prize
1st	(United States) Anthony Merulla	$842,379
2nd	(United States) David Paredes	$499,549
3rd	(United States) Anthony Maio	$307,565
4th	(United States) Jared Jaffee	$258,590
5th	(Russia) Vladislav Mezheritsky	$213,650
6th	(Colombia) Farid Jattin	$174,352

=== Lucky Hearts Poker Open ===
- Casino: Seminole Casino Coconut Creek, Coconut Creek, Florida
- Buy-in: $3,250 + $175 + $75
- 6-Day Event: February 7–12, 2014
- Number of Entries: 415
- Total Prize Pool: $1,348,750
- Number of Payouts: 54
- Winning Hand: 9♦ 8♦

Final Table
Place	Name	Prize
1st	(United States) James Calderaro	$271,103
2nd	(United States) Shannon Shorr	$190,039
3rd	(United States) Keven Stammen	$122,197
4th	(United States) Dimas Martinez	$90,366
5th	(United States) Tim Kegel	$67,842
6th	(United States) Evan Dollinger	$54,355

=== Fallsview Poker Classic ===
- Casino: Fallsview Casino, Niagara Falls, Ontario
- Buy-in: $5,000
- 3-Day Event: February 22–24, 2014
- Number of Entries: 383
- Total Prize Pool: $1,729,510
- Number of Payouts: 45
- Winning Hand: A♠ 5♠

Final Table
Place	Name	Prize
1st	(Canada) Matthew Lapossie	$342,266
2nd	(United States) Dylan Wilkerson	$228,806
3rd	(Canada) Jason James	$147,090
4th	(Canada) Spiro Mikrogianakis	$108,956
5th	(Canada) Josue Sauvageau	$81,716
6th	(United States) Howie Leung	$65,373

=== L.A. Poker Classic ===
- Casino: Commerce Casino, Commerce, California
- Buy-in: $9,600 + $400
- 6-Day Event: March 1–6, 2014
- Number of Entries: 534
- Total Prize Pool: $5,126,400
- Number of Payouts: 63
- Winning Hand: A♦ A♥

Final Table
Place	Name	Prize
1st	(England) Chris Moorman	$1,015,460
2nd	(United States) Glenn Lafaye	$662,840
3rd	(United States) Michael Rocco	$423,440
4th	(France) Patrick Bruel	$332,190
5th	(United States) Josh Neufeld	$264,520
6th	(United States) Adam Friedman	$200,440

=== Bay 101 Shooting Star ===
- Casino: Bay 101, San Jose, California
- Buy-in: $7,150 + $350
- 5-Day Event: March 10–14, 2014
- Number of Entries: 718
- Total Prize Pool: $5,133,700
- Number of Payouts: 72
- Winning Hand: 6♠ 4♦

Final Table
Place	Name	Prize
1st	(United States) James Carroll	$1,256,550
2nd	(United States) Dylan Wilkerson	$728,650
3rd	(United States) Shaun Suller	$477,470
4th	(United States) Mukul Pahuja	$320,800
5th	(United States) Nam Le	$223,810
6th	(United States) Garrett Greer	$174,080

=== WPT Venice Carnival ===
- Casino: Casino di Venezia Ca Vendramin Calergi, Venice, Italy
- Buy-in: €2,700 + €300
- 6-Day Event: March 10–15, 2014
- Number of Entries: 144
- Total Prize Pool: €377,136
- Number of Payouts: 18
- Winning Hand: 5♣ 5♠

Final Table
Place	Name	Prize
1st	(Italy) Andrea Dato	€105,000
2nd	(England) Sam Trickett	€66,000
3rd	(Italy) Maurizio Saieva	€42,000
4th	(Croatia) Mario Vojvoda	€31,000
5th	(Italy) Alessio Isaia	€24,000
6th	(Greece) Sotirios Koutoupas	€19,400

=== WPT Thunder Valley ===
- Casino: Thunder Valley Casino, Lincoln, California
- Buy-in: $3,200 + $300
- 5-Day Event: March 15–19, 2014
- Number of Entries: 465
- Total Prize Pool: $1,488,000
- Number of Payouts: 54
- Winning Hand: K♦ 4♣

Final Table
Place	Name	Prize
1st	(Vietnam) J. C. Tran	$302,750
2nd	(United States) Preston Harwell	$200,030
3rd	(United States) Quoc Pham	$127,140
4th	(United States) Mimi Luu	$100,240
5th	(United States) Benjamin Zamani	$80,130
6th	(United States) Ken Jorgensen	$60,180

=== Jacksonville bestbet Open ===
- Casino: bestbet Jacksonville, Jacksonville, Florida
- Buy-in: $3,200 + $240 + $60
- 5-Day Event: March 21–25, 2014
- Number of Entries: 258
- Total Prize Pool: $825,600
- Number of Payouts: 27
- Winning Hand: 10♣ 10♦

Final Table
Place	Name	Prize
1st	(United States) Nabil Hirezi	$206,041
2nd	(United States) James Calderaro	$133,764
3rd	(United States) Brian Green	$86,043
4th	(United States) Peter Le	$63,682
5th	(United States) Jordan Cristos	$47,802
6th	(United States) Faraz Jaka	$38,241

=== Seminole Hard Rock Showdown ===
- Casino: Seminole Hard Rock Hotel and Casino, Hollywood, Florida
- Buy-in: $3,500
- 7-Day Event: April 10–16, 2014
- Number of Entries: 1,795
- Total Prize Pool: $5,763,150
- Number of Payouts: 170
- Winning Hand: 8♦ 8♥

Final Table
Place	Name	Prize
1st	(Canada) Eric Afriat	$1,081,184
2nd	(United States) Mukul Pahuja	$691,965
3rd	(United States) James Mackey	$441,128
4th	(United States) Jacob Bazeley	$371,931
5th	(United States) Matt Stout	$308,501
6th	(United States) Chance Kornuth	$247,954

=== WPT World Championship ===
- Casino: Borgata, Atlantic City, New Jersey
- Buy-in: $15,000 + $400
- 5-Day Event: April 22–26, 2014
- Number of Entries: 328
- Total Prize Pool: $4,852,400
- Number of Payouts: 36
- Winning Hand: A♣ 8♠

Final Table
Place	Name	Prize
1st	(United States) Keven Stammen	$1,350,000
2nd	(United States) Byron Kaverman	$727,860
3rd	(United States) Tony Dunst	$452,729
4th	(United States) Ryan D'Angelo	$363,930
5th	(United States) Curt Kohlberg	$286,292
6th	(United States) Abraham Korotki	$235,341
