= World Poker Tour season 23 results =

2025 schedule and results for poker series

Below are the results for season 23 (XXIII) of the World Poker Tour, the WPT Main Tour events for 2025.

== Results ==
=== WPT Cambodia Championship ===
- Casino: NagaWorld Integrated Resort, Phnom Penh, Cambodia
- Buy-in: $3,500
- 6-Day Event: January 19-24, 2025
- Number of Entries: 750
- Total Prize Pool: $2,400,750
- Number of Payouts: 94

Final Table
Place	Name	Prize
1st	(Russia) Artem Vezhenkov	$390,650
2nd	(Netherlands) Ronald Haverkamp	$255,000
3rd	(England) Ankit Ahuja	$189,000
4th	(Thailand) Supakit Anukoolpitaknil	$142,000
5th	(Germany) Dominik Nitsche	$107,000
6th	(United Kingdom) Daniel Charlton	$82,000

*First-place amount includes the winner's $10,400 entry into the season-ending WPT World Championship at Wynn Las Vegas.

=== (United States) WPT Rolling Thunder ===
- Casino: Thunder Valley Casino Resort, Lincoln, California
- Buy-in: $3,500
- 4-Day Event: March 16-19, 2025
- Number of Entries: 404
- Total Prize Pool: $1,292,800
- Number of Payouts: 51

Final Table
Place	Name	Prize
1st	(United States) Shawn Daniels	$257,600
2nd	(United States) Harvey Castro	$165,000
3rd	(Canada) Eric Afriat	$122,000
4th	(United States) Paul Richardson	$91,000
5th	(United States) David Ha	$69,000
6th	(United States) Benjamin Primus	$53,000

*First-place amount includes the winner's $10,400 entry into the season-ending WPT World Championship at Wynn Las Vegas.

=== (United States) Seminole Hard Rock Poker Showdown ===
- Casino: Seminole Hard Rock Hotel & Casino, Hollywood, Florida
- Buy-in: $3,500
- 6-Day Event: April 4-8, 2025 + Final Table May 29, 2025 (Las Vegas)
- Number of Entries: 1,755
- Total Prize Pool: $5,616,000
- Number of Payouts: 221

Final Table
Place	Name	Prize
1st	(United States) Arthur Peacock	$776,000
2nd	(Romania) Mihai Niste	$515,000
3rd	(United States) Daniel Marcus	$380,000
4th	(England) Mitchell Hynam	$285,000
5th	(United States) Jared Hemingway	$215,000
6th	(United States) Jeffery Fritz	$164,000

*First-place amount includes the winner's $10,400 entry into the season-ending WPT World Championship at Wynn Las Vegas.

=== (United States) WPT Choctaw Championship ===
- Casino: Choctaw Casino & Resort, Durant, Oklahoma
- Buy-in: $3,800
- 5-Day Event: May 1-5, 2025 + Final Table May 30, 2025 (Las Vegas)
- Number of Entries: 586
- Total Prize Pool: $2,051,000
- Number of Payouts: 74

Final Table
Place	Name	Prize
1st	(United States) Mike Vanier	$338,000
2nd	(United States) Mason Vieth	$220,000
3rd	(United States) Lifu Zhang	$163,000
4th	(United States) Charles Adkins	$122,000
5th	(United States) Ryan Brown	$92,000
6th	(United States) Logan Hoover	$70,000

*First-place amount includes the winner's $10,400 entry into the season-ending WPT World Championship at Wynn Las Vegas.

=== (United States) WPT Venetian Las Vegas Championship ===
- Casino: The Venetian Las Vegas, Las Vegas, Nevada
- Buy-in: $5,000
- 7-Day Event: July 11-17, 2025
- Number of Entries: 5861,153
- Total Prize Pool: $5,303,800
- Number of Payouts: 145

Final Table
Place	Name	Prize
1st	(Argentina) Nicolás Betbesé	$706,960
2nd	(Dominican Republic) Francis Cruz	$623,540
3rd	(Austria) Oliver Bösch	$395,000
4th	(Romania) Iulian Blebea	$295,000
5th	(Dominican Republic) Elvyn Santos	$220,000
6th	(Republic of Ireland) Jamie Flynn	$169,000

*First-place amount includes the winner's $10,400 entry into the season-ending WPT World Championship at Wynn Las Vegas.

=== WPT Cyprus Championship ===
- Casino: Chamada Prestige Hotel & Spa, Kyrenia, Northern Cyprus, Cyprus
- Buy-in: $3,500
- 6-Day Event: August 13-18, 2025
- Number of Entries: 775
- Guaranteed Prize Pool: $2,402,500
- Number of Payouts: 97

Final Table
Place	Name	Prize
1st	(Georgia (country)) Ilia Kitsbabashvili	$401,100*
2nd	(United Kingdom) James Mahone	$255,000
3rd	(Slovakia) Rafal Chmura	$190,000
4th	(Russia) Elena Litviniuk	$142,000
5th	(Russia) Nikolay Zhadanov	$107,000
6th	(Belarus) Uladzimir Zhyharau	$82,000

*First-place amount includes the winner's $10,400 entry into the season-ending WPT World Championship at Wynn Las Vegas.

=== WPT Australia ===
- Casino: The Star Gold Coast, Gold Coast, Australia
- Buy-in: $5,500
- 5-Day Event: September 27-October 1, 2025
- Number of Entries: 600
- Total Prize Pool: A$3,000,000 (~$1,979,989)
- Number of Payouts: 75

Final Table
Place	Name	Prize A$-(U$D)
1st	(Australia) Alan Pham	A$558,211 (~$368,417)
2nd	(Australia) Jordan Bautista	A$371,693 (~$245,316)
3rd	(Australia) Jarrod Thatcher	A$273,928 (~$180,791)
4th	(Australia) Luo Liu	A$203,971 (~$134,620)
5th	(Australia) Corey Kempson	A$153,458 (~$101,282)
6th	(New Zealand) Jiaxu Chen	A$116,656 (~$76,993)

*First-place amount includes the winner's $10,400 entry into the season-ending WPT World Championship at Wynn Las Vegas.

=== (United States) WPT Bay 101 Shooting Star Championship ===
- Casino: Bay 101, San Jose, California
- Buy-in: $5,300
- 5+1-Day Event: October 25-29, 2025 + Final Table at WPT World Championship at Wynn Las Vegas - December 13-19,2025
- Number of Entries: 672
- Guaranteed Prize Pool: $3,028,100
- Number of Payouts: 84

Final Table
Place	Name	Prize
1st	(United States) Kharlin Sued	$480,700
2nd	(United States) Danny Wong	$315,000
3rd	(Indonesia) Alfie Poetra	$235,000
4th	(United States) Matthew Widdoes	$175,000
5th	(United States) Daniel Maor	$132,000
6th	(United States) Chance Kornuth	$101,000

*First-place amount includes the winner's $10,400 entry into the season-ending WPT World Championship at Wynn Las Vegas.

=== (United States) WPT bestbet Scramble ===
- Casino: bestbet Jacksonville, Jacksonville, Florida
- Buy-in: $5,000
- 5-Day Event: November 14–18, 2025
- Number of Entries: 327
- Total Prize Pool: $1,487,850
- Number of Payouts: 41

Final Table
Place	Name	Prize
1st	(United States) Connor Rash	$315,350
2nd	(United States) Dylan Smith	$200,000
3rd	(United States) Byron Kaverman	$150,000
4th	(United States) Russell Dizer	$112,000
5th	(United States) Matthew Ahern	$85,000
6th	(United States) Jessica Dawley	$65,000

*First-place amount includes the winner's $10,400 entry into the season-ending WPT World Championship at Wynn Las Vegas.

=== (United States) Seminole Rock 'N' Roll Poker Open ===
- Casino: Seminole Hard Rock Hotel & Casino, Hollywood, Florida
- Buy-in: $3,500
- 6-Day Event: November 28-December 3, 2025
- Number of Entries: 1,224
- Total Prize Pool: $3,916,800
- Number of Payouts: 153

Final Table
Place	Name	Prize
1st	(United States) Kevin Nee	$605,100
2nd	(United States) Joel Gola	$395,000
3rd	(United States) Aram Zobian	$295,000
4th	(United States) Chad Eveslage	$220,000
5th	(United States) Anthony Merlo	$166,000
6th	(United States) Hyndi Khomutetsky	$127,000

*First-place amount includes the winner's $10,400 entry into the season-ending WPT World Championship at Wynn Las Vegas.

=== (United States) WPT World Championship at Wynn Las Vegas ===
- Casino: Wynn Las Vegas, Las Vegas, Nevada
- Buy-in: $10,400
- 5-Day Event: December 13–19, 2025
- Number of Entries: 1,865
- Total Prize Pool: $18,277,000
- Number of Payouts: 233

Final Table
Place	Name	Prize
1st	(United States) Schuyler Thornton	$2,258,856
2nd	(United States) Soheb Porbandarwala	$1,969,344
3rd	(United States) Jeremy Brown	$1,250,000
4th	(United States) Chad Lipton	$940,000
5th	(United States) Jeremy Becker	$710,000
6th	(United States) Maxx Coleman	$540,000
