= World Poker Tour season 13 results =

Below are the results for season 13 (XIII) of the World Poker Tour (2014–15).

== Results ==
=== WPT500 at ARIA Resort & Casino ===
- Casino: ARIA Resort & Casino, Las Vegas, Nevada
- Buy-in: $500 + $65
- 6-Day Event: July 4–9, 2014
- Number of Entries: 3,599
- Total Prize Pool: $1,799,500
- Number of Payouts: 432

Final Table
Place	Name	Prize
1st	(South Korea) Sean Yu	$260,000
2nd	(United States) Kareem Marshall	$180,000
3rd	(United States) Scott Clements	$120,500
4th	(United States) Christian Harder	$90,000
5th	(United States) Jeffrey Ray	$70,000
6th	(United States) Luis Nargentino	$55,000
7th	(France) Brian Benhamou	$45,000
8th	(United States) Terry Fleischer	$35,000
9th	(United States) Messadek Soufiane	$26,000

=== Legends of Poker ===
- Casino: The Bicycle Casino, Bell Gardens, California
- Buy-in: $3,500 + $200 ($10,000 on Day 2)
- 7-Day Event: August 23–29, 2014
- Number of Entries: 593
- Total Prize Pool: $2,172,994
- Number of Payouts: 54

Final Table
Place	Name	Prize
1st	(United States) Harry Arutyunyan	$576,369
2nd	(United States) Mike Eskandari	$330,110
3rd	(United States) Tyler Kenney	$213,600
4th	(United States) Taylor McFarland	$145,640
5th	(United States) Tyler Cornell	$103,560
6th	(United States) Jeremy Kottler	$83,075

=== Merit Classic North Cyprus ===
- Casino: Merit Crystal Cove Hotel and Casino, Alsancak Mevkii Kyrenia, Cyprus
- Buy-in: $4,000 + 400
- 6-Day Event: September 5–10, 2014
- Number of Entries: 404
- Total Prize Pool: $1,486,720
- Number of Payouts: 45

Final Table
Place	Name	Prize
1st	(Russia) Alexander Lakhov	$325,400
2nd	(Russia) Dmitry Gromov	$215,000
3rd	(Lebanon) Nicolas Chouity	$140,000
4th	(England) Toby Lewis	$102,820
5th	(Israel) Ori Miller	$77,000
6th	(Russia) Igor Devkin	$62,000

=== Borgata Poker Open ===
- Casino: Borgata, Atlantic City, New Jersey
- Buy-in: $3,300 + $200
- 6-Day Event: September 14–19, 2014
- Number of Entries: 1,226
- Total Prize Pool: $3,924,426
- Number of Payouts: 120

Final Table
Place	Name	Prize
1st	(United States) Darren Elias	$843,744
2nd	(United States) Kane Kalas	$500,364
3rd	(United States) Jose Serratos	$308,067
4th	(United States) Aaron Overton	$259,012
5th	(United States) Blake Bohn	$213,999
6th	(United States) Ray Qartomy	$174,637

=== WPT Caribbean ===
- Casino: Casino Royale, Maho Bay, St. Maarten
- Buy-in: $3,200 + $300
- 5-Day Event: November 3–7, 2014
- Number of Entries: 118
- Total Prize Pool: $366,272
- Number of Payouts: 15
- Note: Elias became the first player to win back-to-back WPT titles in the same season.

Final Table
Place	Name	Prize
1st	(United States) Darren Elias	$127,680
2nd	(France) Christophe Rosso	$64,900
3rd	(Barbados) George Griffith	$42,100
4th	(United States) Mike Linster	$28,950
5th	(Slovenia) Ziga Jamnikar	$22,280
6th	(Romania) Dan Murariu	$17,370

=== bestbet Bounty Scramble ===
- Casino: bestbet Jacksonville, Jacksonville, Florida
- Buy-in: $4,650 + $350
- 5-Day Event: November 7–11, 2014
- Number of Entries: 461
- Total Prize Pool: $2,143,652
- Number of Payouts: 54

Final Table
Place	Name	Prize
1st	(United States) Ryan Van Sanford	$421,068
2nd	(United States) Chris Bolek	$284,371
3rd	(United States) Brian Reinert	$182,853
4th	(United States) Jared Reinstein	$135,223
5th	(United States) Jason Helder	$101,518
6th	(United States) Corey Hochman	$81,335

=== WPT500 at Dusk Till Dawn ===
- Casino: Dusk Till Dawn Casino & Poker, Lenton, Nottingham, England
- Buy-in: £500
- 8-Day Event: November 9–16, 2014
- Number of Entries: 2,133
- Total Prize Pool: £959,850
- Number of Payouts: 200

Final Table
Place	Name	Prize
1st	(England) Eleanor Gudger	£140,000
2nd	(England) Matthew Noonan	£85,000
3rd	(England) Hamid Roushanaei	£55,000
4th	(United States) Derek Payne	£35,000
5th	(South Africa) James Parker	£25,000
6th	(England) Richard Buck	£17,850
7th	(England) Haroon Hussain	£13,250
8th	(England) Habib Chatoo	£10,000

=== Emperors Palace Poker Classic ===
- Casino: Emperors Palace Hotel Casino, Johannesburg, South Africa
- Buy-in: $3,300 + $200
- 3-Day Event: November 14–16, 2014
- Number of Entries: 166
- Total Prize Pool: $547,800
- Number of Payouts: 18

Final Table
Place	Name	Prize
1st	(United States) Dylan Wilkerson	$147,509
2nd	(South Africa) Richard Barnard	$85,651
3rd	(South Africa) Diane Crous	$54,721
4th	(South Africa) Chris Convery	$38,543
5th	(United States) Aaron Overton	$29,740
6th	(South Africa) Darryn Lipman	$22,602

=== WPT UK ===
- Casino: Dusk Till Dawn Casino & Poker, Lenton, Nottingham, England
- Buy-in: £3,000
- 6-Day Event: November 18–23, 2014
- Number of Entries: 354
- Total Prize Pool: £955,800
- Number of Payouts: 45

Final Table
Place	Name	Prize
1st	(Lithuania) Matas Cimbolas	£200,000
2nd	(England) Ben Warrington	£140,000
3rd	(England) Tamer Kamel	£92,000
4th	(France) Antoine Saout	£67,000
5th	(England) Phillip Mighall	£48,000
6th	(England) Patrick Leonard	£39,500

=== WPT Montreal ===
- Casino: Playground Poker Club, Kahnawake, Quebec
- Buy-in: $3,500 + $350
- 7-Day Event: November 20–26, 2014
- Number of Entries: 732
- Total Prize Pool: $2,301,066
- Number of Payouts: 90

Final Table
Place	Name	Prize
1st	(United States) Jonathan Jaffe	$463,432
2nd	(Canada) Ratharam Sivagnanam	$313,318
3rd	(United States) Mukul Pahuja	$201,920
4th	(United States) Kevin MacPhee	$149,340
5th	(Canada) Samuel Chartier	$111,820
6th	(Canada) Guillaume Nolet	$90,350

=== Five Diamond World Poker Classic ===
- Casino: Bellagio, Las Vegas, Nevada
- Buy-in: $10,000 + $300
- 6-Day Event: December 15–20, 2014
- Number of Entries: 586
- Total Prize Pool: $5,684,200
- Number of Payouts: 54

Final Table
Place	Name	Prize
1st	(United States) Mohsin Charania	$1,477,890
2nd	(United States) Garrett Greer	$869,683
3rd	(United States) Brett Shaffer	$562,736
4th	(United States) Ryan Julius	$383,684
5th	(United States) Ryan Fee	$272,842
6th	(Germany) Tobias Reinkemeier	$218,842

=== Borgata Winter Poker Open ===
- Casino: Borgata, Atlantic City, New Jersey
- Buy-in: $3,300 + $200
- 6-Day Event: January 25–30
- Number of Entries: 989
- Total Prize Pool: $3,165,789
- Number of Payouts: 90

Final Table
Place	Name	Prize
1st	(United States) Aaron Mermelstein	$712,305
2nd	(United States) Eugene Todd	$419,467
3rd	(United States) Randy Pfeifer	$253,263
4th	(United States) Shawn Cunix	$212,108
5th	(United States) Esther Taylor-Brady	$174,118
6th	(United States) Justin Liberto	$140,878

=== Lucky Hearts Poker Open ===
- Casino: Seminole Hard Rock Hotel and Casino, Hollywood, Florida
- Buy-in: $3,200 + $200 + $100
- 7-Day Event: February 5–11
- Number of Entries: 1,027
- Total Prize Pool: $3,286,400
- Number of Payouts: 100

Final Table
Place	Name	Prize
1st	(United States) Brian Altman	$723,008
2nd	(United States) Mark Dube	$434,462
3rd	(United States) Kelly Minkin	$262,912
4th	(United States) Greg Rosen	$220,189
5th	(United States) Sanjay Gehi	$180,752
6th	(United States) Jon Graham	$146,245

=== Fallsview Poker Classic ===
- Casino: Fallsview Casino, Niagara Falls, Ontario
- Buy-in: $4,700 + $300
- 4-Day Event: February 13–16
- Number of Entries: 419
- Total Prize Pool: $1,910,221
- Number of Payouts: 54

Final Table
Place	Name	Prize
1st	(United States) Anthony Zinno	$380,021
2nd	(United States) Mark Bailey	$266,394
3rd	(United States) Corey Hochman	$171,294
4th	(Canada) David Cloutier	$126,674
5th	(United States) Jeremy Halaska	$95,100
6th	(Canada) Erik Cajelais	$76,194

=== L.A. Poker Classic ===
- Casino: Commerce Casino, Commerce, California
- Buy-in: $9,600 + $400
- 6-Day Event: February 28-March 5
- Number of Entries: 538
- Total Prize Pool: $5,164,800
- Number of Payouts: 63

Final Table
Place	Name	Prize
1st	(United States) Anthony Zinno	$1,015,860
2nd	(Canada) Mike Leah	$701,350
3rd	(United States) Chris Klodnicki	$451,090
4th	(Ukraine) Igor Yaroshevskyy	$333,680
5th	(United States) Peter Neff	$250,260
6th	(United States) Peter Tran	$200,830

=== Bay 101 Shooting Star ===
- Casino: Bay 101, San Jose, California
- Buy-in: $7,150 + $350
- 5-Day Event: March 9–13
- Number of Entries: 708
- Total Prize Pool: $5,062,200
- Number of Payouts: 72

Final Table
Place	Name	Prize
1st	(United States) Taylor Paur	$1,214,200
2nd	(United States) Isaac Baron	$704,200
3rd	(United States) Jacob Bazeley	$461,470
4th	(Canada) Sorel Mizzi	$310,060
5th	(United States) Faraz Jaka	$216,320
6th	(United States) Ravee Mathi Sundar	$168,260

=== WPT Vienna ===
- Casino: Montesino, Vienna, Austria
- Buy-in: €3,000 + €300
- 6-Day Event: March 12–17
- Number of Entries: 220
- Total Prize Pool: €660,000
- Number of Payouts: 27

Final Table
Place	Name	Prize
1st	(Germany) Konstantinos Nanos	€150,000
2nd	(Austria) Vladimir Krastev	€103,000
3rd	(France) Thomas Bichon	€65,000
4th	(Austria) Andreas Freund	€49,000
5th	(France) Gaelle Baumann	€35,500
6th	(Greece) Sotirios Koutoupas	€29,500

=== WPT Rolling Thunder ===
- Casino: Thunder Valley Casino Resort, Lincoln, California
- Buy-in: $3,200 + $300
- 5-Day Event: March 14–18
- Number of Entries: 379
- Total Prize Pool: $1,212,800
- Number of Payouts: 45

Final Table
Place	Name	Prize
1st	(United States) Ravee Mathi Sundar	$266,857
2nd	(United States) Jesse Rockowitz	$176,018
3rd	(United States) Taylor Paur	$113,154
4th	(United States) Harrison Gimbel	$83,818
5th	(United States) Rex Clinkscales	$62,864
6th	(United States) Jeff Griffiths	$50,291

=== Seminole Hard Rock Poker Showdown ===
- Casino: Seminole Hard Rock Hotel and Casino, Hollywood, Florida
- Buy-in: $3,200 + $200 + $100
- 7-Day Event: April 16–22
- Number of Entries: 1,476
- Total Prize Pool: $5,000,000
- Number of Payouts: 150

Final Table
Place	Name	Prize
1st	(United States) Griffin Paul	$1,000,000
2nd	(United States) Joe Ebanks	$615,000
3rd	(United States) Andre Crooks	$383,000
4th	(United States) Shawn Nguyen	$323,500
5th	(United States) Brian Green	$269,000
6th	(Canada) Ryan Rivers	$217,500

=== WPT World Championship ===
- Casino: Borgata, Atlantic City, New Jersey
- Buy-in: $15,000 + $400
- 6-Day Event: April 24–29
- Number of Entries: 239
- Total Prize Pool: $3,462,050
- Number of Payouts: 27

Final Table
Place	Name	Prize
1st	(United States) Asher Conniff	$973,683
2nd	(Russia) Alexander Lakhov	$573,779
3rd	(United States) Brian Yoon	$330,358
4th	(Colombia) Carlos Mortensen	$267,764
5th	(United States) Ray Qartomy	$208,647
6th	(United States) Tony Dunst	$173,873

== Other events ==
During season 13 of the WPT there was one special event that did not apply to the Player of the Year standings:

- The WPT Monster Invitational - September 21, 2009 - Borgata Casino - postscript to Event #4: Borgata Poker Open. Won by David Williams.
