= World Poker Tour season 22 results =

2024 schedule and results for poker series

Below are the results for season 22 (XXII) of the World Poker Tour, the WPT Main Tour events for 2024. There were ten scheduled WPT Main Tour events for the season, starting with the WPT Cambodia Championship in January, and – as of April 2024 – scheduled to be ending with an eleventh event, the WPT World Championship, in December.

== Results ==
=== WPT Cambodia Championship ===
- Casino: NagaWorld Integrated Resort, Phnom Penh, Cambodia
- Buy-in: $3,500
- 5-Day Event: January 25–29, 2024
- Number of Entries: 760
- Total Prize Pool: $2,432,760
- Number of Payouts: 95

Final Table
Place	Name	Prize
1st	(Germany) Konstantin Held	$361,310
2nd	(Australia) Joshua Mccully	$277,291
3rd	(France) Florent Remi	$211,819
4th	(Japan) Motoyoshi Okamura	$157,858
5th	(India) Amit Kaushik	$118,906
6th	(Vietnam) Kyle Diep	$90,532

=== WPT Rolling Thunder ===
- Casino: Thunder Valley Casino Resort, Lincoln, California
- Buy-in: $3,500
- 4-Day Event: March 23–26, 2024
- Number of Entries: 458
- Total Prize Pool: $1,465,600
- Number of Payouts: 58

Final Table
Place	Name	Prize
1st	(United States) Casey Sandretto	$246,600
2nd	(United States) Mike Kinney	$235,000
3rd	(United States) Mark Travis Egbert	$140,000
4th	(United States) Yunkyu Song	$105,000
5th	(United States) Cody Wiegmann	$78,000
6th	(United States) Brock Wilson	$60,000

=== WPT Voyage Championship ===
- Casino: Virgin Voyages Cruise
- Buy-in: $5,000
- 4-Day Event: April 1–4, 2024
- Number of Entries: 293
- Total Prize Pool: $1,347,800
- Number of Payouts: 37

Final Table
Place	Name	Prize
1st	(United States) Aram Oganyan	$214,245
2nd	(Mexico) Carlo Basurto	$202,885
3rd	(United States) Austin Srur	$188,670
4th	(Colombia) Farid Jattin	$100,000
5th	(United States) Daniel Sepiol	$75,000
6th	(Brazil) Romulo Dorea	$55,000

=== Seminole Hard Rock Poker Showdown ===
- Casino: Seminole Hard Rock Hotel & Casino, Hollywood, Florida
- Buy-in: $3,500
- 6-Day Event: April 19–23, 2024 (Final Table: May 29, 2024)
- Number of Entries: 1,869
- Total Prize Pool: $5,980,800
- Number of Payouts: 234

Final Table
Place	Name	Prize
1st	(United States) Joshua Reichard	$839,300
2nd	(United States) Landon Tice	$550,000
3rd	(United States) Jesse Lonis	$410,000
4th	(United States) Alexander Queen	$305,000
5th	(United States) Dylan Smith	$230,000
6th	(United States) Aaron Kupin	$176,000

=== WPT Choctaw Championship ===
- Casino: Choctaw Casino & Resort, Durant, Oklahoma
- Buy-in: $3,800
- 4-Day Event: May 3–6, 2024
- Number of Entries: 603
- Guaranteed Prize Pool: $2,110,500
- Number of Payouts: 76

Final Table
Place	Name	Prize
1st	(United States) James Mackey	$361,600
2nd	(Canada) Eric Afriat	$235,000
3rd	(United States) Adam Hendrix	$175,000
4th	(Canada) Sebastien Aube	$131,000
5th	(United States) Daniel Marx	$99,000
6th	(United States) Erick Lindgren	$75,000

=== WPT Montreal Championship ===
- Casino: Playground Poker Club, Kahnawake, Quebec, Canada
- Buy-in: C$3,500
- 4-Day Event: May 16–22, 2024
- Number of Entries: 882
- Guaranteed Prize Pool: C$2,822,400
- Number of Payouts: 111

Final Table
Place	Name	Prize
1st	(Canada) David Dongwoo Ko	C$434,900
2nd	(Moldova) Dan Stavila	C$280,000
3rd	(Canada) Tommy Nguyen	C$205,000
4th	(Lebanon) Rayan Chamas	C$155,000
5th	(Canada) Tamer Alkamli	C$117,000
6th	(United States) Charles Kassin	C$89,000

=== WPT Cambodia Passport to the World Championship ===
- Casino: NagaWorld Integrated Resort, Phnom Penh, Cambodia
- Buy-in: $1,300
- 5-Day Event: July 18–22, 2024
- Number of Entries: 913
- Total Prize Pool: $1,040,592
- Number of Payouts: 115

Final Table
Place	Name	Prize
1st	(China) Sha Chengchun	$187,772
2nd	(China) Xiaosheng Zheng	$118,130
3rd	(China) Cheng Zhang	$87,460
4th	(Vietnam) Anh Tuan Ho	$64,410
5th	(France) Adrien Berger	$48,560
6th	(Vietnam) Ngoc Pham	$37,010

=== WPT Australia ===
- Casino: The Star Gold Coast, Gold Coast, Australia
- Buy-in: AU$8,000
- 5-Day Event: September 20–25, 2024
- Number of Entries: 396
- Total Prize Pool: AU$2,930,400
- Number of Payouts: 50

Final Table
Place	Name	Prize
1st	(Australia) James Obst	A$585,359
2nd	(Australia) Travis Endersby	A$389,478
3rd	(Australia) Daniel Murphy	A$285,669
4th	(Australia) Oleg Ivanchenko	A$211,929
5th	(Australia) Matthew Wakeman	A$159,024
6th	(England) Dillan Patel	A$120,694

=== WPT Playground ===
- Casino: Playground Poker Club, Kahnawake, Quebec
- Buy-in: C$3,500
- 7-Day Event: October 24–30, 2024
- Number of Entries: 840
- Total Prize Pool: C$2,688,000
- Number of Payouts: 105

Final Table
Place	Name	Prize (CAD)
1st	(United States) Michael Wang	C$412,300
2nd	(Canada) Santiago Plante	C$265,000
3rd	(Canada) Baron Ha	C$196,000
4th	(Canada) Jordan Grant	C$146,000
5th	(United States) Zachary Fischer	C$111,000
6th	(Canada) Amirpasha Emami	C$84,000

=== WPT bestbet Scramble ===
- Casino: bestbet Jacksonville, Jacksonville, Florida
- Buy-in: $5,000
- 5-Day Event: November 15–19, 2024
- Number of Entries: 361
- Total Prize Pool: $1,642,550
- Number of Payouts: 46

Final Table
Place	Name	Prize
1st	(Chile) Nick Yunis	$315,791
2nd	(United States) Yunkyu Song	$252,059
3rd	(Canada) Eric Afriat	$165,000
4th	(United States) Joe Jordan	$123,000
5th	(United States) Nicholas Funaro	$93,000
6th	(United States) Michael Jagroo	$71,000

=== WPT Korea ===
- Casino: Jeju Shinhwa World, Landing Casino, Jeju
- Buy-in: KRW2,500,000 (~$1,795)
- 7-Day Event: November 15–21, 2024
- Number of Entries: 667
- Total Prize Pool: KRW1,680,000,000 (~$1,206,430)
- Number of Payouts: 96

Final Table
Place	Name	Prize
1st	(China) Chenxiang Miao	KRW300,000,000
2nd	(China) Dingding Guan	KRW200,000,000
3rd	(China) Li Dong	KRW150,000,000
4th	(China) Baojie Lin	KRW110,000,000
5th	(Singapore) Li Yong	KRW80,000,000
6th	(Japan) Kimura Takeo	KRW55,000,000

=== Seminole Rock 'N' Roll Poker Open ===
- Casino: Seminole Hard Rock Hotel & Casino, Hollywood, Florida
- Buy-in: $3,500
- 6-Day Event: November 29-December 4, 2024
- Number of Entries: 1,435
- Total Prize Pool: $4,592,000
- Number of Payouts: 181

Final Table
Place	Name	Prize
1st	(United States) Dylan Smith	$662,200
2nd	(United States) Matthew Beinner	$440,000
3rd	(France) Florian Ribouchon	$440,000
4th	(United States) Landon Tice	$440,000
5th	(United States) Francis Anderson	$184,000
6th	(United States) Paul Domb	$140,000

=== WPT World Championship at Wynn Las Vegas ===
- Casino: Wynn Las Vegas, Las Vegas, Nevada
- Buy-in: $10,400
- 5-Day Event: December 3–20, 2024
- Number of Entries: 2,392
- Total Prize Pool: $23,441,600
- Number of Payouts: 299

Final Table
Place	Name	Prize
1st	(United States) Scott Stewart	$2,563,900
2nd	(England) Rob Sherwood	$2,200,000
3rd	(United States) Edward Pak	$2,000,000
4th	(England) Chris Moorman	$1,150,000
5th	(South Korea) Ryan Yu	$875,000
6th	(Venezuela) Christian Roberts	$665,000
