= World Poker Tour =

Poker tour held worldwide

- Current season, competition or edition: World Poker Tour season 23 results
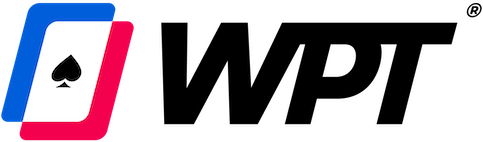
- Sport: Poker
- Founded: May 27, 2002
- CEO: Adam Pliska
- Country: United States (Founded)
- Most titles: (United States) Darren Elias (4)
- Broadcasters: CBS Sports Network, BT Sport (UK)
- Website: worldpokertour.com

The World Poker Tour (WPT) is an internationally televised gaming and entertainment brand. Since 2002, the World Poker Tour has operated a series of international poker tournaments and associated television series broadcasting playdown and the final table of each tournament.

The most prominent of World Poker Tour events belong to the WPT Main Tour. The WPT Main Tour focuses on the buy-in range of $3,500–$25,000, and winners of official WPT Main Tour events are awarded a membership to the WPT Champions Club. The WPT Champions Cup is the trophy awarded to all winners of WPT Main Tour events, and champions have their names engraved on the Cup.

== History ==
The World Poker Tour was started in 2002 in the United States by attorney/television producer Steven Lipscomb, who served as CEO of WPT Enterprises, Inc. (WPTE).

Winners on the World Poker Tour are awarded a bracelet, inspired by a similar bracelet by the World Series of Poker (WSOP). While the champions of the first six seasons did not initially receive bracelets, they were awarded them at a special event at the Bellagio in Las Vegas on April 21, 2008. The bracelets are crafted from titanium and diamond by Tiffany and Company.

In November 2009, PartyGaming announced its acquisition of the World Poker Tour for $12.3 million. In 2011, PartyGaming merged with bwin to form bwin.Party Digital Entertainment.

In December 2014, World Poker Tour announced an alliance with Ourgame, agreeing to license products and services on an exclusive basis in more than a dozen countries across Asia. In addition, Ourgame received the rights to use the WPT logo and trademark exclusively in Bhutan, Cambodia, China, Hong Kong, Indonesia, Laos, Korea, Nepal, Macau, Malaysia, Taiwan, Thailand, Philippines, and Vietnam and operate on pokermonster.com.

In June 2015, The World Poker Tour (WPT) announced that bwin.party sold the company to Ourgame International Holdings Ltd. for a price of $35 million in cash.

In 2021 the World Poker Tour was sold to Element Partners for $105 million.

=== Sherman Act lawsuit ===
In July 2006, seven poker professionals sued WPTE, alleging violations of the Sherman Antitrust Act, the California Cartwright Act, and intentional interference with contract. The professionals (Chris Ferguson, Andy Bloch, Annie Duke, Joe Hachem, Phil Gordon, Howard Lederer, and Greg Raymer) alleged that WPTE's standard release forms, required for participation in WPTE events, were anti-competitive and designed to interfere with their contractual obligations to other companies. The anti-competition claim was based on the fact that WPTE's contracts with the casinos that host its tournaments barred those casinos (and other casinos owned by the same parent companies) from hosting non-WPTE poker events. The claim of interference with contract was based on the releases' claim to perpetual rights to the players' likenesses for any use WPTE wished. The players claimed that this would put them in violation of other contracts (such as Ferguson's Activision Games contract or several players' contracts with online poker sites).

Hachem and Raymer dropped out of the lawsuit before its eventual settlement.

In April 2008, WPT Enterprises, Inc. settled with the five players remaining in the lawsuit. Chris Ferguson said about the settlement, "We are happy to have come to an agreement that is fair to all players, and to have put in place a new release that clears up ambiguities in how players' images may be used. We are especially happy that this new release will apply to all poker players who wish to participate in WPT tournaments and events."

== Television ==
The year-round WPT television show has broadcast globally in more than 150 countries and territories, and is producing its 24th season (2026), which airs on FanDuel Sports Network in the United States. In August 2016, the World Poker Tour and Fox Sports (now FanDuel Sports Network) announced a five-year deal to see Fox Sports broadcast the WPT through Season 19.

The WPT television show currently features commentary and analysis by Tony Dunst and Vince Van Patten. Dunst joined the World Poker Tour as host of the WPT Raw Deal during Season 9 after winning the role through an open casting competition. Following the retirement of Mike Sexton from the WPT commentary booth after 15 years, Dunst was elevated into the role alongside Van Patten.

Joining Dunst and Van Patten for all WPT televised broadcasts is anchor Lynn Gilmartin. Gilmartin's role focuses on hosting and presenting the show, as well as offering intimate interviews and sideline reporting. Gilmartin assumed the anchor role for Season 12 and remains the current anchor.

Prior to Gilmartin, Shana Hiatt served as the show host and sideline reporter in its first three seasons. Courtney Friel took over the host role for the fourth season, and Sabina Gadecki for the fifth. Layla Kayleigh and Kimberly Lansing began serving as hostesses in Season VI. Poker player and reporter Amanda Leatherman was the host for Season VII while Lansing was on maternity leave. Lansing returned as the anchor for Season 9 through 11.

The first season aired on the Travel Channel on American cable television in the spring of 2003. The show made its network debut on February 1, 2004, on NBC with a special "Battle of Champions" tournament, which aired against CBS coverage of the Super Bowl XXXVIII pre-game show. The Travel Channel aired the first five seasons of the Tour. In April 2007, WPTE announced that the series would move to GSN for its sixth season in the spring of 2008. 'The first WPT tournament to air on GSN, the Mirage Poker Showdown, debuted on March 24, 2008. In July 2008, WPTE announced that the series would move to Fox Sports Regional Networks for its seventh season.

Following the November 2009 acquisition of the World Poker Tour by PartyGaming plc, the new owners added a second series of televised WPT events under their PartyPoker brand name. This series has, to date, focused on televising the European stops of the WPT. Mike Sexton continues to provide commentary, though he is partnered with Denmark-based American commentator Jesse May rather than Vince Van Patten. The role of female show host and sideline reporter has been served by a number of personalities, often from the country where the event is held. One exception is Canadian born poker player Kara Scott, who has served as host for a number of the PartyPoker branded telecasts of these European WPT events.

The show's hosts, Tony Dunst and Vince Van Patten, sit at a booth near the final table, providing commentary and occasionally interacting with the players during the game. However, their specific comments about hole cards are recorded after the tournament takes place because gaming regulations prohibit them from observing a live feed of the "hole card cameras" while on the set. These cameras, built into the table, allow viewers to see the face-down hole cards dealt to each player.

In 2014, the World Poker Tour launched a high roller tournament series, WPT Alpha8, broadcasting on Fox Sports 1. The series originally featured commentary and analysis by Ali Nejad and Olivier Busquet, with Gilmartin serving as anchor. In later seasons, Vince Van Patten and Tony Dunst replaced Nejad and Busquet, while Lynn Gilmartin continued to serve as anchor.

The first three seasons of WPT are available on NTSC DVD.

In February 2019, WPT announced a deal with BT Sport to broadcast season XV of WPT. The deal expands WPT coverage to the UK and Ireland. During season XV, former WPT television commentator Mike Sexton won his first WPT event.

In March 2019, WPT announced a deal with TV Azteca to bring WPT assets to Latin America.

== Other Tours ==
=== Professional Poker Tour ===
A series of spin-off tournaments, titled the Professional Poker Tour, began filming in 2004. Broadcast of the series was delayed, which was partly due to a dispute with the Travel Channel over rights. In the fall of 2005, WPTE announced that "a cable channel" (believed to be ESPN) had withdrawn from bidding for the PPT series, and that WPTE was negotiating with the Travel Channel to air the series. On January 30, 2006, WPTE and the Travel Channel announced that they had dismissed all open lawsuits. The series began regular broadcast July 5, 2006, but was suspended after one season as WPTE couldn't find a television home for a second season.

=== ClubWPT ===
In 2008, the WPT launched a new product called ClubWPT. It is a subscription-based club where members can pay a monthly fee to play in tournaments that award over $100,000 in cash and prizes each month.

=== PlayWPT ===
In 2016, WPT launched a new social casino platform called PlayWPT, offering poker and slots.

With PlayWPT Poker, players can participate in ring games, tournaments, and sit-n-gos, and players can represent themselves at the table with avatars animated emojis. PlayWPT is available on desktop and mobile.

== WPT Player of the Year ==
While the winner of the season-ending WPT World Championship (simply the WPT Championship before season 9) is deemed that season's WPT Champion, the WPT also determines a Player of the Year to recognize the player who achieves consistent high finishes in WPT events throughout the entire season.

The Player of the Year is determined by a points system, with the player who earns the most points each season being named the WPT Player of the Year. The season-ending WPT World Championship is a points-earning event for the Player of the Year calculation.

Through the end of Season 9, no player has been named WPT Player of the Year and also captured the WPT Championship. The closest to date is Season 7 WPT Player of the Year Bertrand Grospellier, who finished 3rd in that season's WPT Championship.

In the first eight seasons of the World Poker Tour, only four players have finished in the money at least once. These players are Phil Hellmuth, Erik Seidel, Mark Seif, and Surinder Sunar.

Season	Years	WPT Player of the Year	Wins
1	2002–2003	(United States) Howard Lederer	2
2	2003–2004	(United States) Erick Lindgren	2
3	2004–2005	(Canada) Daniel Negreanu	2
4	2005–2006	(Canada) Gavin Smith	1
5	2006–2007	(Vietnam) J. C. Tran	1
6	2007–2008	(United States) Jonathan Little	1
7	2008–2009	(France) Bertrand Grospellier	1
8	2009–2010	(United States) Faraz Jaka	0
9	2010–2011	(United States) Andy Frankenberger	1
10	2011–2012	(United States) Joe Serock	0
11	2012–2013	(Canada) Matthew Salsberg	1
12	2013–2014	(United States) Mukul Pahuja	0
13	2014–2015	(United States) Anthony Zinno	2
14	2015–2016	(United States) Mike Shariati	1
15	2016–2017	(United States) Benjamin Zamani	0
16	2017–2018	(United States) Art Papazyan	2
17	2018–2019	(United States) Erkut Yilmaz	2
18	2019–2021	(United States) Brian Altman	1
19	2021	(United States) Jake Ferro	1
20	2022	(United States) Chad Eveslage	1
21	2023	(United States) Bin Weng	2
22	2024	(United States) Yunkyu Song	0
23	2025	(United States) Harvey Castro	1

=== Points system ===
During the first 8 seasons, only the 6 players at the final table in each Open event, plus the last (7th) player eliminated before the final table, earned points as follows:

- Winner: 1,000 points
- Runner-up: 700 points
- 3rd place: 600 points
- 4th place: 500 points
- 5th place: 400 points
- 6th place: 300 points
- 7th place: 200 points (television final table bubble)

Starting with season 9, the points system was adjusted to recognize the number of entries and the size of the prize pool for each event:

- Generally, 10% of the participants in each event will finish in the money (ITM), so the system now gives Player of the Year points to all ITM players.
- The maximum number of points awarded to the event winner are now scaled to the size of the prize pool, with 600 points to the winner of an event with a prize pool smaller than $500,000 and 1400 points to the winner of an event with a prize pool larger than $4,000,000. The season-ending WPT World Championship, no matter the prize pool, also starts at 1400 points to the winner.
- The system still operates on a descending scale, though the scale provides a minimum of 50 points to all the 'bottom' ITM players in any event.

== WPT Main Event winners ==
PokerStars Caribbean Adventure Main Event winner.
Winner of poker's Triple Crown.

Season	Years	Date	Event	Location	Main event winner	Prize
1	2002–2003	27 May–1 June 2002	Five Diamond World Poker Classic	(United States) Bellagio, Las Vegas	(Denmark) Gus Hansen	$556,460
1	2002–2003	30–31 August 2002	Legends of Poker	(United States) The Bicycle Hotel & Casino, Bell Gardens, California	(Lebanon) Chris Karagulleyan	$258,000
1	2002–2003	9 October 2002	Ultimate Poker Classic	Radisson Aruba Resort & Casino, Palm Beach	(Finland) Juha Helppi	$50.000
1	2002–2003	19 October 2002	Costa Rica Classic	(Costa Rica) Casinos Europa, San José	(Costa Rica) Jose Rosenkrantz	$108,730
1	2002–2003	10–11 November 2002	Gold Rush	(United States) Lucky Chances Casino, Colma	(United States) Paul Darden	$146,000
1	2002–2003	14–17 November 2002	World Poker Finals	(United States) Foxwoods Resort Casino, Mashantucket	(United States) Howard Lederer	$320,400
1	2002–2003	28–31 January 2003	World Poker Open	(United States) Binion's Horseshoe, Tunica	(United Kingdom) Dave Ulliott	$589,175
1	2002–2003	12–15 February 2003	Euro Finals of Poker	Aviation Club de France, Paris	(Sweden) Christer Johansson	$538,213 (€500,000)
1	2002–2003	21–24 February 2003	L.A. Poker Classic	(United States) Commerce Casino, Los Angeles	(Denmark) Gus Hansen (2)	$532,490
1	2002–2003	6 March 2003	PartyPoker Million II	Card Player Cruises	(United States) Howard Lederer (2)	$289,150
1	2002–2003	31 March–2 April 2003	World Poker Challenge	(United States) Reno Hilton, Reno	(United States) Ron Rose	$168,298
1	2002–2003	14–18 April 2003	WPT Championship	(United States) Bellagio, Las Vegas	(United States) Alan Goehring	$1,011,886
2	2003–2004	10–13 July 2003	Grand Prix de Paris	Aviation Club de France, Paris	(France) David Benyamine	$410,886 (€357,200)
2	2003–2004	1–3 September 2003	Legends of Poker	(United States) The Bicycle Hotel & Casino, Bell Gardens, California	(Australia) Mel Judah	$579,375
2	2003–2004	20–22 September 2003	Borgata Poker Open	(United States) Borgata, Atlantic City	(Philippines) Noli Francisco	$470,000
2	2003–2004	18 October 2003	Ultimate Poker Classic	Radisson Aruba Resort & Casino, Palm Beach	(United States) Erick Lindgren	$500,000
2	2003–2004	14–17 November 2003	World Poker Finals	(United States) Foxwoods Resort Casino, Mashantucket	(United States) Hoyt Corkins	$1,089,200
2	2003–2004	15–18 December 2003	Five Diamond World Poker Classic	(United States) Bellagio, Las Vegas	(United States) Paul Phillips	$1,101,908
2	2003–2004	25 January 2004	PokerStars Caribbean Adventure	(The Bahamas) Royal Caribbean Voyager of the Seas	(Denmark) Gus Hansen (3)	$455,780
2	2003–2004	26–29 January 2004	World Poker Open	(United States) Horseshoe Casino & Hotel, Tunica	(United States) Barry Greenstein	$1,278,370
2	2003–2004	21–24 February 2004	L.A. Poker Classic	(United States) Commerce Casino, Los Angeles	(United States) Antonio Esfandiari	$1,399,135
2	2003–2004	3–5 March 2004	Bay 101 Shooting Star	(United States) Bay 101, San José	(United States) Phil Gordon	$360,000
2	2003–2004	18 March 2004	PartyPoker Million III	Card Player Cruises	(United States) Erick Lindgren (2)	$1,000,000
2	2003–2004	30 March–1 April 2004	World Poker Challenge	(United States) Reno Hilton, Reno	(United States) Mike Kinney	$629,469
2	2003–2004	19–23 April 2004	WPT Championship	(United States) Bellagio, Las Vegas	(Sweden) Martin de Knijff	$2,728,356
3	2004–2005	17-20 July 2004	Grand Prix De Paris	Aviation Club de France, Paris	(United Kingdom) Surinder Sunar	$828,956 (€679,860)
3	2004–2005	29 July-1 August 2004	Mirage Poker Showdown	(United States) The Mirage, Las Vegas	(Israel) Eli Elezra	$1,024,574
3	2004–2005	28-31 August 2004	Legends of Poker	(United States) The Bicycle Hotel & Casino, Bell Gardens, California	(United States) Doyle Brunson	$1,198,260
3	2004–2005	19-22 September 2004	Borgata Poker Open	(United States) Borgata, Atlantic City	(Canada) Daniel Negreanu	$1,117,400
3	2004–2005	26 September-1 October 2004	Aruba Poker Classic	Radisson Aruba Resort & Casino, Palm Beach	(Costa Rica) Eric Brenes	$1,000,000
3	2004–2005	19-22 October 2004	Doyle Brunson North American Poker Championship	(United States) Bellagio, Las Vegas	(Ecuador) Carlos Mortensen	$1,000,000
3	2004–2005	13-17 November 2004	Foxwood World Poker Finals	(United States) Foxwoods Resort Casino, Mashantucket	(Vietnam) Tuan Le	$1,549,588
3	2004–2005	14-18 December 2004	Five Diamond Poker Classic	(United States) Bellagio, Las Vegas	(Canada) Daniel Negreanu (2)	$1,770,218
3	2004–2005	5-12 January 2005	PokerStars Caribbean Adventure	(The Bahamas) Atlantis Casino and Resort, Paradise Island	(United Kingdom) John Gale	$890,000
3	2004–2005	24-27 January 2005	World Poker Open	(United States) Horseshoe Casino & Hotel, Tunica	(United States) Johnny Stolzmann	$1,491,444
3	2004–2005	18-22 February 2005	L.A. Poker Classic	(United States) Commerce Casino, Los Angeles	(United States) Michael Mizrachi	$1,859,909
3	2004–2005	23-24 February 2005	WPT Celebrity Invitational	(United States) Commerce Casino, Los Angeles	(Costa Rica) Alex Brenes	$100,000
3	2004–2005	7-11 March 2005	Bay 101 Shooting Star	(United States) Bay 101, San José	(Vietnam) Danny Nguyen	$1,025,000
3	2004–2005	19-24 March 2005	Cruisin' Mexico with PartyPoker Million IV	MS Oosterdam - Holland America Line	(Poland) Michael Gracz	$1,525,500
3	2004–2005	29 March-1 April 2005	World Poker Challenge	(United States) Reno Hilton, Reno	(United States) Arnold Spee	$633,880
3	2004–2005	18-24 April 2005	World Championship	(United States) Bellagio, Las Vegas	(Vietnam) Tuan Le (2)	$2,856,150
4	2005–2006	23-26 May 2005	Mirage Poker Showdown	(United States) The Mirage, Las Vegas	(Canada) Gavin Smith	$1,153,778
4	2005–2006	25-29 July 2005	Grand Prix De Paris	Aviation Club de France, Paris	(United Kingdom) Roland De Wolfe	$574,419 (€479,680)
4	2005–2006	27-31 August 2005	The Bicycle Casino Legends of Poker	(United States) The Bicycle Hotel & Casino, Bell Gardens, California	(Israel) Alex Kahaner	$1,150,900
4	2005–2006	19-22 September 2005	Borgata Poker Open	(United States) Borgata, Atlantic City	(United States) Al Ardebili	$1,498,650
4	2005–2006	26 September-3 October 2005	Aruba Poker Classic	Radisson Aruba Resort & Casino, Palm Beach	(Lebanon) Freddy Deeb	$1,000,000
4	2005–2006	18-21 October 2005	Doyle Brunson North American Poker Championship	(United States) Bellagio, Las Vegas	(Vietnam) Minh Ly	$1,060,050
4	2005–2006	13-18 November 2005	World Poker Finals	(United States) Foxwoods Resort Casino, Mashantucket	(United States) Nick Schulman	$2,167,500
4	2005–2006	12-16 December 2005	Five Diamond Poker Classic	(United States) Bellagio, Las Vegas	(Denmark) Rehne Pedersen	$2,078,185
4	2005–2006	5-10 January 2006	PokerStars Caribbean Adventure	(The Bahamas) Atlantis Casino and Resort, Paradise Island	(Canada) Steve Paul-Ambrose	$1,388,600
4	2005–2006	19-23 January 2006	World Poker Open	(United States) Horseshoe Casino & Hotel, Tunica	(Vietnam) Scotty Nguyen	$969,421
4	2005–2006	29 January-1 February 2006	Borgata Poker Classic	(United States) Borgata, Atlantic City	(United States) Michael Mizrachi (2)	$1,173,373
4	2005–2006	16-21 February 2006	L.A. Poker Classic	(United States) Commerce Casino, Los Angeles	(United States) Alan Goehring (2)	$2,391,550
4	2005–2006	22-24 February 2006	WPT Celebrity Invitational	(United States) Commerce Casino, Los Angeles	(United States) Barry Greenstein (2)	$100,000
4	2005–2006	10-14 March 2006	Bay 101 Shooting Star	(United States) Bay 101, San José	(United States) Nam Le	$1,198,300
4	2005–2006	27-30 March 2006	World Poker Challenge	(United States) Reno Hilton, Reno	(United States) Mike Simon	$1,052,890
4	2005–2006	6-9 April 2006	Foxwoods Poker Classic	(United States) Foxwoods Resort Casino, Mashantucket	(Guyana) Victor Ramdin	$1,331,889
4	2005–2006	18-24 April 2006	World Championship	(United States) Bellagio, Las Vegas	(United States) Joe Bartholdi Jr.	$3,760,165
5	2006–2007	14-17 May 2006	Mirage Poker Showdown	(United States) The Mirage, Las Vegas	(United States) Stanley Weiss	$1,320,255
5	2006–2007	4-8 June 2006	Mandalay Bay Poker Championship	(United States) Mandalay Bay Resort and Casino	(United States) Joseph Tehan	$1,033,440
5	2006–2007	12-16 June 2006	Grand Prix De Paris	Aviation Club de France, Paris	(Denmark) Christian Grundtvig	$907,066 (€712,500)
5	2006–2007	26-30 August 2006	Bicycle Casino Legends of Poker	(United States) The Bicycle Hotel & Casino, Bell Gardens, California	(United States) Joe Pelton	$1,602,670
5	2006–2007	15-19 September 2006	Borgata Poker Open	(United States) Borgata, Atlantic City	(United States) Mark Newhouse	$1,519,020
5	2006–2007	16-20 October 2006	Festa Al Lago	(United States) Bellagio, Las Vegas	(Norway) Andreas Walnum	$1,090,025
5	2006–2007	22-30 October 2006	Canadian Poker Open	(Canada) Fallsview Casino Resort	(United States) Scott Clements	$222,524 (C$250,027)
5	2006–2007	25-29 October 2006	North American Poker Championship	(Canada) Fallsview Casino Resort	(Canada) Soren Turkewitsch	$1,225,920 (C$1,380,378)
5	2006–2007	12-16 November 2006	World Poker Finals	(United States) Foxwoods Resort Casino	(Serbia) Nenad Medić	$1,717,194
5	2006–2007	14-19 December 2006	Bellagio Five Diamond World Poker Classic	(United States) Bellagio, Las Vegas	(Australia) Joe Hachem	$2,207,575
5	2006–2007	5-10 January 2007	PokerStars Caribbean Adventure	(The Bahamas) Atlantis Casino and Resort, Paradise Island	(United States) Ryan Daut	$1,535,255
5	2006–2007	21-25 January 2007	World Poker Open	(United States) Binion's Horseshoe, Tunica	(United States) Bryan Sumner	$913,986
5	2006–2007	26-30 January 2007	Borgata Poker Classic	(United States) Borgata, Atlantic City	(United States) John Hennigan	$1,606,223
5	2006–2007	24 February-1 March 2007	L.A. Poker Classic	(United States) Commerce Casino, Los Angeles	(United States) Eric Hershler	$2,429,970
5	2006–2007	3-5 March 2007	WPT Celebrity Invitational	(United States) Commerce Casino, Los Angeles	(United States) Adam Weinraub	$125,000
5	2006–2007	12-16 March 2007	Bay 101 Shooting Star	(United States) Bay 101, San José	(United States) Ted Forrest	$1,100,000
5	2006–2007	25-28 March 2007	World Poker Challenge	(United States) Grand Sierra Resort, Reno, Nevada	(Vietnam) J. C. Tran	$683,473
5	2006–2007	30 March-4 April 2007	Foxwoods Poker Classic	(United States) Foxwoods Resort Casino, Ledyard, Connecticut	(United States) Raj Patel	$1,298,405
5	2006–2007	21-27 April 2007	WPT World Championship	(United States) Bellagio Resort & Casino, Las Vegas	(Ecuador) Carlos Mortensen (2)	$3,970,415
6	2007–2008	19-23 May 2007	WPT Mirage Poker Showdown	(United States) The Mirage, Las Vegas	(United States) Jonathan Little	$1,091,295
6	2007–2008	29 May-2 June 2007	Mandalay Bay Poker Championship	(United States) Mandalay Bay Resort & Casino, Las Vegas	(Canada) Shawn Buchanan	$768,775
6	2007–2008	10-15 July 2007	Bellagio Cup III	(United States) Bellagio, Las Vegas	(United States) Kevin Saul	$1,342,320
6	2007–2008	25-30 August 2007	WPT Legends of Poker	(United States) The Bicycle Hotel & Casino, Bell Gardens, California	(United States) Dan Harrington	$1,599,865
6	2007–2008	6-9 September 2007	Gulf Coast Poker Championship	(United States) Beau Rivage Resort & Casino in Biloxi, Mississippi	(United States) William Edler	$747,615
6	2007–2008	16-20 September 2007	WPT Borgata Poker Open	(United States) Borgata Hotel Casino & Spa, Atlantic City, New Jersey	(United States) Roy Winston	$1,575,280
6	2007–2008	25-30 September 2007	WPT Turks & Caicos Poker Classic	The Players Club, Turks and Caicos Islands	(Turks and Caicos Islands) Rhynie Campbell	$436,675
6	2007–2008	11-16 October 2007	WPT Spanish Championship	Casino Barcelona, Barcelona Spain	(Germany) Markus Lehmann	$789,592 (€537,000)
6	2007–2008	26 October-2 November 2007	North American Poker Championships	(Canada) Niagara Fallsview Casino Resort, Niagara Falls, Ontario	(United States) Scott Clements (2)	$1,505,312 (C$1,456,585)
6	2007–2008	7-13 November 2007	WPT Foxwoods World Poker Finals	(United States) Foxwoods Resort Casino, Ledyard, Connecticut	(United States) Michael Vela	$1,704,986
6	2007–2008	12-18 December 2007	Doyle Brunson Five Diamond World Poker Classic	(United States) Bellagio, Las Vegas	(Ukraine) Eugene Katchalov	$2,482,605
6	2007–2008	20-24 January 2008	World Poker Open	(United States) Gold Strike Casino & Resort, Tunica County, Mississippi	(United States) Brett Faustman	$892,413
6	2007–2008	27-31 January 2008	WPT Borgata Poker Classic	(United States) Borgata Hotel Casino & Spa, Atlantic City, New Jersey	(United States) Gavin Griffin	$1,401,109
6	2007–2008	23-28 February 2008	WPT L.A. Poker Classic	(United States) Commerce Casino, Los Angeles	(United States) Phil Ivey	$1,596,100
6	2007–2008	1-3 March 2008	WPT Celebrity Invitational	(United States) Commerce Casino, Los Angeles	(United States) Van Tuyet Nguyen	$125,500
6	2007–2008	10-14 March 2008	Bay 101 Shooting Star	(United States) Bay 101, San Jose, California	(United States) Brandon Cantu	$1,000,000
6	2007–2008	25-28 March 2008	World Poker Challenge	(United States) Grand Sierra Resort, Reno, Nevada	(United States) Lee Markholt	$493,815
6	2007–2008	4-9 April 2008	Foxwoods Poker Classic	(United States) Foxwoods Resort Casino, Ledyard, Connecticut	(United States) Erik Seidel	$992,890
6	2007–2008	19-26 April 2008	WPT World Championship	(United States) Bellagio, Las Vegas	(China) David Chiu	$3,389,140
7	2008–2009	23-27 May 2008	WPT Spanish Championship 2008	Casino Barcelona, Barcelona Spain	(Denmark) Casper Hansen	$662,592 (€425,000)
7	2008–2009	11-17 July 2008	WPT Bellagio Cup IV	(United States) Bellagio, Las Vegas	(Canada) Mike Watson	$1,673,770
7	2008–2009	23-28 August 2008	WPT Legends of Poker	(United States) The Bicycle Hotel & Casino, Bell Gardens, California	(Vietnam) John Phan	$1,116,428
7	2008–2009	14-18 September 2008	WPT Borgata Poker Open	(United States) Borgata Hotel Casino & Spa, Atlantic City, New Jersey	(India) Vivek Rajkumar	$1,424,500
7	2008–2009	10-16 October 2008	North American Poker Championships	(Canada) Niagara Fallsview Casino Resort, Niagara Falls, Ontario	(Canada) Glen Witmer	$1,084,256 (C$1,224,852)
7	2008–2009	20-25 October 2008	WPT Festa al Lago	(United States) Bellagio, Las Vegas	(France) Bertrand Grospellier	$1,411,015
7	2008–2009	5-11 November 2008	WPT Foxwoods World Poker Finals	(United States) Foxwoods Resort Casino, Ledyard, Connecticut	(United States) Jonathan Little (2)	$1,120,310
7	2008–2009	13-19 December 2008	Doyle Brunson Five Diamond World Poker Classic	(United States) Bellagio, Las Vegas	(United States) David Rheem	$1,538,730
7	2008–2009	14-17 January 2009	WPT Southern Poker Championship	(United States) Beau Rivage Resort & Casino in Biloxi, Mississippi	(United States) Allen Carter	$1,025,500
7	2008–2009	21-26 February 2009	WPT L.A. Poker Classic	(United States) Commerce Casino, Los Angeles	(United States) Cornel Andrew Cimpan	$1,686,760
7	2008–2009	28 February-2 March 2009	WPT Celebrity Invitational	(United States) Commerce Casino, Los Angeles	(Lebanon) Freddy Deeb (2)	$100,000
7	2008–2009	16-20 March 2009	WPT Bay 101 Shooting Star	(United States) Bay 101, San Jose, California	(United States) Steve Brecher	$1,025,500
7	2008–2009	3-8 April 2009	WPT Foxwoods Poker Classic	(United States) Foxwoods Resort Casino, Ledyard, Connecticut	(United States) Vadim Trincher	$731,079
7	2008–2009	18-25 April 2009	WPT World Championship	(United States) Bellagio, Las Vegas	(Ukraine) Yevgeniy Timoshenko	$2,143,655
8	2009–2010	6-10 May 2009	WPT Venice	Casino Di Venezia, Venice, Italy	(Sweden) Sven-Ragnar Arstrom	$532,388
8	2009–2010	26-30 June 2009	WPT Spanish Championship 2008	Casino Barcelona, Barcelona Spain	(United States) Mark Flowers Jr	$386,170 (€277,0000
8	2009–2010	13-19 July 2009	WPT Bellagio Cup V	(United States) Bellagio, Las Vegas	(Brazil) Alexandre Gomes	$1,187,670
8	2009–2010	22-26 August 2009	WPT Legends of Poker	(United States) The Bicycle Hotel & Casino, Bell Gardens, California	(United States) Prahlad Friedman	$1,009,000
8	2009–2010	31 August-4 September 2009	WPT Slovakia	Golden Vegas, Bratislava, Slovakia	(Hungary) Richard Toth	$148,756 (€104,000)
8	2009–2010	6-12 September 2009	WPT Merit Cyprus Classic	Merit Crystal Cove Hotel-Casino, Kyrenia, Cyprus	(France) Thomas Bichon	$579,165
8	2009–2010	19-24 September 2009	WPT Borgata Poker Open	(United States) Borgata Hotel Casino & Spa, Atlantic City, New Jersey	(United States) Olivier Busquet	$925,514
8	2009–2010	16-18 October 2009	WPT Marrakech	Casino de Marrakesh, Marrakesh, Morocco	(France) Christophe Savary	$558,515 (€379,014)
8	2009–2010	21-26 October 2009	WPT Festa al Lago	(United States) Bellagio, Las Vegas	(United States) Tommy Vedes	$1,218,225
8	2009–2010	5-10 November 2009	WPT Foxwoods World Poker Finals	(United States) Foxwoods Resort Casino, Ledyard, Connecticut	(United States) Cornel Andrew Cimpan (2)	$910,058
8	2009–2010	14-19 December 2009	Doyle Brunson Five Diamond World Poker Classic	(United States) Bellagio, Las Vegas	(United States) Daniel Alaei	$1,428,430
8	2009–2010	24-27 January 2010	WPT Southern Poker Championship	(United States) Beau Rivage Resort & Casino in Biloxi, Mississippi	(United States) Hoyt Corkins (2)	$739,486
8	2009–2010	20 February 2010	WPT Celebrity Invitational	(United States) Commerce Casino, Los Angeles	(United States) Leron Washington	$100,000
8	2009–2010	26 February-4 March 2010	WPT L.A. Poker Classic	(United States) Commerce Casino, Los Angeles	(Hungary) Andras Koroknai	$1,788,001
8	2009–2010	8-12 March 2010	WPT Bay 101 Shooting Star	(United States) Bay 101, San Jose, California	(United States) McLean Karr	$878,500
8	2009–2010	20-24 March 2010	WPT Hollywood Poker Open	(United States) Hollywood Casino, Lawrenceburg, Indiana	(Ecuador) Carlos Mortensen (3)	$391,212
8	2009–2010	27 March-2 April 2010	WPT Bucharest	Regent Casino, Bucharest, Romania	(France) Guillaume Darcourt	$193,387 (€144,530)
8	2009–2010	18-24 April 2010	WPT World Championship	(United States) Bellagio, Las Vegas	(United States) David Williams	$1,530,537
9	2010–2011	8-15 May 2010	WPT Grand Prix de Paris	Aviation Club de France, Paris, France	(Denmark) Theo Jørgensen	$848,736 (€638,377)
9	2010–2011	19-23 May 2010	WPT Spanish Championship 2010	Casino Barcelona, Barcelona Spain	(Germany) Ali Tekintamgac	$343,307 (€278,000)
9	2010–2011	11-15 July 2010	WPT Bellagio Cup VI	(United States) Bellagio, Las Vegas	(Germany) Moritz Kranich	$875,150
9	2010–2011	20-25 August 2010	WPT Legends of Poker	(United States) The Bicycle Hotel & Casino, Bell Gardens, California	(United States) Andy Frankenberger	$750,000
9	2010–2011	30 August-4 September 2010	WPT London	(United Kingdom) Palm Beach Casino, London, UK	(United Kingdom) Jake Cody	$425,492 (£273,783)
9	2010–2011	18-23 September 2010	WPT Borgata Poker Open	(United States) Borgata Hotel Casino & Spa, Atlantic City, New Jersey	(United States) Dwyte Pilgrim	$733,802
9	2010–2011	15-20 October 2010	WPT Festa al Lago	(United States) Bellagio, Las Vegas	(United States) Mark Flowers Jr (2)	$831,500
9	2010–2011	28 October-2 November 2010	WPT Foxwoods World Poker Finals	(United States) Foxwoods Resort Casino, Ledyard, Connecticut	(United States) Jeff Forrest	$548,752
9	2010–2011	2-6 November 2010	WPT Amneville	Casino Tranchant Seven, Amnéville, France	(Switzerland) Sam El Sayed	$594,627 (€426,425)
9	2010–2011	27-30 November 2010	WPT Marrakech	Casino de Marrakesh, Marrakesh, Morocco	(Germany) Sébastian Homann	$341,798 (€250,196)
9	2010–2011	3-8 December 2010	Doyle Brunson Five Diamond World Poker Classic	(United States) Bellagio, Las Vegas	(United States) Antonio Esfandiari (2)	$870,124
9	2010–2011	23-27 January 2011	WPT Southern Poker Championship	(United States) Beau Rivage Resort & Casino in Biloxi, Mississippi	(Russia) Alexander Kuzmin	$575,969
9	2010–2011	3-8 February 2011	WPT Venice	Casino Di Venezia, Venice, Italy	(Italy) Alessio Isaia	$518,382 (€380,000)
9	2010–2011	19-20 February 2011	WPT Celebrity Invitational	(United States) Commerce Casino, Los Angeles	(Belgium) Davidi Kitai	$100,000
9	2010–2011	25 February-3 March 2011	WPT L.A. Poker Classic	(United States) Commerce Casino, Los Angeles	(United States) Gregory Brooks	$1,654,120
9	2010–2011	14-18 March 2011	WPT Bay 101 Shooting Star	(United States) Bay 101, San Jose, California	(United States) Alan Sternberg	$1,039,000
9	2010–2011	25-29 March 2011	WPT Vienna	Montesino Wien, Vienna, Austria	(Russia) Dmitry Gromov	$636,733 (€447,840)
9	2010–2011	30 March-3 April 2011	WPT Slovakia	Golden Vegas, Bratislava, Slovakia	(United Kingdom) Roberto Romanello	$197,861 (€140,685)
9	2010–2011	9-13 April 2011	WPT Hollywood Poker Open	(United States) Hollywood Casino, Lawrenceburg, Indiana	(United States) Michael Scarborough	$273,664
9	2010–2011	27 April-2 May 2011	WPT Seminole Hard Rock Poker Showdown	(United States) Seminole Hard Rock Hotel & Casino, Hollywood, Florida	(United States) Taylor von Kriegenbergh	$1,122,340
9	2010–2011	14-20 May 2011	WPT World Championship	(United States) Bellagio, Las Vegas	(United States) Scott Seiver	$1,618,344
10	2011–2012	25-29 May 2011	WPT Spanish Championship 2010	Casino Barcelona, Barcelona Spain	(Sweden) Lukas Berglund	$327,546 (€231,500)
10	2011–2012	17-21 July 2011	WPT Slovenia	Grand Casino Portorož, Slovenia	(Slovenia) Miha Travnik	$144,399 (€102,623)
10	2011–2012	25-30 August 2011	WPT Legends of Poker	(United States) The Bicycle Hotel & Casino, Bell Gardens, California	(United States) Will Failla	$758,085
10	2011–2012	5-10 September 2011	WPT Grand Prix de Paris	Aviation Club de France, Paris, France	(United States) Matthew Waxman	$721,178 (€500,000)
10	2011–2012	18-23 September 2011	WPT Borgata Poker Open	(United States) Borgata Hotel Casino & Spa, Atlantic City, New Jersey	(United States) Bobby Oboodi	$922,441
10	2011–2012	20-24 September 2011	WPT Malta	Portomaso#Portomaso Casino, St. Julian's, Malta	(United States) Matt Giannetti	$276,457 (€200,000)
10	2011–2012	27 October-1 November 2011	WPT Foxwoods World Poker Finals	(United States) Foxwoods Resort Casino, Ledyard, Connecticut	(United States) Daniel Santoro	$449,910
10	2011–2012	1-6 November 2011	WPT Amneville	Casino Tranchant Seven, Amnéville, France	(France) Adrien Allain	$471,025 (€336,133)
10	2011–2012	18-22 November 2011	WPT Jacksonville	(United States) BestBet Poker Room Jacksonville, Florida	(United States) Anthony Ruberto	$325,928
10	2011–2012	24-27 November 2011	WPT Marrakech	Casino de Marrakesh, Marrakesh, Morocco	(Morocco) Mohamed Ali Houssam	$214,983 (€159,150)
10	2011–2012	1-5 December 2011	WPT Prague	King's Casino, Prague, Czech Republic	(Russia) Andrey Pateychuk	$599,720 (€450,000)
10	2011–2012	6-10 December 2011	Doyle Brunson Five Diamond World Poker Classic	(United States) Bellagio, Las Vegas	(United Kingdom) James Dempsey	$821,612
10	2011–2012	13-18 December 2011	WPT Venice	Casino Di Venezia, Venice, Italy	(Italy) Edoardo Alescio	$234,597 (€175,000)
10	2011–2012	5-8 January 2012	WPT Dublin	(Republic of Ireland) Citywest Hotel, Dublin, Ireland	(United Kingdom) David Shallow	$289,032 (€222,280)
10	2011–2012	6-10 February 2012	WPT Venice Grand Prix	Casino Di Venezia, Venice, Italy	(Russia) Rinat Bogdanov	$301,939 (€229,800)
10	2011–2012	10-14 February 2012	Seminole Hard Rock Lucky Hearts Poker Open	(United States) Seminole Hard Rock Hotel & Casino, Hollywood, Florida	(United States) Matt Juttelstad	$268,444
10	2011–2012	24-29 February 2012	WPT L.A. Poker Classic	(United States) Commerce Casino, Los Angeles	(United States) Sean Jazayeri	$1,370,240
10	2011–2012	5-9 March 2012	WPT Bay 101 Shooting Star	(United States) Bay 101, San Jose, California	(South Korea) Moon Kim	$960,900
10	2011–2012	10-15 April 2012	WPT Vienna	Montesino Wien, Vienna, Austria	(Denmark) Morten Christensen	$417,458 (€313,390)
10	2011–2012	18-23 April 2012	WPT Seminole Hard Rock Poker Showdown	(United States) Seminole Hard Rock Hotel & Casino, Hollywood, Florida	(United States) Tommy Vedes (2)	$779,520
10	2011–2012	27 April-2 May 2012	WPT Jacksonville	(United States) BestBet Poker Room Jacksonville, Florida	(United States) Shawn Cunix	$426,100
10	2011–2012	19-26 May 2012	WPT World Championship	(United States) Bellagio, Las Vegas	(Germany) Marvin Rettenmaier	$1,196,858
11	2012–2013	4-9 August 2012	WPT Merit Cyprus Classic	Merit Crystal Cove Hotel-Casino, Kyrenia, Cyprus	(Germany) Marvin Rettenmaier (2)	$287,784
11	2012–2013	10-15 August 2012	WPT Parx Open Poker Classic	(United States) Parx Casino, Bensalem, Pennsylvania	(United States) Anthony Gregg	$416,127
11	2012–2013	24-28 August 2012	WPT Legends of Poker	(United States) The Bicycle Hotel & Casino, Bell Gardens, California	(United States) Josh Hale	$500,000
11	2012–2013	10-15 September 2012	WPT Grand Prix de Paris	Aviation Club de France, Paris	(Canada) Matthew Salsberg	$478,415 (€380,000)
11	2012–2013	16-20 September 2012	WPT Malta	Portomaso#Portomaso Casino, St. Julian's, Malta	(France) Yorane Kerignard	$155,049 (€120,000)
11	2012–2013	18-21 September 2012	WPT Borgata Poker Open	(United States) Borgata Hotel Casino & Spa, Atlantic City, New Jersey	(United States) Ben Hamnett	$818,847
11	2012–2013	22-26 October 2012	WPT Emperors Palace Poker Classic	Emperors Palace Hotel Casino, Johannesburg, South Africa	(Germany) Dominik Nitsche	$206,153
11	2012–2013	9-13 November 2012	WPT Jacksonville bestbet Fall Poker Scramble	(United States) BestBet Poker Room Jacksonville, Florida	(United States) Noah Schwartz	$402,972
11	2012–2013	12-17 November 2012	WPT Copenhagen	Casino Copenhagen, Copenhagen, Denmark	(Sweden) Emil Olsson	$230,036 (DKr1,346,000)
11	2012–2013	23-26 November 2012	WPT Montreal	Playground Poker Club, Kahnawake, Canada	(Canada) Jonathan Roy	$779,210
11	2012–2013	27 November-1 December 2012	WPT Mazagan	Mazagan Beach Resort, El Jadida, Morocco	(Italy) Giacomo Fundaro	$166,704 (درهم 4,731,700)
11	2012–2013	3-9 December 2012	WPT Prague	King's Casino, Prague, Czech Republic	(Poland) Marcin Wydrowski	$413,667 (€318,295)
11	2012–2013	4-9 December 2012	Five Diamond World Poker Classic	(United States) Bellagio, Las Vegas	(United States) Ravi Raghavan	$1,268,571
11	2012–2013	27 January-1 February 2013	WPT Borgata Winter Poker Open	(United States) Borgata Hotel Casino & Spa, Atlantic City, New Jersey	(United States) Yung Hwang	$730,053
11	2012–2013	8-12 February 2013	Seminole Hard Rock Lucky Hearts Poker Open	(United States) Seminole Hard Rock Hotel & Casino, Hollywood, Florida	(United States) Matt Giannetti (2)	$298,304
11	2012–2013	19-24 February 2013	WPT Baden	Casinos Austria, Baden, Austria	(Serbia) Vladimir Bozinovic	$247,588 (€185,000)
11	2012–2013	23-28 February 2013	WPT L.A. Poker Classic	(United States) Commerce Casino, Los Angeles	(Canada) Paul Klann	$1,004,090
11	2012–2013	4-8 March 2013	WPT Bay 101 Shooting Star	(United States) Bay 101, San Jose, California	(United States) WeiKai Chang	$1,138,350
11	2012–2013	25-30 March 2013	Gioco Digitale WPT Venice Grand Prix	Casino Di Venezia, Venice, Italy	(Italy) Rocco Palumbo	$180,692 (€140,000)
11	2012–2013	5-10 April 2013	bwin WPT Barcelona	Casino Barcelona, Barcelona Spain	(Canada) Chanracy Khun	$232,487 (€181,400)
11	2012–2013	11-16 April 2013	WPT Seminole Hard Rock Poker Showdown	(United States) Seminole Hard Rock Hotel & Casino, Hollywood, Florida	(United States) Kevin Eyster	$660,395
11	2012–2013	26-30 April 2013	WPT Jacksonville bestbet Open	(United States) BestBet Poker Room Jacksonville, Florida	(United States) Mike Linster	$296,521
11	2012–2013	3-9 May 2013	partypoker WPT Canadian Spring Championship	Playground Poker Club, Kahnawake, Canada	(Canada) Amir Babakhani	$430,986 (C$442,248)
11	2012–2013	18-24 May 2013	WPT World Championship	(United States) Bellagio, Las Vegas	(United States) David Rheem (2)	$1,150,297
12	2013–2014	16-21 August 2013	bwin WPT Merit Cyprus Classic	Merit Crystal Cove Hotel-Casino, Kyrenia, Cyprus	(Russia) Alexey Rybin	$258,000
12	2013–2014	29 August-4 September 2013	WPT Legends of Poker	(United States) The Bicycle Hotel & Casino, Bell Gardens, California	(United States) Jordan Cristos	$613,355
12	2013–2014	15-20 September 2013	WPT Borgata Winter Poker Open	(United States) Borgata Hotel Casino & Spa, Atlantic City, New Jersey	(United States) Anthony Zinno	$825,099
12	2013–2014	25-30 October 2013	bwin WPT Grand Prix de Paris	Aviation Club de France, Paris	(United States) Mohsin Charania	$449,856 (€328,750)
12	2013–2014	7-11 November 2013	WPT Emperors Palace Poker Classic	Emperors Palace Hotel Casino, Johannesburg, South Africa	(South Africa) Daniel Brits	$132,128
12	2013–2014	15-19 November 2013	WPT Jacksonville bestbet Fall Poker Scramble	(United States) BestBet Poker Room Jacksonville, Florida	(United States) Jared Jaffee	$252,749
12	2013–2014	19-24 November 2013	WPT Caribbean	(Sint Maarten) Casino Royale, St. Maarten	(United States) Tony Dunst	$145,000
12	2013–2014	29 November-5 December 2013	partypoker WPT Montreal	Playground Poker Club, Kahnawake, Canada	(United States) Derrick Rosenbarger	$517,049
12	2013–2014	6-11 December 2013	Five Diamond World Poker Classic	(United States) Bellagio, Las Vegas	(United States) Dan Smith	$1,161,135
12	2013–2014	15-19 December 2013	WPT Korea	Ramada Hotel, Jeju, South Korea	(Japan) Masato Yokosawa	$100,000
12	2013–2014	15-21 December 2013	bwin WPT Prague	Andel's Hotel & Card Casino, Prague, Czech Republic	(Germany) Julian Thomas	$280,097 (€206,230)
12	2013–2014	26-31 January 2014	WPT Borgata Winter Poker Open	(United States) Borgata Hotel Casino & Spa, Atlantic City, New Jersey	(United States) Robert Merulla	$842,379
12	2013–2014	7-11 February 2014	Seminole Hard Rock Lucky Hearts Poker Open	(United States) Seminole Casino, Coconut Creek, Florida	(United States) James Calderaro	$271,103
12	2013–2014	22-24 February 2014	WPT Fallsview Poker Classic	(Canada) Niagara Fallsview Casino Resort, Niagara Falls, Ontario	(Canada) Matthew Lapossie	$326,235 (C$363,197)
12	2013–2014	1-6 March 2014	WPT L.A. Poker Classic	(United States) Commerce Casino, Los Angeles	(United Kingdom) Chris Moorman	$1,015,460
12	2013–2014	10-14 March 2014	WPT Bay 101 Shooting Star	(United States) Bay 101, San Jose, California	(United States) James Carroll	$1,256,550
12	2013–2014	10-15 March 2014	Gioco Digitale WPT Venice Carnival	Casino Di Venezia, Venice, Italy	(Italy) Andrea Dato	$145,439 (€104,822)
12	2013–2014	15-19 March 2014	WPT Rolling Thunder	(United States) Thunder Valley Casino Resort, Lincoln, California	(Vietnam) J. C. Tran (2)	$302,750
12	2013–2014	21-25 March 2014	WPT Jacksonville bestbet Open	(United States) BestBet Poker Room Jacksonville, Florida	(United States) Nabil Hirezi	$206,041
12	2013–2014	10-16 April 2014	WPT Seminole Hard Rock Poker Showdown	(United States) Seminole Hard Rock Hotel & Casino, Hollywood, Florida	(Canada) Eric Afriat	$1,081,184
12	2013–2014	21-26 April 2014	WPT World Championship	(United States) Borgata Hotel Casino & Spa, Atlantic City, New Jersey	(United States) Keven Stammen	$1,350,000
13	2014–2015	1-6 July 2014	partypoker presents WPT500 Aria	(United States) Aria Resort and Casino, Las Vegas	(South Korea) Sean Yu	$260,000
13	2014–2015	23-29 August 2014	WPT Legends of Poker	(United States) The Bicycle Hotel & Casino, Bell Gardens, California	(United States) Harry Arutyunyan	$560,969
13	2014–2015	5-10 September 2014	partypoker WPT Merit Classic North Cyprus	Merit Crystal Cove Hotel-Casino, Kyrenia, Cyprus	(Russia) Alexander Lakhov	$325,400
13	2014–2015	14-19 September 2014	WPT Borgata Poker Open	(United States) Borgata Hotel Casino & Spa, Atlantic City, New Jersey	(United States) Darren Elias	$843,744
13	2014–2015	3-7 November 2014	WPT Caribbean	(Sint Maarten) Casino Royale, St. Maarten	(United States) Darren Elias (2)	$127,680
13	2014–2015	7-11 November 2014	WPT Jacksonville bestbet Bounty Scramble	(United States) BestBet Poker Room Jacksonville, Florida	(United States) Ryan Van Sanford	$421,668
13	2014–2015	9-16 November 2014	partypoker presents WPT500 Nottingham	Dusk Till Dawn, Nottingham, England	(United Kingdom) Eleanor Gudger	$222,176 (£140,000)
13	2014–2015	14-16 November 2014	WPT Emperors Palace Poker Classic	Emperors Palace Hotel Casino, Johannesburg, South Africa	(United States) Dylan Wilkerson	$145,836
13	2014–2015	18-23 November 2014	partypoker WPT Nottingham	Dusk Till Dawn, Nottingham, England	(Lithuania) Matas Cimbolas	$313,327 (£200,000)
13	2014–2015	20-26 November 2014	partypoker WPT Montreal	Playground Poker Club, Kahnawake, Canada	(United States) Jonathan Jaffe	$409,657 (C$464,252)
13	2014–2015	15-20 December 2014	Five Diamond World Poker Classic	(United States) Bellagio, Las Vegas	(United States) Mohsin Charania (2)	$1,177,890
13	2014–2015	25-30 January 2015	WPT Borgata Winter Poker Open	(United States) Borgata Hotel Casino & Spa, Atlantic City, New Jersey	(United States) Aaron Mermelstein	$712,305
13	2014–2015	5-11 February 2015	WPT Lucky Hearts Poker Open	(United States) Seminole Hard Rock Hotel & Casino, Hollywood, Florida	(United States) Brian Altman	$723,008
13	2014–2015	13-16 February 2015	WPT Fallsview Poker Classic	(Canada) Niagara Fallsview Casino Resort, Niagara Falls, Ontario	(United States) Anthony Zinno (2)	$302,235 (C$380,021)
13	2014–2015	28 February-5 March 2015	WPT L.A. Poker Classic	(United States) Commerce Casino, Los Angeles	(United States) Anthony Zinno (3)	$1,015,860
13	2014–2015	9-13 March 2015	WPT Bay 101 Shooting Star	(United States) Bay 101, San Jose, California	(United States) Taylor Paur	$1,214,200
13	2014–2015	12-17 March 2015	partypoker WPT Vienna	Montesino Wien, Vienna, Austria	(Greece) Konstantinos Nanos	$159,464 (€150,000)
13	2014–2015	15-19 March 2015	WPT Rolling Thunder	(United States) Thunder Valley Casino Resort, Lincoln, California	(United States) Ravee Mathi Sundar	$266,857
13	2014–2015	16-22 April 2015	WPT Seminole Hard Rock Poker Showdown	(United States) Seminole Hard Rock Hotel & Casino, Hollywood, Florida	(United States) Griffin Paul	$1,000,000
13	2014–2015	25-29 April 2015	WPT World Championship	(United States) Borgata Hotel Casino & Spa, Atlantic City, New Jersey	(United States) Asher Conniff	$973,683
14	2015–2016	1-6 May 2015	partypoker WPT Canadian Spring Championship	Playground Poker Club, Kahnawake, Canada	(Canada) Sheraz Nasir	$197,025 (C$237,390)
14	2015–2016	11-16 May 2015	WPT Amsterdam	Holland Casino Amsterdam City centre, Netherlands	(Morocco) Farid Yachou	$225,073 (€201,000)
14	2015–2016	31 May-6 July 2015	partypoker presents WPT500 Aria	(United States) Aria Resort and Casino, Las Vegas	(United States) Craig Varnell	$185,800
14	2015–2016	31 July-4 August 2015	WPT Choctaw	(United States) Choctaw Casinos & Resorts, Durant, Oklahoma	(United States) Jason Brin	$667,575
14	2015–2016	29 August-4 September 2015	WPT Legends of Poker	(United States) The Bicycle Hotel & Casino, Bell Gardens, California	(United States) Mike Shariati	$675,942
14	2015–2016	20-25 September 2015	WPT Borgata Poker Open	(United States) Borgata Hotel Casino & Spa, Atlantic City, New Jersey	(United States) David Paredes	$723,227
14	2015–2016	25-29 September 2015	WPT Maryland Live	(United States) Live! Casino & Hotel, Hanover, Maryland	(United States) Aaron Mermelstein (2)	$250,222
14	2015–2016	24 October-3 November 2015	partypoker presents WPT500 Nottingham	Dusk Till Dawn, Nottingham, England	(Wales) Richard Harris	$230,641 (£150,000)
14	2015–2016	30 October-1 November 2015	WPT Emperors Palace Poker Classic	Emperors Palace Hotel Casino, Johannesburg, South Africa	(South Africa) Ben Cade	$100,218 (ZAR1,382,000)
14	2015–2016	3-8 November 2015	partypoker WPT Nottingham	Dusk Till Dawn, Nottingham, England	(United Kingdom) Iaron Lightbourne	$308,766 (£200,000)
14	2015–2016	6-10 November 2015	WPT Jacksonville bestbet Bounty Scramble	(United States) BestBet Poker Room Jacksonville, Florida	(United States) Tyler Patterson	$375,270
14	2015–2016	13-19 November 2015	partypoker WPT Montreal	Playground Poker Club, Kahnawake, Canada	(United States) Jared Mahoney	$341,332 (C$453,122)
14	2015–2016	1-6 December 2015	partypoker WPT Prague	King's Casino, Prague, Czech Republic	(Spain) Javier Gomez	$185,110 (€175,000)
14	2015–2016	14-19 December 2015	Five Diamond World Poker Classic	(United States) Bellagio, Las Vegas	(United States) Kevin Eyster (2)	$1,587,382
14	2015–2016	31 January-5 February 2016	WPT Borgata Winter Poker Open	(United States) Borgata Hotel Casino & Spa, Atlantic City, New Jersey	(United States) Christopher Leong	$816,246
14	2015–2016	21-24 February 2016	WPT Fallsview Poker Classic	(Canada) Niagara Fallsview Casino Resort, Niagara Falls, Ontario	(Canada) David Ormsby	$278,426 (C$383,407)
14	2015–2016	27 February-3 March 2016	WPT L.A. Poker Classic	(United States) Commerce Casino, Los Angeles	(Germany) Dietrich Fast	$1,000,800
14	2015–2016	7-11 March 2016	WPT Bay 101 Shooting Star	(United States) Bay 101, San Jose, California	(Germany) Stefan Schillhabel	$1,298,000
14	2015–2016	12-16 March 2016	WPT Rolling Thunder	(United States) Thunder Valley Casino Resort, Lincoln, California	(United States) Harrison Gimbel	$275,112
14	2015–2016	15-20 March 2016	partypoker WPT Vienna	Montesino Wien, Vienna, Austria	(Romania) Vlad Darie	$174,735 (€157,000)
14	2015–2016	15-20 April 2016	WPT Seminole Hard Rock Poker Showdown	(United States) Seminole Hard Rock Hotel & Casino, Hollywood, Florida	(United States) Justin Young	$669,161
14	2015–2016	17-21 April 2016	WPT Seminole Hard Rock Poker Finale	(United States) Seminole Hard Rock Hotel & Casino, Hollywood, Florida	(United States) David Rheem (3)	$705,885
14	2015–2016	22-24 April 2016	Monster WPT Tournament of Champions	(United States) Seminole Hard Rock Hotel & Casino, Hollywood, Florida	(Morocco) Farid Yachou (2)	$381,600
15	2016–2017	April 20-May 5, 2016	Canadian Spring Championship	(Canada) Playground Poker Club, Kahnawake, Quebec	(United States) Seth Davies	$274,540(CAD)
15	2016–2017				(Serbia) Andjelko Andrejevic	$
15	2016–2017				(United States) James Mackey	$
15	2016–2017				(United States) Pat Lyons	$
15	2016–2017				(United States) Jesse Sylvia	$
15	2016–2017				(United States) Zachary Smiley	$
15	2016–2017				(United States) Sam Panzica	$
15	2016–2017				(Spain) Luis Rodriguez Cruz	$
15	2016–2017				(United States) Mike Sexton	$
15	2016–2017				(United Kingdom) Niall Farrell	$
15	2016–2017				(Ukraine) Oleg Vasylchenko	$
15	2016–2017				(United States) James Romero	$
15	2016–2017				(United States) Daniel Weinman	$
15	2016–2017				(Canada) Ema Zajmović	$
15	2016–2017				(United States) Darren Elias (3)	$
15	2016–2017				(United States) Daniel Strelitz	$
15	2016–2017				(United States) Sam Panzica (2)	$
15	2016–2017				(United States) Mike Del Vecchio	$
15	2016–2017				(United States) Tony Sinishtaj	$
15	2016–2017				(United States) Ryan Riess	$
15	2016–2017				(United States) Daniel Weinman (2)	$
16	2017–2018				(Taiwan) Pete Chen	$
16	2017–2018				(Kazakhstan) Daniel Daniyar	$
16	2017–2018				(United States) Jay Lee	$
16	2017–2018				(United States) Art Papazyan	$
16	2017–2018				(China) Guo Liang Chen	$
16	2017–2018				(United States) Art Papazyan (2)	$
16	2017–2018				(United States) Paul Petraglia	$
16	2017–2018				(Canada) Maxime Heroux	$
16	2017–2018				(United States) Ryan Tosoc	$
16	2017–2018				(Germany) Ole Schemion	$
16	2017–2018				(United States) Darryll Fish	$
16	2017–2018				(Canada) Eric Afriat (2)	$
16	2017–2018				(Canada) Mike Leah	$
16	2017–2018				(United States) Dennis Blieden	$
16	2017–2018				(United States) David Larson	$
16	2017–2018				(United Kingdom) Scott Margereson	$
16	2017–2018				(Netherlands) Rens Feenstra	$
16	2017–2018				(United States) Larry Greenberg	$
16	2017–2018				(United States) Darren Elias (4)	$
16	2017–2018				(United States) Matthew Waxman (2)	$
17	2018–2019				(United States) Simon Lam	$
17	2018–2019				(United States) Brady Holiman	$
17	2018–2019				(United States) Erkut Yilmaz	$
17	2018–2019				(United States) Tony Ruberto	$
17	2018–2019				(Vietnam) Tony Tran	$
17	2018–2019				(Canada) Patrick Serda	$
17	2018–2019				(Moldova) Pavel Plesuv	$
17	2018–2019				(United States) Dylan Linde	$
17	2018–2019				(United States) Frank Stepuchin	$
17	2018–2019				(Ukraine) Denys Shafikov	$
17	2018–2019				(United States) Vinicius Lima	$
17	2018–2019				(Canada) Demo Kiriopoulos	$
17	2018–2019				(United States) David "ODB" Baker	$
17	2018–2019				(United States) Erkut Yilmaz (2)	$
17	2018–2019				(Latvia) Vitalijs Zavorotnijs	$
17	2018–2019				(United States) Ben Palmer	$
17	2018–2019				(United States) James Carroll (2)	$
17	2018–2019				(United States) Craig Varnell	$
17	2018–2019				(United States) Matthew Wantman	$
17	2018–2019				(Germany) Ole Schemion (2)	$
18	2019–2021				(United States) Roger Teska	$
18	2019–2021				(United States) Aaron Van Blarcum	$
18	2019–2021				(United States) Donald Maloney	$
18	2019–2021				(United States) Nitis Udornpim	$
18	2019–2021				(Sweden) Simon Brändström	$
18	2019–2021				(United States) Josh Adkins	$
18	2019–2021				(Canada) Geoffrey Hum	$
18	2019–2021				(Bulgaria) Milen Stefanov	$
18	2019–2021				(United States) Alex Foxen	$
18	2019–2021				(United States) Markus Gonsalves	$
18	2019–2021				(United States) Brian Altman (2)	$
18	2019–2021				(Russia) Aleksey Badulin	$
18	2019–2021				(Canada) Veerab Zakarian	$
18	2019–2021				(Germany) Christopher Pütz	$
18	2019–2021				(Canada) Eric Afriat (3)	$
18	2019–2021				(United States) Balakrishna Patur	$
18	2019–2021				(Vietnam) Tony Tran (2)	$
18	2019–2021				(Sweden) Christian Jeppsson	$
18	2019–2021				(United Kingdom) Gavin Cochrane	$
18	2019–2021				(United States) Nick Petrangelo	$
18	2019–2021				(Republic of Ireland) Daniel Smyth	$
18	2019–2021				(Russia) Andrey Kotelnikov	$
18	2019–2021				(United Kingdom) Phillip Mighall	$
18	2019–2021				(United States) Soheb Porbandarwala	$
18	2019–2021				(United Kingdom) Jack Hardcastle	$
18	2019–2021				(United States) Ilyas Muradi	$
18	2019–2021				(Russia) Maksim Sekretarev	$
18	2019–2021				(United States) Qing Liu	$
18	2019–2021				(United States) Brek Schutten	$
19	2021–2022				(Germany) Christian Rudolph	$
19	2021–2022				(United States) Brian Altman (3)	$
19	2021–2022				(United States) Chad Eveslage	$
19	2021–2022				(United States) Adedapo Ajayi	$
19	2021–2022					$
19	2021–2022					$
19	2021–2022					$
19	2021–2022					$
19	2021–2022					$

== Records ==
Information correct as of May 24, 2024

Titles
Rank	Name	Titles
1	(United States) Darren Elias	4
2	(Canada) Eric Afriat	3
2	(United States) Brian Altman	3
2	(Denmark) Gus Hansen	3
2	(Ecuador) Carlos Mortensen	3
2	(United States) David Rheem	3
2	(United States) Anthony Zinno	3

Final tables
Rank	Name	Final tables
1	(United States) Darren Elias	13
2	(United States) Phil Ivey	9
3	(Vietnam) Scotty Nguyen	8
4	(Canada) Eric Afriat	7
4	(United States) Brian Altman	7
4	(United States) Tony Dunst	7
4	(United States) Darryll Fish	7
4	(Denmark) Gus Hansen	7
4	(United States) Michael Mizrachi	7
4	(Canada) Daniel Negreanu	7
4	(Vietnam) David Pham	7
4	(Vietnam) J.C. Tran	7
4	(United States) Anthony Zinno	7

Money finishes
Rank	Name	Money finishes
1	(United States) Darren Elias	46
2	(United States) Anthony Zinno	39
3	(United States) Brian Altman	34
4	(United States) Jake Schwartz	33
T5	(United States) Mohsin Charania	32
T5	(United States) Justin Zaki	32

=== Record winnings ===
The largest win in a WPT event is the $5,282,954 paid to Daniel Sepiol for winning the season-ending WPT Championship for season 21.

==== Progression of largest winnings ====
The progression of the "highest payout" through the history of the WPT, starting with the win by Gus Hansen in Event 1 of WPT Season 1. Entries have declined since the poker boom ended, with no increase in "highest payout" for a number of years – the highest has not increased since an event in 2007.

Season	Event	Winner	Prize
1	#1 – Five Diamond World Poker Classic 2002	(Denmark) Gus Hansen	$556,480
1	#6 – World Poker Open 2003	(United Kingdom) Dave Ulliott	$589,175
2	#5 – World Poker Finals 2003	(United States) Hoyt Corkins	$1,089,200
2	#6 – Five Diamond World Poker Classic 2003	(United States) Paul Phillips	$1,101,980
2	#8 – World Poker Open 2004	(United States) Barry Greenstein	$1,278,370
2	#9 – LA Poker Classic 2004	(United States) Antonio Esfandiari	$1,399,135
3	#7 – World Poker Finals 2004	(Vietnam) Tuan Le	$1,549,588
3	#8 – Five Diamond World Poker Classic 2004	(Canada) Daniel Negreanu	$1,759,218
3	#11 – LA Poker Classic 2005	(United States) Michael Mizrachi	$1,859,909
4	#7 – World Poker Finals 2005	(United States) Nick Schulman	$2,142,000
4	#12 – LA Poker Classic 2006	(United States) Alan Goehring	$2,391,550
5	#14 – LA Poker Classic 2007	(United States) Eric Hershler	$2,429,970
6	#11 – Doyle Brunson Classic 2007	(Ukraine) Eugene Katchalov	$2,482,605

==== WPT World Championship ($25,000 buy-in) ====
Each WPT season culminates with the $25,000 buy-in WPT World Championship (simply the WPT Championship before season 9). As with regular events, the prize pool has declined since the poker boom ended: participants dropped from a peak of 639 in 2007, to 146 in 2013. The WPT organizers reacted by dropping the buy-in to $15,000 from 2014 onwards, limiting participation to winners of WPT events since the start of the series, and changing the name again, to WPT Tournament of Champions. There has been no increase in "highest payout" since the $3,970,415 at the 2005 World Championship, and the top prize has consistently been under $500,000 since the 2016 World Championship. Following the COVID-19 pandemic, the WPT rebranded its World Championship event with a $10,000 buy-in open tournament in 2022 and 2023, hosted at the Wynn Las Vegas. Both events set WPT records in field size and prize pools guarantees, with the 2023 edition prize pool guarantee of 40 million setting a poker industry record and a top prize of over $5 million.

Season	Event	Winner	Prize
1	WPT Championship – Season I	(United States) Alan Goehring	$1,011,866
2	WPT Championship – Season II	(Sweden) Martin de Knijff	$2,728,356
3	WPT Championship – Season III	(Vietnam) Tuan Le	$2,856,150
4	WPT Championship – Season IV	(United States) Joe Bartholdi Jr.	$3,760,165
5	WPT Championship – Season V	(Ecuador) Carlos Mortensen	$3,970,415
6	WPT Championship – Season VI	(China) David Chiu	$3,389,140
7	WPT Championship – Season VII	(Ukraine) Yevgeniy Timoshenko	$2,149,960
8	WPT Championship – Season VIII	(United States) David Williams	$1,530,537
9	WPT World Championship – Season IX	(United States) Scott Seiver	$1,618,344
10	WPT World Championship – Season X	(Germany) Marvin Rettenmaier	$1,196,858
11	WPT World Championship – Season XI	(United States) David Rheem	$1,150,279
12	WPT World Championship – Season XII	(United States) Keven Stammen	$1,350,000
13	WPT World Championship – Season XIII	(United States) Asher Conniff	$973,683
14	WPT Tournament of Champions – Season XIV	(Morocco) Farid Yachou	$381,600
15	WPT Tournament of Champions – Season XV	(United States) Daniel Weinman	$381,500
16	WPT Tournament of Champions – Season XVI	(United States) Matthew Waxman	$463,375
17	WPT Tournament of Champions – Season XVII	(Germany) Ole Schemion	$440,395
18–19	No events		
20	WPT World Championship 2022	(Canada) Eliot Hudon	$4,136,000
21	WPT World Championship 2023	(United States) Daniel Sepiol	$5,282,954
22	WPT World Championship 2024	(United States) Scott Stewart	$2,563,900
23	WPT World Championship 2025	(United States) Schuyler Thornton	$2,258,856

== WPT Ladies ==
In January 2008, the WPT announced a set of tournaments for women, known as WPT Ladies. The first season had five events, with buy-ins ranging from $300 to $1,500. Nancy Todd finished first in the Ladies Championship with Vanessa Selbst finishing second. There are currently no WPT Ladies events scheduled.

== WPT Walk of Fame ==
The World Poker Tour Walk of Fame was designed to honor those poker players who have played the game well at the highest levels as well as those who have promoted the spread of it through film, television, and literature.

The first inductees were poker legends Doyle Brunson and Gus Hansen, as well as actor James Garner.

In February 2004, the World Poker Tour Walk of Fame inducted its second members at the Commerce Casino in a ceremony before top pros and celebrities in town for the World Poker Tour Invitational Poker Tournament. The induction ceremony was staged on the doorstep of Commerce Casino.

No new players have been inducted since 2004.

== WPT Honors Award ==
The WPT Honors Award launched in early 2017, with Ms. Linda Johnson named as the first recipient. Later that year, 15-year WPT commentator Mike Sexton and gaming industry icon Bruno Fitoussi became the second and third honorees. In 2018, Steve Lipscomb and Lyle Berman each received the fourth and fifth honors.

The WPT Honors Award is the WPT's highest honor, awarded to members of the poker industry in celebration and appreciation of exceptional contributions made to the World Poker Tour and the poker community as a whole. Presented as determined by WPT CEO Adam Pliska and the World Poker Tour, the WPT Honors Award is given in recognition to those who distinguish themselves by excellence and dedication beyond expectations.

=== WPT Honors Award Recipients ===
- 2017: Bruno Fitoussi, Linda Johnson, Mike Sexton
- 2018: Lyle Berman, Steve Lipscomb
- 2019: Deb Giardina, Matt Savage
- 2022: Isai Scheinberg, Vincent Van Patten

== Deal ==
A fictional WPT championship match is the setting for the 2007 feature film Deal. Sexton, Van Patten, and Friel play themselves and a number of other poker professionals and poker-playing celebrities are reportedly in the cast. The WPT set was shipped to New Orleans for filming following the season 4 championship.

== See also ==
- List of television shows set in Las Vegas
