= Stammen =

Stammen is a surname of Dutch origin. Notable people with the surname include:

- Craig Stammen (born 1984), American baseball player
- Keven Stammen (born 1985), American poker player
