= Andrew Lichtenberger =

American poker player (born 1987)

- Nickname: LuckyChewy
- Born: September 20, 1987 (age 39); East Northport, New York
- Pokerisms: Meditation Call; Mind Stimulation Tool; Mind Stipulation Tool
World Series of Poker
- Bracelet: 1
- Final tables: 5
- Money finishes: 29
- Highest WSOP Main Event finish: 18th, 2009
World Poker Tour
- Title: 1
- Final tables: 4
- Money finishes: 9

Andrew Lichtenberger (born September 20, 1987) is an American poker player from East Northport, New York. He is also known by his online alias LuckyChewy. He is the champion of the 2010 World Series of Poker Circuit event in Caesars Palace, Las Vegas in April 2010. Lichtenberger has made five World Series of Poker final tables and won a WSOP bracelet in 2016.

== Early years ==
Lichtenberger was born in 1987 in East Northport, New York. He began playing poker at the age of 18, mainly online. After playing in cash games Andrew switched to multi-table tournaments and was successful. He first stepped in the live tournament arena in 2007. Lichtenberger had five WSOP cashes in his first two years playing.

== Poker career ==
Lichtenberger is formerly sponsored by Ivey Poker until Ivey Poker shut down.

=== World Series of Poker ===
Lichtenberger's WSOP cashes exceed $2,000,000. He has one circuit ring from the Caesars Palace for winning the circuit main event in 2010. His first cash is from the June 2009 No Limit Hold'em event for $14,413. He cashed at the One Drop High Roller Event in June 2015 winning over $390,000. His largest cash is from World Championship Hold'em event in July 2009 for $500,557.

=== World Poker Tour ===
Lichtenberger has a total of nine World Poker Tour cashes on his record. The first one came in 2009, when he finished 13th in the Five Star World Poker Classic Championship for more than $80,000. His latest one is from March 2015, when he finished 17th in the No Limit Hold'em Bay 101 event. His biggest WPT cash is from December 2014, when he won the Alpha8 Las Vegas No Limit event and took $2,104,245 in cash. At the final table, he was playing Heads-up against Tom Marchese.

=== European Poker Tour ===
Lichtenberger has no European Poker Tour titles to his name. His biggest cash is a first-place finish in a Heads-up event in the EPT Grand Final, Madrid, 2011. His latest EPT cash is from August 2013, when he finished 69th in No Limit Hold'em event, for €3,460.

His first cash is from January 2009, the European Poker Tour Main Event, when he finished 157th for $12,500. He was in the list of EPT season 7 list of nominated poker players.

As of May 2020, his total live tournament earnings exceed $10,464,811.

== Achievements ==
Lichtenberger was formerly sponsored by Full Tilt Poker. He has given many interviews, talking about topics such as spirituality and health.
