= 2009–10 World Series of Poker Circuit =

Series of poker tournaments

The 2009–10 World Series of Poker Circuit is the 6th annual World Series of Poker Circuit.

== Event schedule ==
Date	Location	Winner	Prize	Runner-up	Other Finalists
October 25, 2009	Harrah's Horseshoe Casino Hammond	Daniel Livingston	$291,749	Thanasi Floros	Christopher Gentile; James Mosele; William Schweinebraten; William Miner; Joshua Goldstein; Jacob Bazeley; Mike Parisi
November 2, 2009	Horseshoe Southern Indiana	Gabriel Cook	$92,430	Christopher Tryba	David Leonard; Ronald Surenkamp; Chase Steely; Harold Evans; Jamin Stokes; Steve Galey; Karen Hayden
November 17, 2009	Harveys Resort & Casino, Lake Tahoe	Matt Keikoan	$106,435	Justin Hallstrom	John Goodger; Alan Engel; Tommy Vedes; Roger Sippl; David Woo; Timothy Davey; John McNeilly
December 15, 2009	Harrah's Atlantic City	Chris Klodnicki	$215,915	Kyle Bowker	Grayson Ramage; Mukul Pahuja; Karp Ryan; Charles Furey; Wayne Lewis; Farzad Rouhani; Eugene Fouksman
February 10, 2010	Harrah's Casino Tunica	Paul Wasicka	$139,422	Larry Gurney	Richard Robb; Shane Zell; Carter Phillips; Dwyte Pilgrim; Matt Stout; Jason Thornhill; Jerry Saucier
March 2, 2010	Horseshoe Council Bluffs	Jovan Sudar	$95,455	Gerald Walter	Derek Masek; Jack Do; Michael Sortino
March 14, 2010	Caesars Atlantic City	Roland Isra	$264,715	Chris Mitchell	Daniel Witcher; Chris Klodnicki; Jesse Chinni; Grayson Ramage; Feming Chan; Konstantino Dimitroulakis; Richard Austin
March 31, 2010	Harrah's Rincon San Diego	Bryan Devoshire	$114,975	Daniel Schreiber	Howard Andrew; John Farrell; Ronald Segni; Michael McClain; Daniel Burke
April 15, 2010	Harrah's St.Louis	Jeffrey Roper	$170,814	Jason Mo	Gary Lambert; Matthew Schwarmann; Jordan Portell; Joel Casper; Gregory Headrick; Gary Bolden; Michael Sortino
April 30, 2010	Caesars Palace	Andrew Lichtenberger	$190,137	Dan Casetta	Brock Parker; Diego Sanchez; James Carroll; Stephen O'Dwyer; Anthony Yeh; Aaron Been; Matt Stout
May 19, 2010	Harrah's New Orleans	Fred Berger	$197,584	Mike Beasley	Ben Keiley; Edward Corrado; Fernando Perez; Joel Merwick; Jacob Naquin; Chander Jain; Jared Ingles
