= World Poker Tour season 21 results =

Below are the results for season 21 (XXI) of the World Poker Tour (2023). There were eight scheduled events for the season.

The final tables for each of the Seminole Hard Rock Poker Showdown, WPT Choctaw, and WPT Gardens Poker Championship, which started in California, Florida and Oklahoma, respectively, would be delayed by a few days and played out in May 2023 at the HyperX Esports Arena at the Luxor in Las Vegas, Nevada.

== Events ==
=== WPT Rolling Thunder ===
- Casino: Thunder Valley Casino Resort, Lincoln, California
- Buy-in: $3,500
- 6-Day Event: April 1–4, 2023
- Number of Entries: 590
- Total Prize Pool: $1,888,000
- Number of Payouts: 74

Final Table
Place	Name	Prize
1st	(United States) Scott Eskenazi	$361,660
2nd	(United States) Jeremy Joseph	$234,000
3rd	(United States) Alejandro Jauregui	$172,000
4th	(United States) Albert Tapia	$128,000
5th	(United States) Victor Paredes	$97,000
6th	(United States) Tony Dunst	$73,400

=== Seminole Hard Rock Poker Showdown ===
- Casino: Seminole Hard Rock Hotel & Casino, Hollywood, Florida
- Buy-in: $3,500
- 5-Day Event: April 28 - May 2, 2023
- Number of Entries: 2,290
- Total Prize Pool: $7,328,000
- Number of Payouts: 287

Final Table
Place	Name	Prize
1st	(United States) Bin Weng	$1,128,250
2nd	(United States) Sridhar Sangannagari	$745,000
3rd	(United States) Mitch Garshofsky	$550,000
4th	(Azerbaijan) David Mzareulov	$413,000
5th	(United States) Naing Thu	$312,000
6th	(Peru) Rafael FarahLaufer	$238,000

=== WPT Choctaw ===
- Casino: Choctaw Casino & Resort, Durant, Oklahoma
- Buy-in: $3,800
- 6-Day Event: May 5–8, 2023
- Number of Entries: 612
- Total Prize Pool: $2,754,500
- Number of Payouts: 78

Final Table
Place	Name	Prize
1st	(United States) Jared Jaffee	$400,740
2nd	(United States) Dojie Ignacio	$261,000
3rd	(United States) Mike Vanier	$192,000
4th	(United States) Bin Weng	$143,000
5th	(Canada) Rusty Farrin	$107,000
6th	(United States) Erkut Yilmaz	$81,700

=== WPT Gardens Poker Championship ===
- Casino: The Gardens Casino, Hawaiian Gardens, California
- Buy-in: $5,250
- 5-Day Event: May 21–25, 2023
- Number of Entries: 346
- Total Prize Pool: $1,678,100
- Number of Payouts: 46

Final Table
Place	Name	Prize
1st	(Vietnam) Ky Nguyen	$357,380
2nd	(United States) Ryan Salunga	$230,000
3rd	(United States) Chris Lee	$169,000
4th	(United States) Brad Owen	$125,000
5th	(United States) Joey Deluca	$94,000
6th	(United States) Josh Lachman	$71,200

=== WPT Australia ===
- Casino: The Star Gold Coast, Gold Coast, Australia
- Buy-in: AU$8,000
- 5-Day Event: September 22–27, 2023
- Number of Entries: 600
- Total Prize Pool: AU$4,500,000
- Number of Payouts: 76

Final Table
Place	Name	Prize
1st	(Australia) Richard Lee	AU$854,890
2nd	(Australia) Martin Kozlov	AU$559,672
3rd	(Australia) Nino Marotta	AU$413,873
4th	(China) Garry Lin	AU$308,499
5th	(France) Romain Morvan	AU$232,720
6th	(Australia) Ken Demlakian	AU$177,566

=== WPT bestbet Scramble ===
- Casino: bestbet Jacksonville, Jacksonville, Florida
- Buy-in: $5,000
- 5-Day Event: November 10–14, 2023
- Number of Entries: 365
- Total Prize Pool: $1,660,750
- Number of Payouts: 46

Final Table
Place	Name	Prize
1st	(Canada) Frederic Normand	$351,650
2nd	(United States) Heng Zhang	$226,700
3rd	(Germany) Toby Boas	$166,800
4th	(United States) Michael Frierson	$123,900
5th	(United States) Ian O'Hara	$92,900
6th	(United States) Brian Senie	$70,400

=== Seminole Rock 'N' Roll Poker Open ===
- Casino: Seminole Hard Rock Hotel & Casino, Hollywood, Florida
- Buy-in: $3,500
- 5-Day Event: November 24–29, 2023
- Number of Entries: 1,477
- Total Prize Pool: $4,630,400
- Number of Payouts: 181

Final Table
Place	Name	Prize
1st	(Hungary) Istvan Briski	$647,300
2nd	(Canada) Rayan Chamas	$600,000
3rd	(United States) Sandy Sanchez	$366,500
4th	(United States) Fred Goldberg	$274,000
5th	(United States) Matt Bond	$206,900
6th	(United States) Darryll Fish	$157,800

=== WPT World Championship at Wynn Las Vegas ===
- Casino: Wynn Las Vegas, Las Vegas, Nevada
- Buy-in: $10,400
- 5-Day Event: December 12–20, 2023
- Number of Entries: 3,835
- Total Prize Pool: $40,000,000
- Number of Payouts: 480

Final Table
Place	Name	Prize
1st	(United States) Daniel Sepiol	$5,282,954
2nd	(Greece) Georgios Sotiropoulos	$4,167,246
3rd	(United States) Andrew Lichtenberger	$2,798,700
4th	(England) Chris Moorman	$2,095,300
5th	(England) Benjamin Heath	$1,583,100
6th	(Russia) Artur Martirosian	$1,207,000
