= Dusk Till Dawn (casino) =

Coordinates: 52°56′07″N 1°10′43″W

- Interactive map of Dusk Till Dawn Poker Club
- Location: Nottingham, United Kingdom; Redfield Way, Boulevard Retail Park, Lenton NG7 2UW, United Kingdom
- Opened: 2007
- Casino type: Land-Based
- Owner: Rob Yong
- Website: Dusk Till Dawn

Dusk Till Dawn Poker Club is a cardroom in Nottingham, England located in the Boulevard Retail Park on the edge of the city. The club opened in 2007 and is owned by Rob Yong.

== History ==
In 2006, Yong and his friend Nick Whiten were turned away from a poker tournament at their local casino after arriving one minute too late. As a result, Yong decided to open his own casino. Professional poker player Sam Trickett was at the cardroom on opening night and described it as a "place specifically for people to play poker".

In 2007, Yong opened Dusk Till Dawn as a casino focused on low-stakes and recreational poker players. The casino helped the growth of the game in Nottingham.

The name Dusk Till Dawn Casino was inspired by the film From Dusk till Dawn.

== Cardroom ==
The cardroom features 45 poker tables and includes automatic roulette and slot machines, having stopped offering table games in 2019. In 2015, PartyPoker partnered with Dusk Till Dawn, subsequently hosting "The PartyPoker Grand Prix.

In 2017, the casino held the PartyPoker LIVE MILLIONS Dusk Till Dawn festival. The main event, with a buy-in of £5,300 ($6,600 USD), created a prize pool of £6,017,395 ($7 million USD). Maria Lampropulos won the main event, taking home £1,000,000. The £10,300 High Roller game saw Vojtech Ruzicka emerge victorious, earning US$363,135. This festival highlights the significant events and high-stakes poker games that attract players worldwide.

== See also ==
- List of casinos
