= Keven Stammen =

American poker player (born 1985)

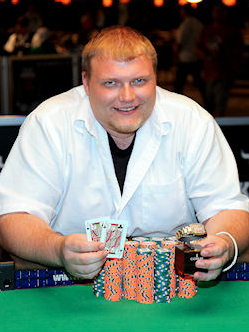
- Stammen after winning at the 2009 World Series of Poker
- Nickname: Stammdogg
- Born: November 15, 1985 (age 41)

World Series of Poker
- Bracelet: 1
- Final table: 1
- Money finishes: 10
- Highest WSOP Main Event finish: 860th, 2016

World Poker Tour
- Title: 1
- Final tables: 3
- Money finishes: 19

European Poker Tour
- Title: None
- Money finish: 1

Keven Stammen (born November 15, 1985) is an American poker player living in Celina, Ohio. He was winner of a No Limit Texas hold 'em event of the 2009 World Series of Poker.

Stammen has played poker professionally since he was 18. His total live tournament winnings exceed $4,250,000. Stammen plays on Full Tilt Poker and PokerStars as Stammdogg and stamdogg3 on Absolute Poker. Stammen ranked #5 in 2008 on Officialpokerrankings.com for Pokerstars. Stammen also won the World Poker Tour World Championship in Season XII.

Stammen won $506,786 in his World Series of Poker victory.
