= Aviation Club de France =

Defunct French casino

- Location in Paris
- Interactive map of Aviation Club de France
- Location: Paris, France; 48.87216°N 2.30208°E
- Opened: 1907
- Closed: 2014

Aviation Club de France was a gambling club in central Paris, France.

The club opened in 1907. In 2005, the Grand Prix de Paris leg of the World Poker Tour took place at the Aviation Club.

The club closed in 2014 after a police raid amid allegations of money laundering, and was placed in liquidation in February 2015.
