= Playground Poker Club =

Casino in Quebec, Canada

Playground
- Interactive map of Playground
- Location: Kahnawà:ke, Quebec, Canada
- Address: 1500 Route 138, Kahnawà:ke, QC
- Opening date: 2010
- Theme: Contemporary
- Signature attractions: Poker tournaments, EGDs, steakhouse dining
- Notable restaurants: The Rail, Drunken Dragon, etc.
- Casino type: Land-based
- Owner: Privately held (Mohawk-operated)
- Operating license holder: Kahnawà:ke Gaming Commission
- Website: Playground.ca

Playground (formerly known as Playground Poker Club) is a land-based gaming and entertainment complex located in the Mohawk Territory of Kahnawà:ke, just south of Montreal, Quebec, Canada. Established in 2010, Playground is best known for its poker operations and has expanded over the years to become one of the largest and most diverse gaming destinations in the country.

== Overview ==
Playground features over 1,000 electronic gaming devices (EGDs), including themed video slots and electronic table games such as blackjack, roulette, and baccarat. The property has earned a reputation for offering one of the most complete gaming experiences in Canada, supported by multiple restaurants, player promotions, and live entertainment.

== Poker ==
Playground rose to prominence as a premier poker destination in North America. It has hosted numerous high-profile tournaments, including stops on the World Series of Poker Circuit (WSOP-C), World Poker Tour (WPT), and partypoker LIVE. In 2017, Playground received the Event of the Year award at the American Poker Awards for MILLIONS North America. In 2024, it was named Fans Choice: Poker Room of the Year at the Global Poker Awards.

The poker room features 44 permanent tables used for cash games and tournaments. An auxiliary poker room with 26 additional tables is opened during large-scale events to accommodate higher player volume.

== Bad Beat Jackpot records ==
Playground offers a Bad Beat Jackpot in their poker room. The property has awarded multiple jackpots exceeding $1 million, including two separate payouts of over $2 million, which are among the highest documented bad beat jackpots ever recorded in a live poker room.

== Gaming ==
In addition to poker, Playground offers over 1,000 EGDs across two floors. Designated smoking rooms equipped with EGDs are available on each level, providing amenities that are uncommon in many Canadian gaming venues. The property also runs frequent in-house promotions, including gifting programs, weekly draws, and jackpot bonuses.

== Dining ==
Playground features multiple full-service restaurants:

The Rail – A comfort food restaurant known for generous portions and popular breakfast specials.

Drunken Dragon – A Japanese concept offering sushi, authentic noodle dishes, sake, cocktails, and whisky.

etc. – A contemporary steakhouse focused on premium cuts of meat and curated dining experiences.

== Entertainment ==
Playground includes a live entertainment space used for DJ sets, themed events, and musical acts. The venue is typically standing-room only but can be converted to cabaret-style seating for up to 80 guests.

== Ownership and licensing ==
Playground is located on sovereign Mohawk territory and operates under a gaming license issued by the Kahnawà:ke Gaming Commission (KGC), an internationally recognized authority for online and land-based gaming regulation.

== Notable events ==
Playground has hosted some of Canada's largest poker tournaments, including record-breaking WSOP-C and WPT events. Its location near Montreal and the U.S. border, along with its wide array of amenities, has made it a destination for both recreational and professional players.

== See also ==
- Mohawks of Kahnawà:ke
- Kahnawake
- Kahnawake Gaming Commission
- List of casinos in Canada
