= Bay 101 =

Coordinates: 37.3696404°N 121.9133539°W

- Interactive map of Bay 101
- Location: San Jose, California; 1788 North First Street
- Opened: 1929 (Sutter’s Club); 1994 (Bay 101)
- Casino type: Cardroom
- Owner: Bumb & Associates
- Previous names: Sutter’s Club (1929-1992)
- Website: bay101.com

Bay 101 is a cardroom in San Jose, California. Like other California cardrooms, Bay 101 offers poker cash games and tournaments as well as special "California" style table games.

Bay 101 is perhaps best known for hosting the Bay 101 Shooting Star, a World Poker Tour tournament created by Bay 101 owner Marko Trapani in 1997. The Bay 101 Shooting Star is a major bounty tournament, and the only one of its type on the World Poker Tour.

== History ==
In 1929, Joseph Sutter Sr. purchased the Panama Inn in Alviso, which he would rename as Sutter's Club. Sutter's son, Joseph Sutter Jr., took over the establishment in 1947, and added poker tables in 1961.

In 1989, Caltrans released plans for widening of Highway 237 that would require demolishing the club. A group of investors including Berryessa Flea Market owner Jeff Bumb announced a plan to acquire a 49 percent interest in Sutter's Place and move it to a new, larger facility. The move would have been prohibited under a 1978 city law intended to phase out card rooms by ending issuance of new licenses and transfers of existing licenses. However, Bumb's group successfully lobbied the city council to amend the law to allow Sutter's to move to a new location and expand to 40 tables.

Sutter's closed in June 1992. Initial plans called for it to move to the Italian Gardens complex near Downtown San Jose, but negotiations with the site owner failed. Developers instead selected a site in an industrial area near Highway 101. A contest was held to choose a new name for the casino, and Bay 101 was selected out of 7,400 entries. The cardroom was built at its new location at a cost of $15 million.

Bay 101 held a grand opening in November 1993, but could not offer gaming because background checks for the owners' gaming license had not been completed; only the restaurants and bar were operating. As the licensing process dragged on, the club was closed and its 600 employees were laid off in December. The state Department of Justice eventually denied Bay 101's license application because of alleged failures to disclose certain financial information, and other reasons that were not made public. The shareholders then agreed to sell their stakes in the business to brothers Tim Bumb and George Bumb Jr., who had previously been only passive investors, and were seen as the most likely to successfully appeal the state's decision. Under the sole ownership of Tim and George, Bay 101 received a provisional gaming license in August 1994. The card room finally opened and dealt its first games on September 9, 1994.

Bay 101 announced plans in 2013 to move across the freeway to the site of the San Jose Airport Hotel, near the new location of the city's other cardroom, Casino M8trix. The Bumb family had purchased the hotel in 2012 for more than $20 million, in anticipation of the cardroom's lease coming to an end in 2017. An alternative plan emerged in June 2014, as Bay 101 lobbied for permission to move to Milpitas, where it would pay a lower tax rate and be allowed to expand to 115 tables. That plan was rejected, however, by Milpitas voters. The Airport Hotel was demolished in December 2015 to make way for Bay 101's new $100-million casino, hotel, and, office complex. The first phase of the new complex, comprising the casino and a restaurant, opened in September 2017.

== See also ==
- List of casinos in California
