= Bellagio (resort) =

Luxury hotel and casino on the Las Vegas Strip

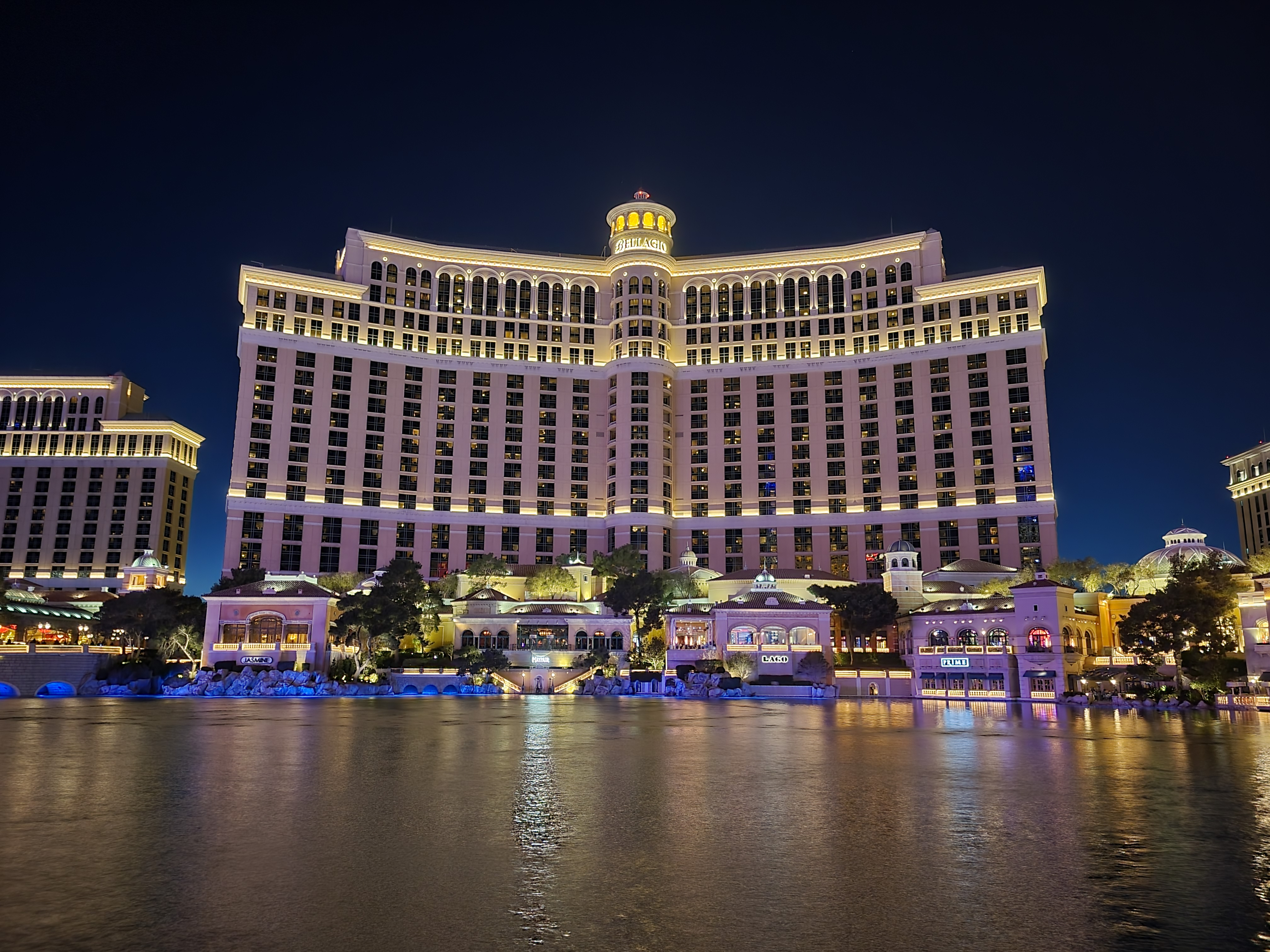
- The Bellagio in 2021

- Location within Las Vegas Strip Location within Nevada Location within the United States
- Interactive map of Bellagio
- Location: Paradise, Nevada, U.S.; 3600 South Las Vegas Boulevard; 36°06′47″N 115°10′35″W
- Opened: October 15, 1998; 28 years ago
- Theme: Bellagio, Italy
- No. of rooms: 3,933
- Gaming space: 156,000 sq ft (14,500 m^{2})
- Permanent shows: O
- Signature attractions: Bellagio Gallery of Fine Art; Conservatory; Fountains of Bellagio; Fiori di Como
- Notable restaurants: Carbone Riviera; Le Cirque; Harvest; Michael Mina; Prime Steakhouse; LAGO by Julian Serrano; Spago
- Casino type: Land-based
- Owner: Blackstone Inc. Realty Income (21.9%)
- Operating license holder: MGM Resorts International
- Architect: Jon Jerde; Atlandia Design (interior design)
- Renovated in: 2003–04, 2007, 2011–2015, 2021, 2023
- Website: bellagio.com

Bellagio (/bəˈlɑːʒi.oʊ/ bə-LAH-zhee-oh) is a resort, luxury hotel, and casino on the Las Vegas Strip in Paradise, Nevada. It is owned by Blackstone Inc. and operated by MGM Resorts International. Bellagio was conceived by casino owner Steve Wynn, and was built on the former site of the Dunes hotel-casino. Wynn's company, Mirage Resorts (now MGM resorts international), purchased the Dunes in 1992. Plans were announced in 1994 to replace it with Beau Rivage, a French-themed resort. In 1995, Wynn changed the project plans to instead theme it after the village of Bellagio, on Lake Como. The resort was designed by Jon Jerde. Construction began on November 1, 1995, with Marnell Corrao Associates as general contractor.

Bellagio opened on October 15, 1998, with 3,005 rooms in a 36-story tower. Built at a cost of $1.6 billion, it was the world's most expensive resort up to that point. Early revenue was less than expected, and Wynn departed the resort in May 2000, when Mirage Resorts merged with billionaire investor Kirk Kerkorian's MGM Grand Inc. Profits improved under the ownership of the newly formed MGM Mirage (later MGM Resorts). A 33-story hotel tower, with 928 rooms, was opened in 2004. MGM owned Bellagio until 2019, when it sold the resort to Blackstone Inc. for $4.25 billion. MGM continues to operate the property under a lease arrangement.

Bellagio is located on 77 acres (31 ha). It includes a 156,000 sq ft (14,500 m^{2}) casino and 3,933 rooms. The resort's signature attraction is the Fountains of Bellagio, a dancing water fountain synchronized to music. It is performed in an 8.5-acre man-made lake, located in front of the resort. Other attractions include the Bellagio Gallery of Fine Art, and a conservatory and botanical gardens. The hotel lobby features Fiori di Como, a sculpture by glass artist Dale Chihuly. It is the world's largest glass sculpture.

Bellagio has numerous restaurants including Le Cirque, Spago by Wolfgang Puck, PRIME Steakhouse, the eponymous Michael Mina, and Carbone Riviera. Bellagio includes an 1,800 seat theater for performances of O, a water-themed show by Cirque du Soleil. The property also has a high-end retail area which introduced several luxury brands to Las Vegas, including Chanel, Gucci, and Prada.

== History ==
=== Background and development ===
The site of Bellagio was previously occupied by the Dunes hotel-casino, which opened in 1955. Through his company Mirage Resorts, casino owner Steve Wynn purchased the Dunes in November 1992, for $75 million. He intended to demolish it and build a new resort in its place. An early idea was to build five or six complexes with approximately 500 rooms each, along with a small theme park. As the Dunes closed in January 1993, Wynn proposed including a man-made lake in his new project for water skiing and windsurfing. County officials questioned whether such a feature could be included following the passage of a 1990 water ordinance. A state expert found it unlikely that the lake would cause major soil sinking. The county modified the ordinance in February 1994, allowing Wynn to proceed with a man-made lake, on the condition that he honor his claim that it would use less water than the Dunes' former golf course.

On October 17, 1994, Mirage Resorts announced plans to build the French-themed Beau Rivage resort on the land, at a cost of $700-$900 million. It would be surrounded by a 50-acre lake with guests entering by footbridges. Mirage Resorts announced a name change in July 1995, stating that the resort would be named Bellagio, after the village of Bellagio, Lombardy in northern Italy. The resort's designer, Jon Jerde, had been vacationing on Lake Como. Impressed by its beauty, he convinced Wynn to come see the area. While on the lake with friend Paul Anka, Wynn noticed the nearby village of Bellagio, and spent half a day there. The village's Italian architecture inspired Wynn to scrap 10 months' worth of design work for Beau Rivage in favor of a Bellagio-themed resort. Wynn would later use the Beau Rivage name for another resort in Mississippi.

The Las Vegas project was revised and scaled back. Among the changes was a reduction in the size of the lake feature; Mirage Resorts determined that it would use too much water as originally planned. The hotel tower, originally planned at 49 stories, was also reduced. The design and planning process took a total of 28 months, dating to 1993. Wynn said "there was no need to rush the project. We wanted to get it right". Jerde's design firm spent a total of four years designing the project. Wynn's in-house design team, Atlandia Design, handled the interior. Aside from the Dunes, a Denny's restaurant was also demolished to make way for Bellagio.

Construction began on November 1, 1995, and the opening was initially scheduled for March 1998. Marnell Corrao Associates served as general contractor. The project's cost increased several times, in part because of new features being added. A shortage of skilled workers also resulted in rising labor costs. It was financed through various lenders. Finished at a cost of $1.6 billion, it was the most expensive resort ever built.

Wynn envisioned Bellagio as a five-star resort catering to tourists who typically visit places other than Las Vegas, such as Paris, London, or Venice. He said Bellagio would "redefine Las Vegas", describing it as the "most ambitious" and luxurious project ever attempted by Mirage Resorts. He also said it would be "the most romantic, delicious place ever built in the world", as well as the "greatest" and "most beautiful" hotel ever.

The property features a variety of trees. Before the opening, builders spent more than a year searching the western U.S. for mature Japanese privets, which are capable of withstanding the dry Las Vegas heat. A deal was reached to remove approximately 30 privets from the government center in Ventura County, California, and replant them at Bellagio, at a cost of nearly $10,000 per tree. The resort's pool area is surrounded by a Mediterranean garden that included nearly 300 pine trees, left over from the Dunes golf course.

=== Opening ===
The opening was highly anticipated, and crowd-control measures were in preparation months prior. Mirage Resorts launched a $10 million advertising campaign which included 60-second television commercials, featuring opera singer Andrea Bocelli.

A pre-opening VIP party took place on the night of October 15, 1998, with 1,800 in attendance, including Nevada governor Bob Miller. The public opening followed at 10:45 p.m. Crowds, waiting to enter the resort, reached an estimated 25,000 people. Within the first day, the resort had received more than 80,000 visitors.

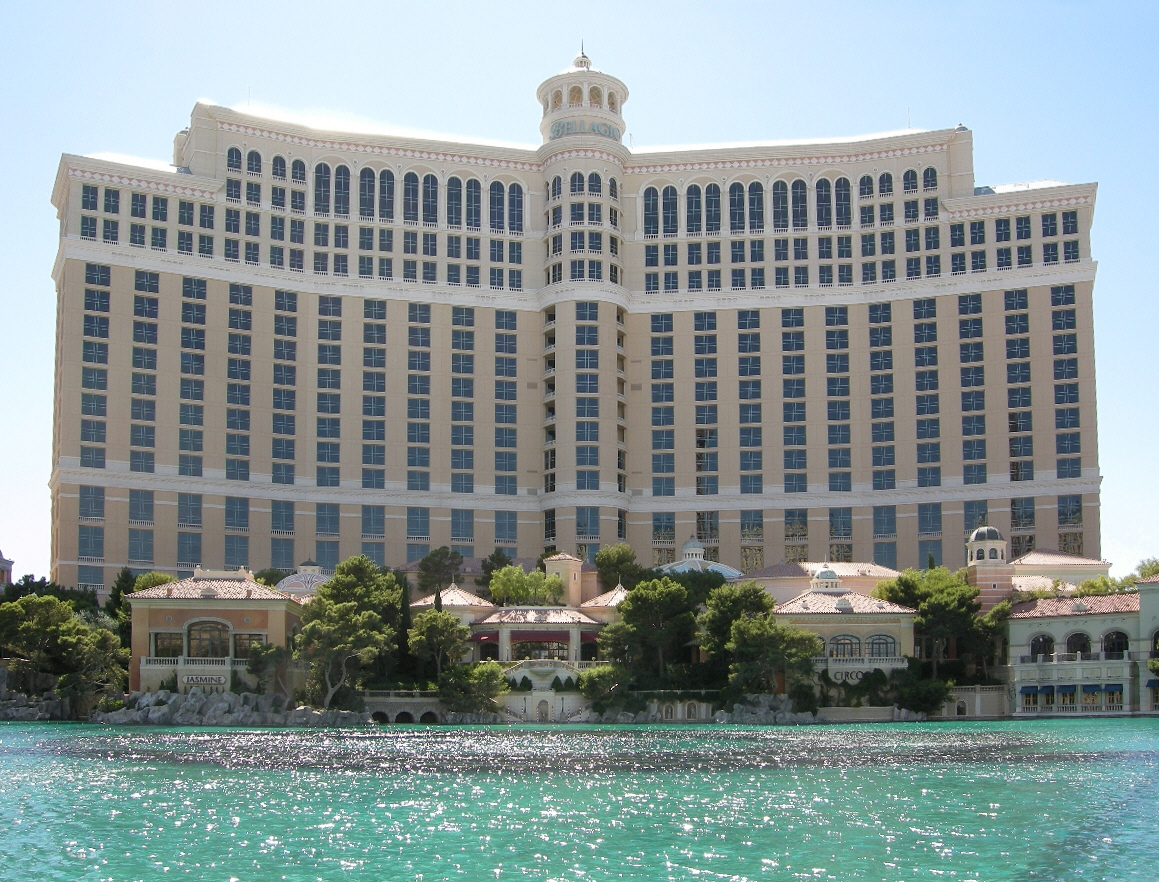
Bellagio hotel tower and lake

The property included 3,005 hotel rooms, a casino, and high-end shops and restaurants. The resort's main attraction was an 8.5-acre man-made lake, featuring a water show known as Fountains of Bellagio. Other attractions included a conservatory and the $285 million Bellagio Gallery of Fine Art. More than half of the resort's revenue was expected to come from non-gaming amenities. Bellagio employed 9,500 people, 3,200 of them coming from other properties also owned by Mirage Resorts. Casino executive Bobby Baldwin served as the resort's president.

Bellagio received positive reception. The level of luxury would eventually inspire other Las Vegas resorts to become more upscale. Las Vegas developer Irwin Molasky said, "In our lifetime we will never see another building or hotel with such beauty and grace". Brian Greenspun of the Las Vegas Sun said the opening "by all accounts, was a first for Las Vegas", stating that the resort exceeded expectations. The newspaper's Steve Friess later called the opening a "pivotal" turning point in Las Vegas history: "The opening of a genuine luxury resort with great food, shopping and amenities was the most important step toward saying to the world, 'Vegas isn't tacky anymore'". Residents of the Bellagio village reportedly found few similarities with the resort.

=== Ownership changes and expansion ===
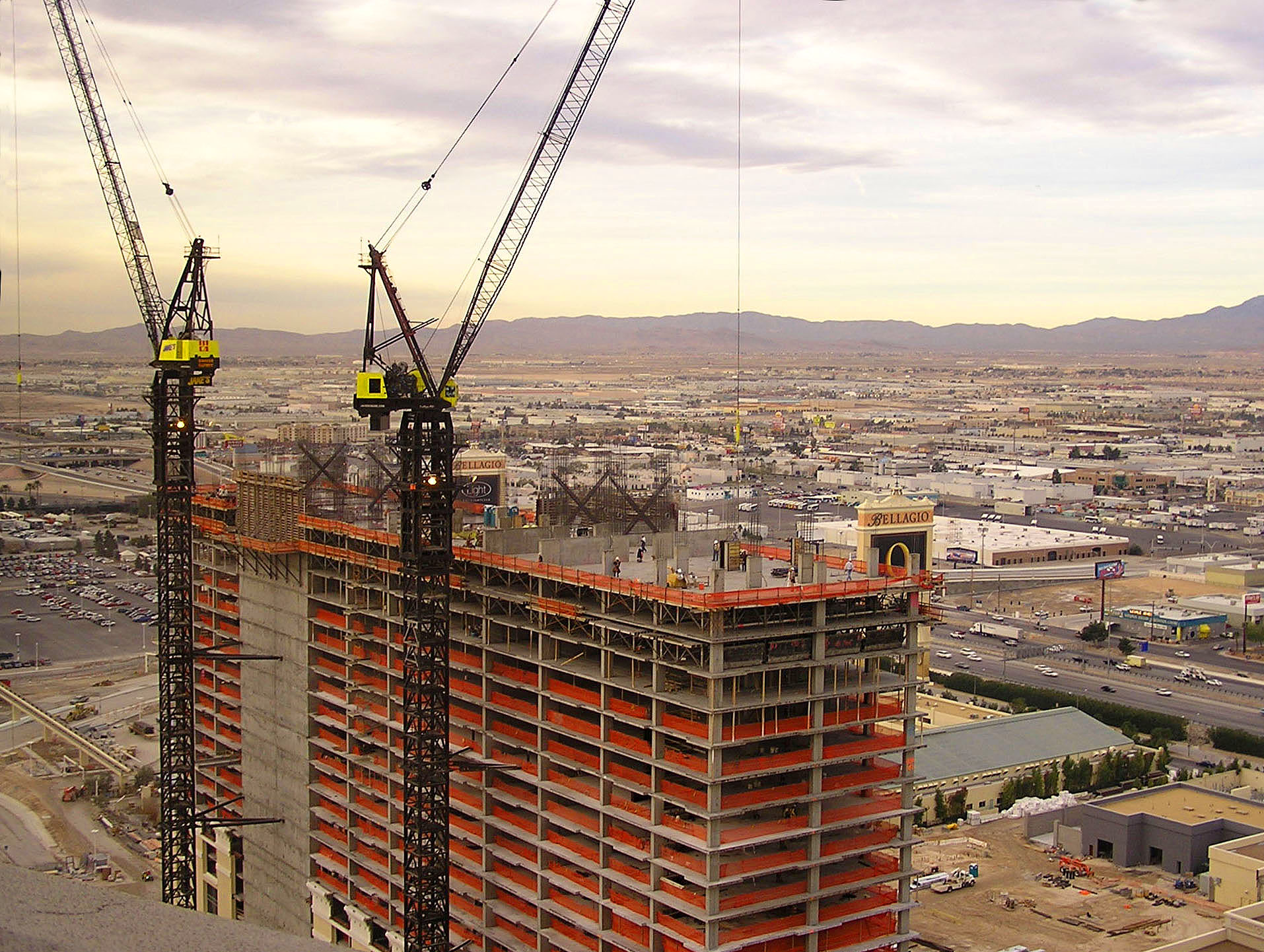
Spa Tower during construction (February 2004)

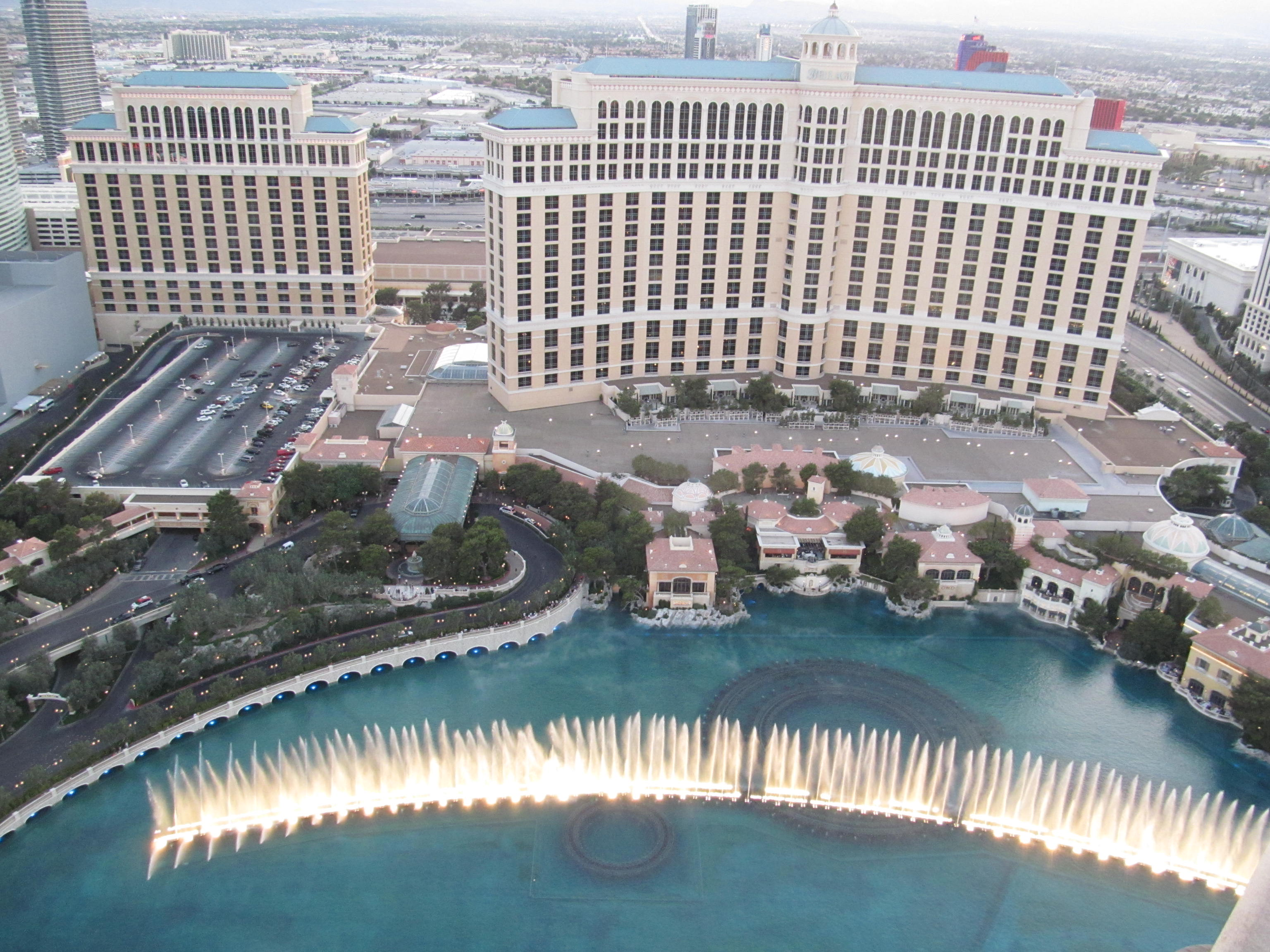
The Spa Tower, seen to the left of the main tower (2013)

When it opened, Bellagio's room rates averaged $200 a night, compared to $81 for most other Strip resorts. Early revenue was less than expected, with the resort making $260 million in cash flow during 1999, more than $40 million short of Wynn's predictions. Plans for a 1,300-room addition were put on hold in March 2000, while Mirage Resorts finalized a merger with MGM Grand Inc, owned by billionaire investor Kirk Kerkorian. The deal closed in May 2000, giving MGM Grand ownership of Bellagio. Wynn was not upset with the sale: "I've always been someone who focuses on the next project. The only part I ever enjoyed was the building, the design. I've always been the design guy". The company changed its name to MGM Mirage later that year, and Bellagio's cash flow improved under the new ownership, prompting reconsideration of the hotel expansion plan.

Plans for a second tower were confirmed in August 2002, as part of a $375 million expansion. The new Spa Tower would be built south of the main tower and would offer access to the spa. The expansion would also include an additional spa, salon, meeting and retail space, as well as a new restaurant. Marnell Corrao Associates returned as general contractor. Construction on the Spa Tower began in April 2003. It was topped off a year later, and opened on December 23, 2004. It added 928 rooms, for a total of 3,933. Convention space was also increased to 200,000 sq ft (19,000 m^{2}). The resort hired 1,400 new employees for the expanded facilities, bringing the total to 10,000.

By 2004, Bellagio was the most profitable hotel-casino in Las Vegas. In 2012, MGM and Suning Real Estate announced plans to expand the Bellagio name with a 200-room hotel in Shanghai, which eventually opened in 2018. Twenty years after its opening, Bellagio remained one of the most popular resorts on the Las Vegas Strip.

In October 2019, MGM Resorts announced it would sell Bellagio to Blackstone Inc. for $4.25 billion. Through the deal, the two companies would form a joint venture that would lease Bellagio back to MGM Resorts for an annual rent of $245 million. The sale was completed in November 2019. Under the deal, MGM acquired a five-percent ownership stake in the venture and continued to operate the resort through the lease.

In July 2023, MGM Resorts announced an agreement with Marriott International to bring its properties within Marriott's international reservations system and its Bonvoy loyalty program. The new partnership, which began in 2024, has Bellagio marketed within The Luxury Collection division of Marriott as Bellagio, a Luxury Collection Resort & Casino, Las Vegas. In August 2023, Blackstone sold a 21.9-percent stake in the resort to Realty Income for $950 million.

== Features ==
=== Casino ===
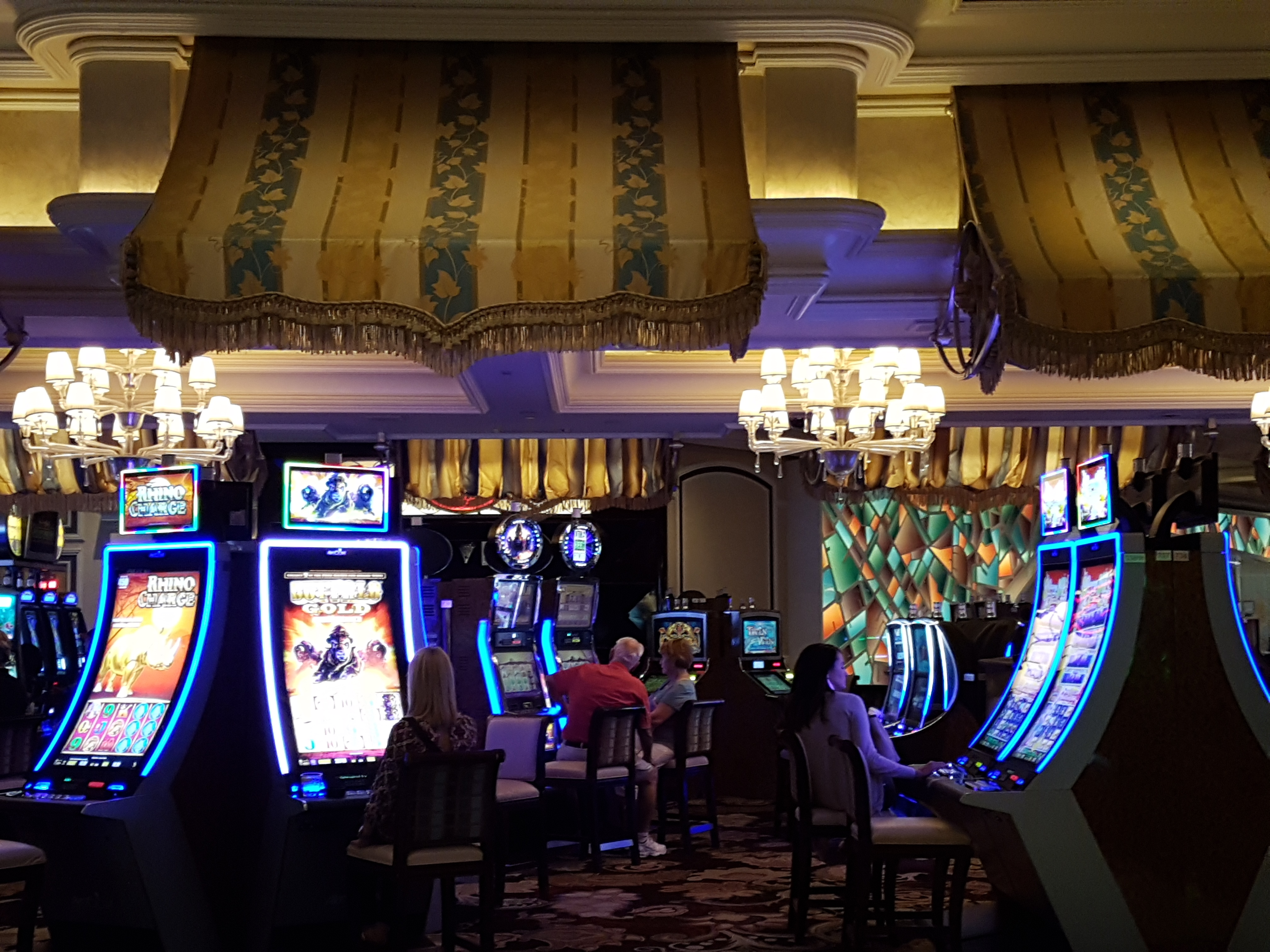
Casino area

Bellagio's casino is 156,000 sq ft (14,500 m^{2}). Upon opening, it included 2,700 slot machines and 173 table games. Signage above slot machines was kept to a minimum, as Wynn wanted the resort's architecture to be the primary focus. As of 2003, gaming made up less than half of the resort's revenue. The poker room was expanded in 2004, as the game saw a rise in popularity.

The casino includes a high-limit poker area, originally known as Bobby's Room. It was named after Bellagio president and longtime MGM executive Bobby Baldwin. As of 2018, the minimum buy-in was $20,000. It was the most popular high-limit poker room in Las Vegas, until the nearby Aria resort opened in 2009. The Aria's poker room offered players a high-end alternative to Bobby's Room. In October 2020, MGM quietly renamed it the Legends Room, two years after Baldwin left the company.

In 2002, the casino launched a poker tournament series. The casino also hosts the annual WPT Five Diamond World Poker Classic, and the Five-Star World Poker Classic.

In 2013, Bellagio introduced a private 2,600 sq ft (240 m^{2}) casino room known as Villa Privé, reserved for high rollers.

=== Hotel ===
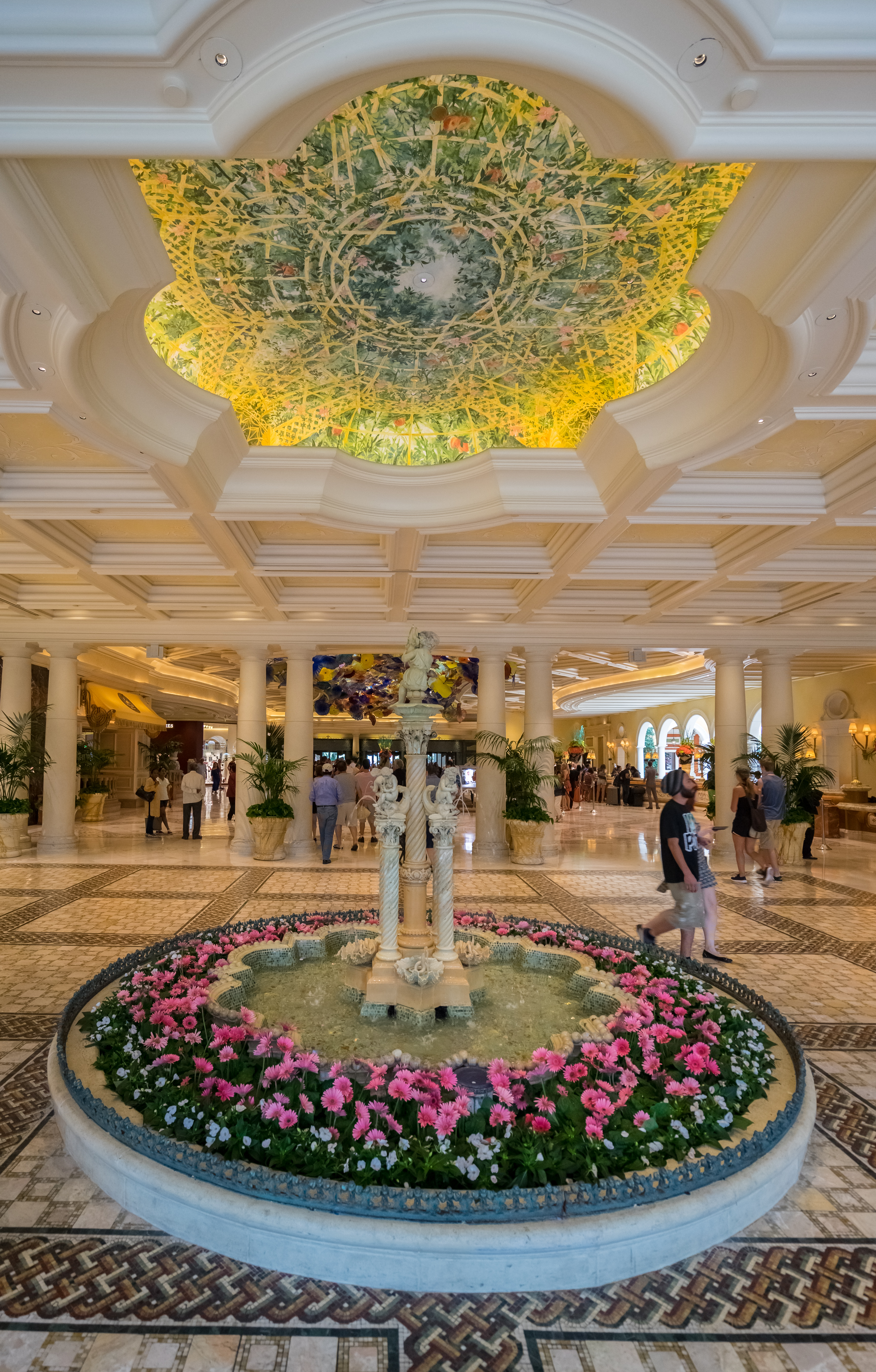
19th century fountain in the hotel lobby

The Bellagio hotel has 3,933 rooms. It originally opened with 3,005 rooms, including 401 suites. A renovation of the main tower rooms took place in 2003. The Spa Tower, finished a year later, added 928 rooms, bringing the resort to its current number. The original tower is 36 stories, while the Spa Tower contains 33.

The hotel's suites, as well as the rooms in the Spa Tower, were renovated in 2007. Rooms in the main tower received a six-month, $70 million renovation in 2011. A $40 million renovation of the Spa Tower rooms began in 2012 and concluded the following year. From 2014 to 2015, renovations took place on the main tower suites. It was the final phase of the $165 million remodeling project that began in 2011. Another renovation of the main tower rooms took place during 2021, and a $110 million renovation of the Spa Tower is scheduled for completion by October 2023.

The 4,000 sq ft (370 m^{2}) Chairman Suite includes an indoor garden, a home theater system, several fireplaces, a bar, and fulltime butler service.

A restored 19th century fountain sits in the hotel lobby, near the Conservatory. In 2015, a sculpture representing Earth's elements was placed outside the main hotel entrance. It was created by artist Masatoshi Izumi, who hand-carved it out of four basalt stones, each one weighing at least 17,000 pounds.

=== Nightclubs and bars ===
An upscale nightclub, known as Light, was opened in December 2001. It was owned by Chris and Keith Barish, along with partner Andrew Sasson. It was inspired by a New York nightclub of the same name. The Las Vegas location became popular among celebrities. Light closed in September 2007, and was replaced by a new upscale nightclub known as The Bank. It was operated by Sasson's company, The Light Group. The 6,600 sq ft (610 m^{2}) club included two bars and three resident DJs. It was popular among tourists, and also attracted locals with various promotions and contests. It eventually closed in 2018.

In March 2011, SBE Entertainment Group announced that it would bring its Hyde Lounge nightclub brand to the resort, taking the place of Fontana Bar. Hyde Bellagio opened on December 31, 2011. The 10,000 sq ft (930 m^{2}) space featured 40 tables and capacity for 714 people. It included outdoor seating overlooking the resort's fountains. Hyde Bellagio closed in July 2019, and was replaced by the Mayfair Supper Club.

In February 2012, The Light Group opened Lily Bar & Lounge, which also served as a nightclub. The resort's bars are served by a pump room containing 1,800 bottles of alcohol. The alcohol travels distances ranging from 1,000 to 10,000 feet before reaching any one of the resort's 53 bars.

=== Restaurants ===
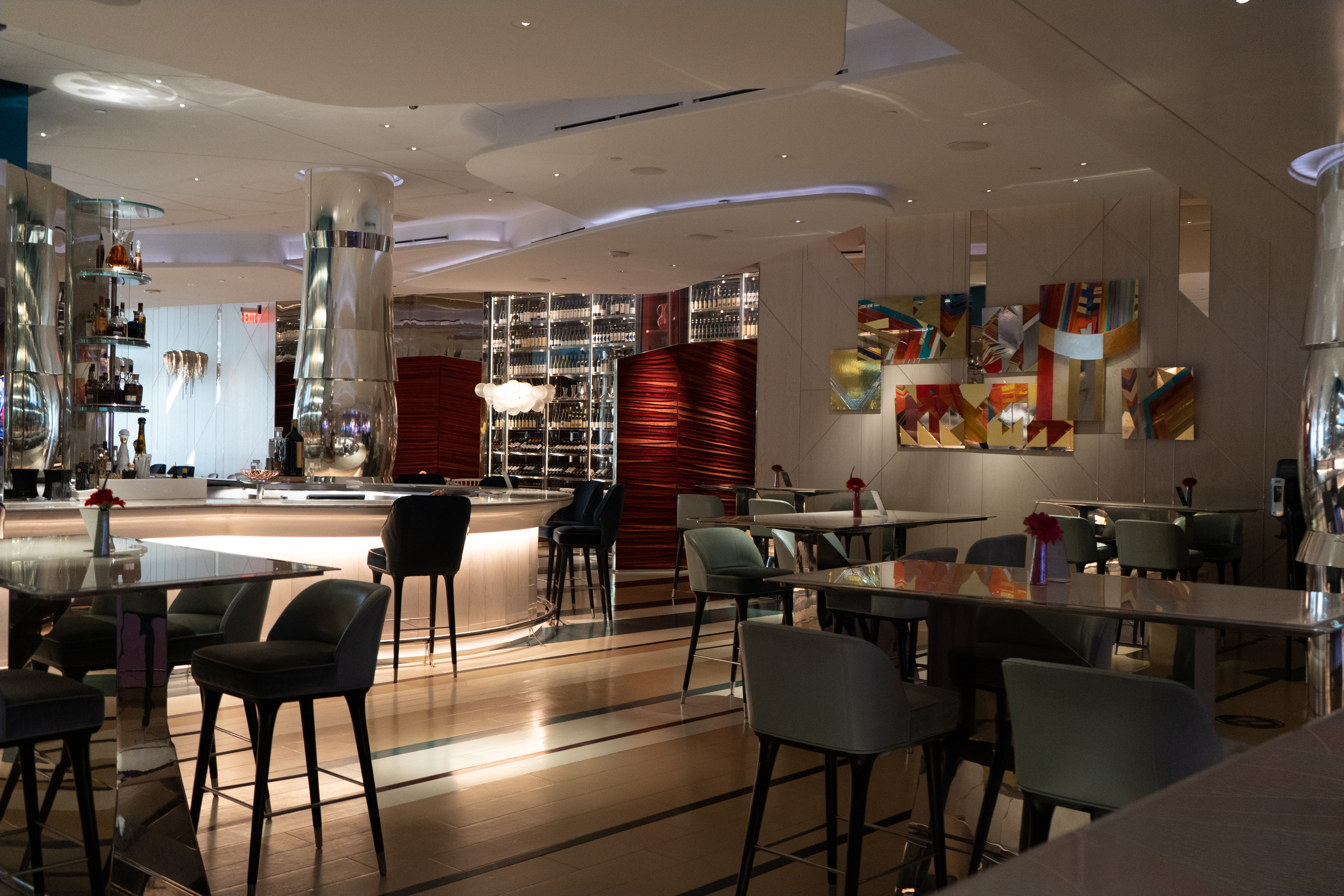
Michael Mina restaurant

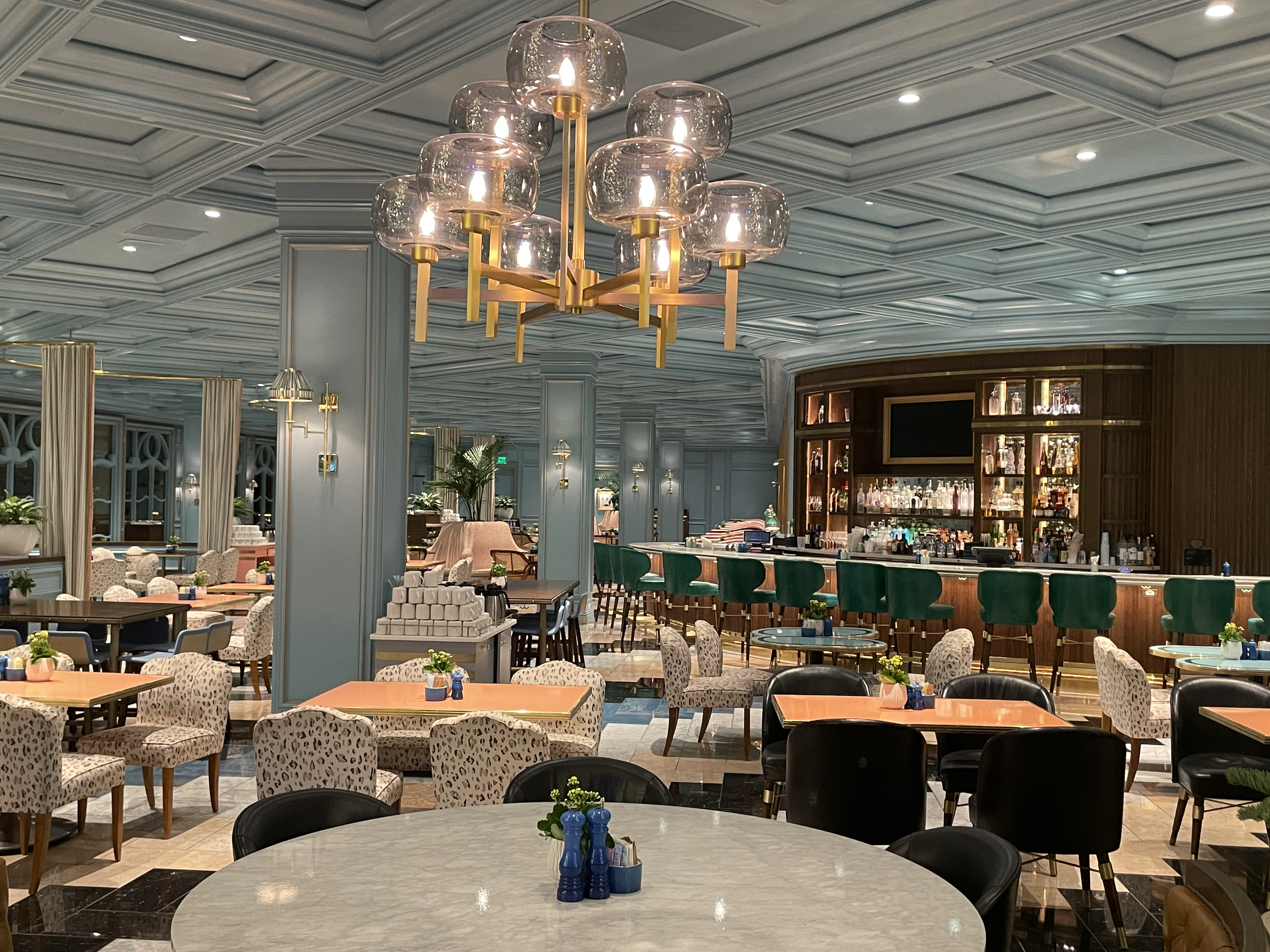
Sadelle's

Bellagio opened with 16 eateries, some of them overseen by award-winning chefs. Picasso was a French restaurant by chef Julian Serrano. Paintings by Pablo Picasso adorned the restaurant's walls. Chef Todd English opened Olives, which served Mediterranean food and was named after a popular restaurant he opened in Boston. The resort also included Circo and Le Cirque, both owned by the Maccioni family and inspired by New York restaurants of the same name. Circo was an Italian restaurant, while Le Cirque offers French food and features an upscale circus theme.

Other restaurants included the 500-seat Buffet at Bellagio; Prime, a steakhouse by chef Jean-Georges Vongerichten; Aqua, a 150-seat seafood restaurant originally from San Francisco, overseen by chef Michael Mina; and the 24-hour Bellagio Cafe. Several restaurants included patios overlooking the Bellagio lake.

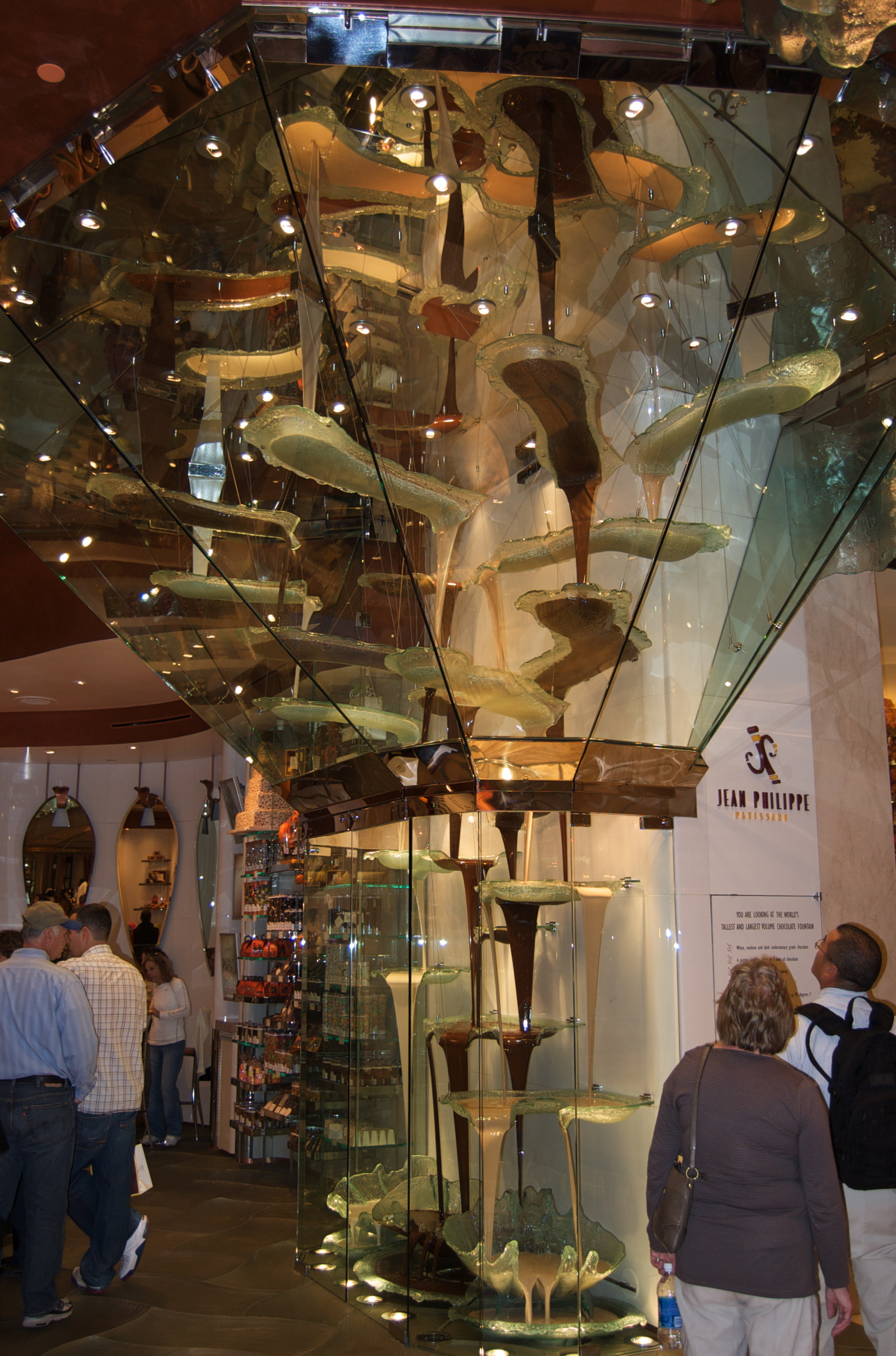
World's largest chocolate fountain

In 2004, Aqua was renamed Michael Mina after its chef. A new restaurant, Sensi, opened later that year as part of the Spa Tower. Jean-Philippe Maury also opened a pâtisserie which includes the world's largest chocolate fountain, standing 27 feet.

Fifteen years after the resort's opening, most of the original restaurants remained popular. Circo closed in 2014, and was replaced a year later by Lago, a new restaurant from chef Serrano. The restaurant serves Italian food, and features an Italian Futurism design. Snacks, a popular eatery among gamblers, was remodeled in 2015.

Chef Roy Ellamar began overseeing Sensi in 2011. The restaurant closed in 2015, and was replaced by Ellamar's new restaurant Harvest, a health-conscious eatery with an emphasis on fresh ingredients. Olives closed in early 2018, and was replaced by Spago, a restaurant by Wolfgang Puck. Sadelle's, a popular Manhattan restaurant, opened a Las Vegas location at Bellagio in 2019, replacing the cafe.

The Mayfair Supper Club, a restaurant offering live entertainment, opened on December 31, 2019. It overlooks the Bellagio fountains. Le Cirque closed in March 2020, amid the COVID-19 pandemic, and eventually reopened in October 2021.

The resort includes an employee dining hall known as Mangia, which functions as a buffet and feeds thousands of workers daily. An herb garden, located on the Bellagio's roof, supplies some of the resort's restaurants.

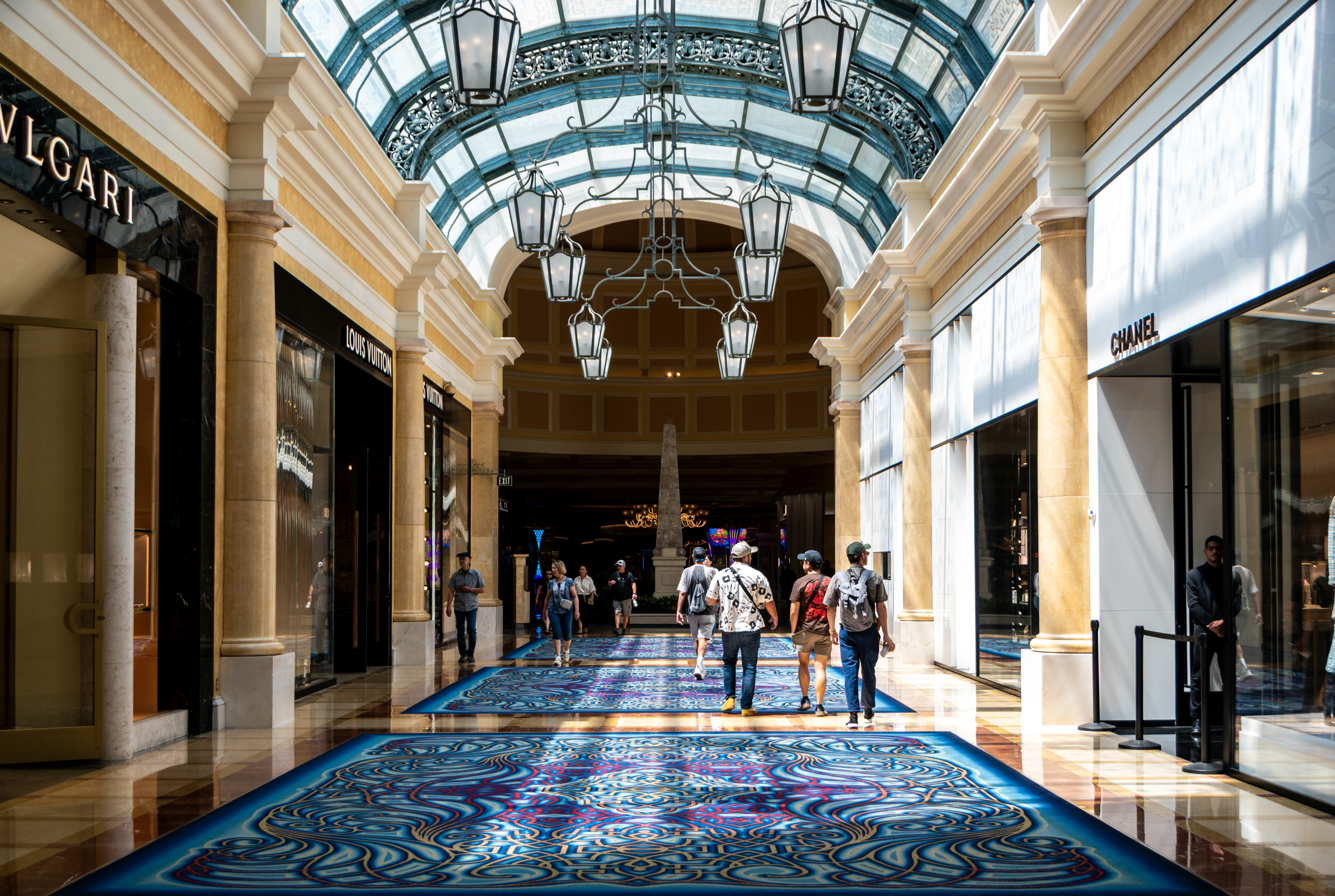
Retail space leading into the casino

=== Retail ===
Since its opening, the resort has included a high-end retail area known as Via Bellagio. Retailers include Armani, Chanel, Fred Leighton, Gucci, Hermès, Prada, and Tiffany & Co. It was the first time that such retailers had opened in Las Vegas, as Via Bellagio was the city's first retail center focused on luxury brands. Additional retail space was added in the 2004 expansion.

== Attractions ==
=== Fountains of Bellagio ===
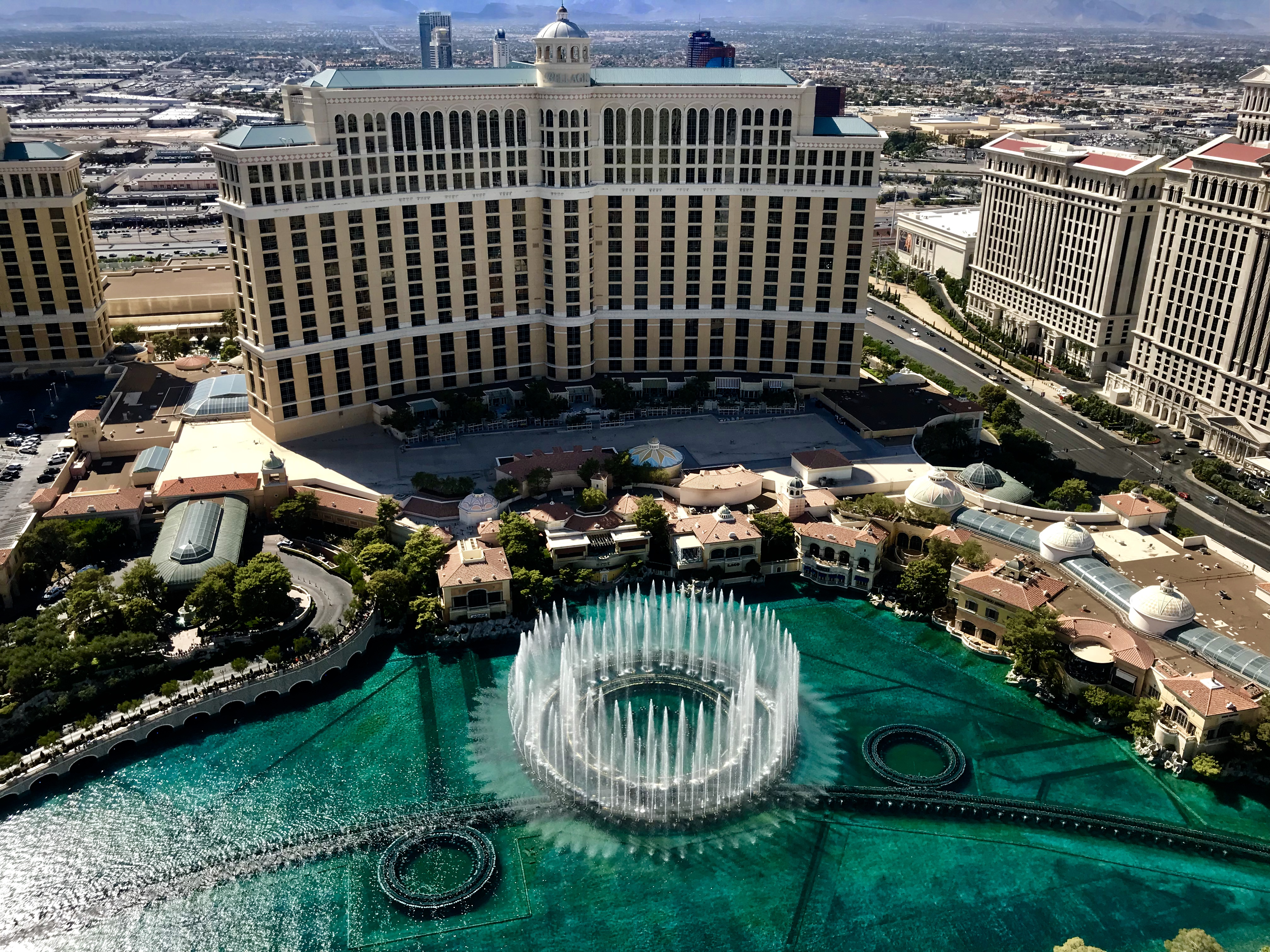
Bellagio's fountain show

Fountains of Bellagio is a free musical fountain show performed in the resort's 8.5-acre lake. Each show is choreographed to a specific song or track, coming from a variety of musical genres. The fountains dance along to match the rhythm of the music, and water shoots as high as 460 feet. The fountains are a popular attraction, and among the most photographed places in the United States. Stages are occasionally built on the lake to host events, such as musical performances and a portion of the 2022 NFL draft. Bellagio has hosted over 240,000 fountain shows as of October 2018.

The Fountains of Bellagio have experienced interruptions throughout their operation. These include a three-day power outage in 2004 and a temporary closure in March 2020 due to the COVID-19 pandemic. Technical problems have rarely caused cancellations, with only five reported by 2005. In 2012, based on tourist reviews, TripAdvisor recognized the Fountains of Bellagio as one of the "most talked about attractions" globally. It was one of 16 attractions featured on the list. TripAdvisor's 2013 Travelers' Choice awards bestowed high honors upon the Fountains of Bellagio, naming it the top tourist attraction in the U.S. and placing it among the top 12 globally.

=== Conservatory and botanical gardens ===
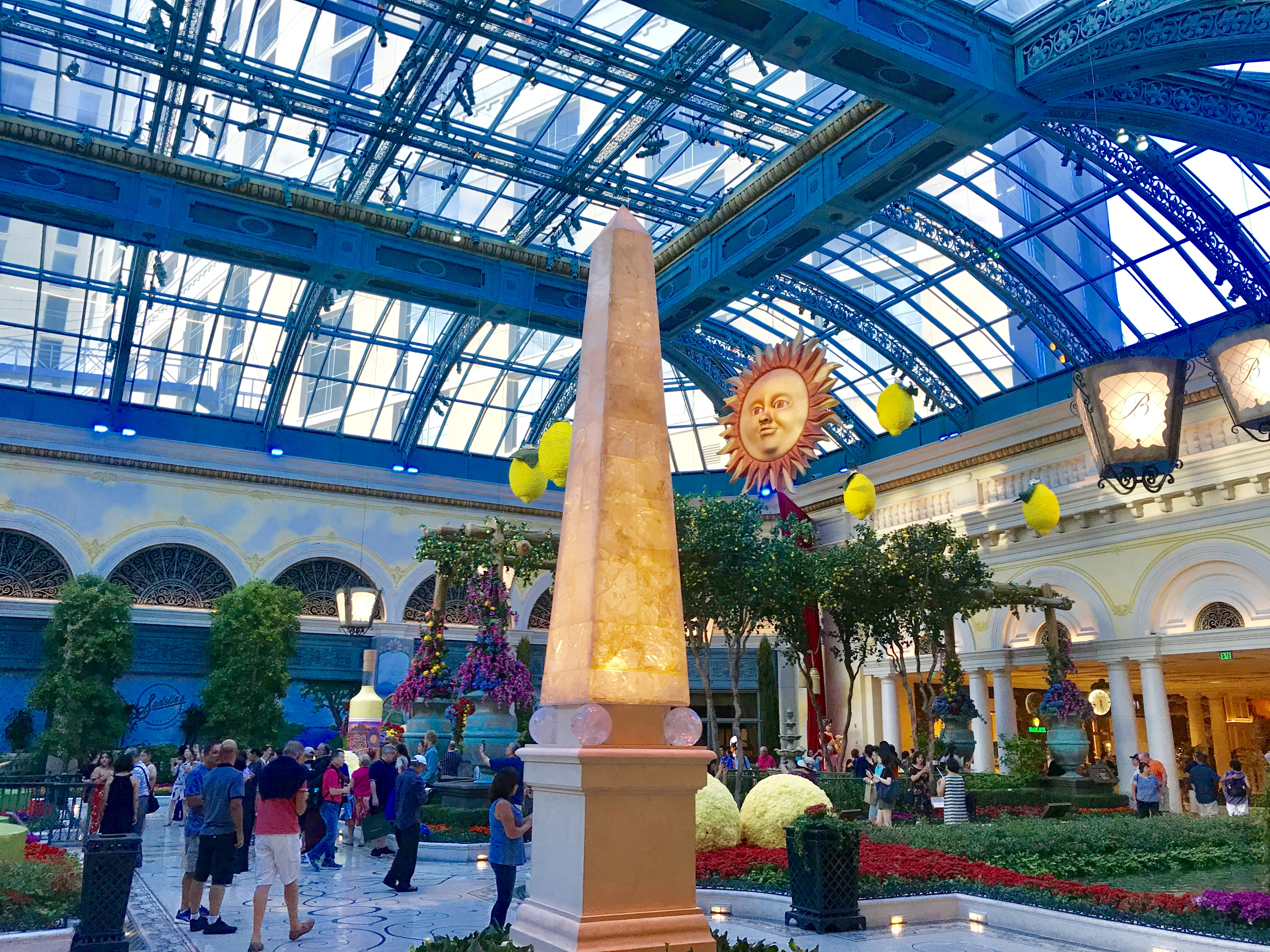
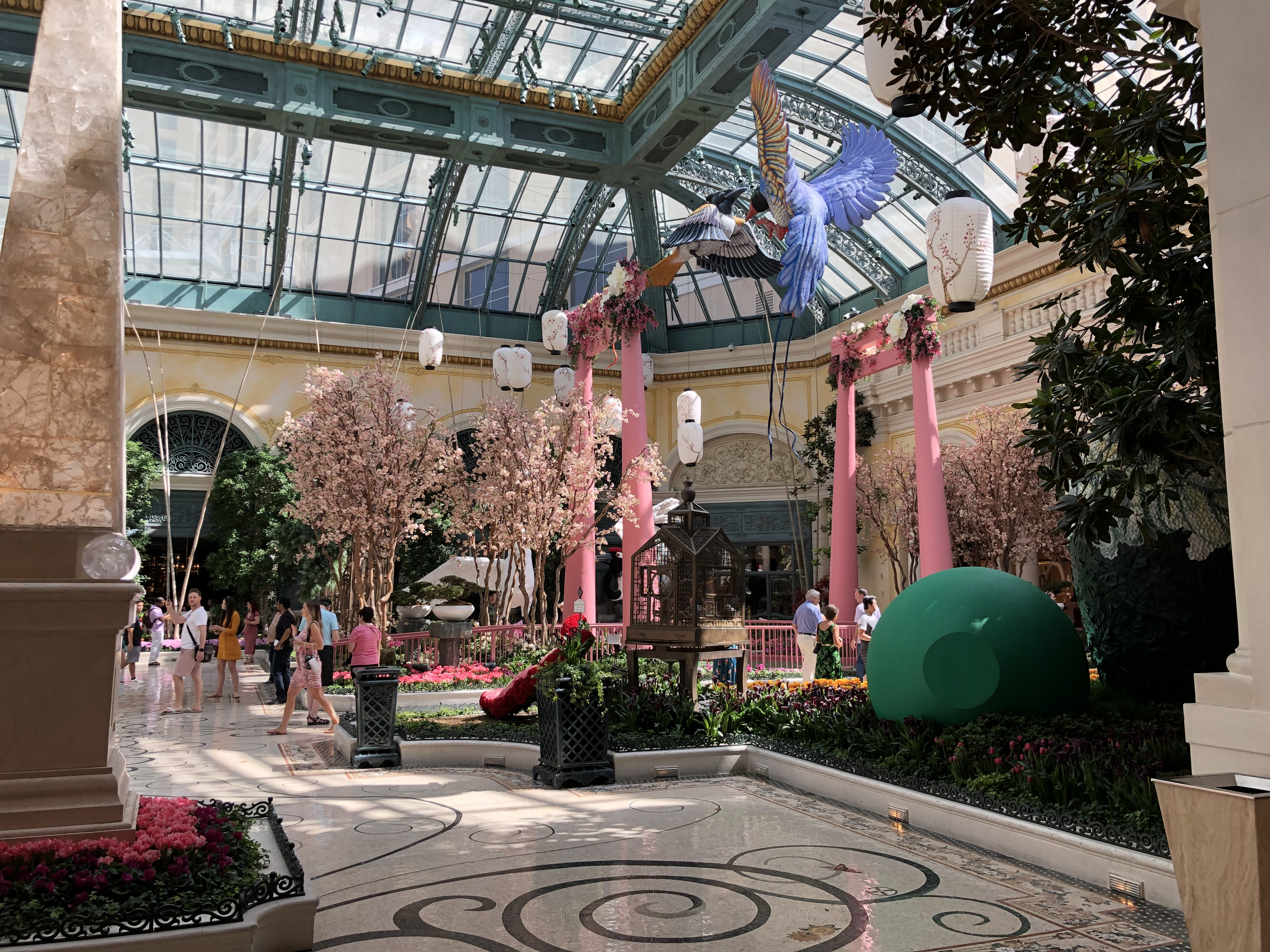
Seasonal displays

The resort contains a 13,500 sq ft (1,250 m^{2}) conservatory and botanical gardens. It is located next to the hotel's lobby and is open free to the public. It receives an average of 20,000 visitors daily. The Conservatory was originally planned as an outdoor garden.

There are five seasonal themes that the Conservatory undergoes: Chinese New Year, spring, summer, fall, and winter. From January to mid-March, the Conservatory celebrates the Chinese New Year with a display dominated by flowers bromeliads and orchids, as well as the animal of that particular year that the Chinese zodiac celebrates. The theme then changes over to the spring display, which lasts until May, and usually features a butterfly house as well as many varieties of tropical flowers.

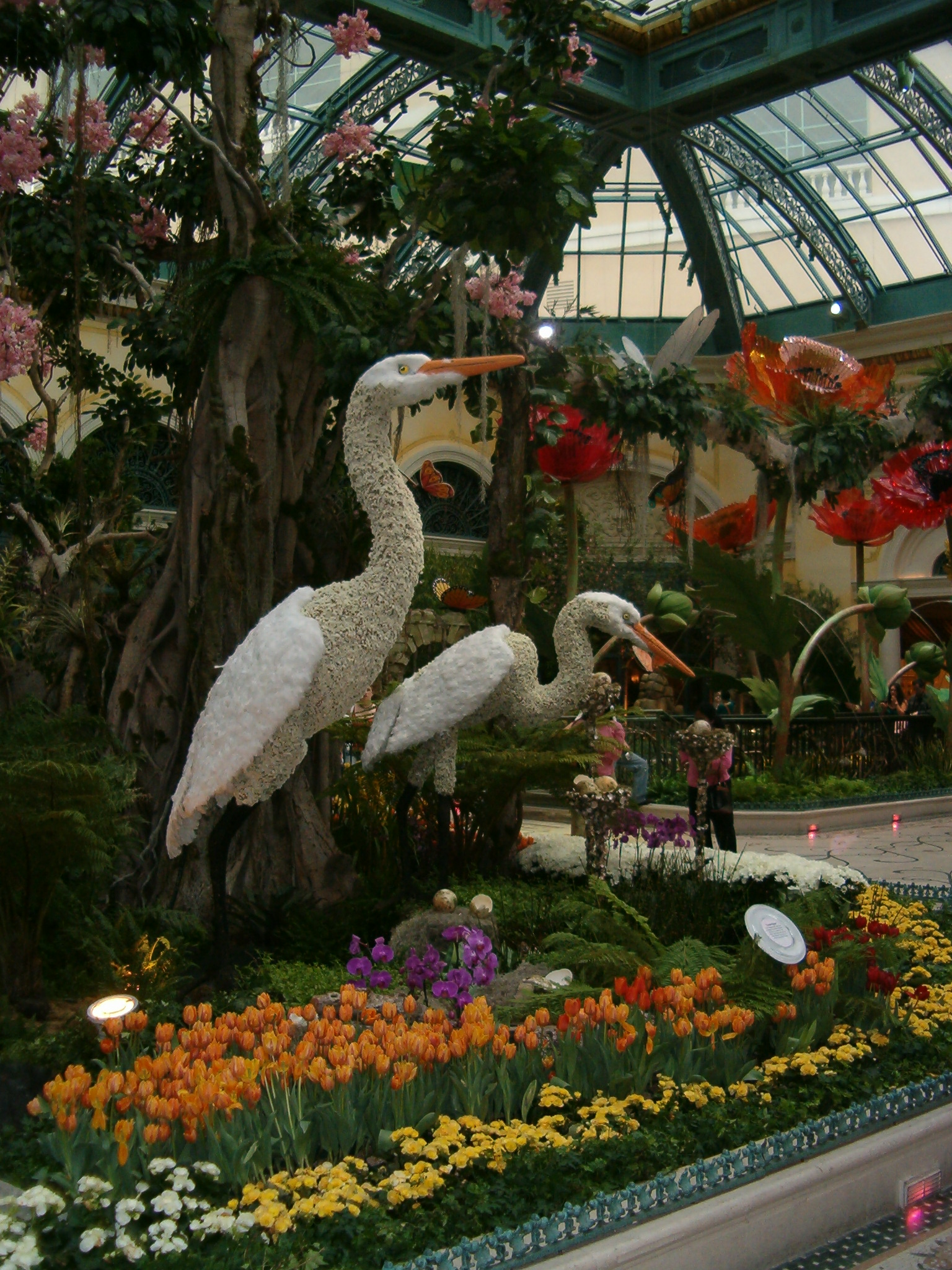
Summer display

During Memorial Day weekend, Bellagio then switches over to its all-American summer display, featuring a large recreation of the Liberty Bell, as well as several American flags throughout the Conservatory. The summer display is usually very patriotic featuring a lot of red, white, and blue, and is dominated by hydrangeas. From late September until Thanksgiving weekend, the Conservatory puts on its autumn display featuring several varieties of chrysanthemum and several large pumpkins. After Thanksgiving, the Conservatory switches to its winter holiday display, which is dominated by a large centerpiece Christmas Tree and several varieties of poinsettia. A life-sized candy village, which took months to create, was introduced for the 2012 Christmas display. Throughout the year, the colorful displays are decorated with many fragrant flowers and usually contain fountains.

Each seasonal display costs about $1 million to create. Props are put into storage for future use. Planning for each season is done in advance, and each display design is carried out by more than 100 workers over the course of several days. The Conservatory uses thousands of plants and flowers for its displays each year. As of 2018, the Conservatory had used six million plants across 100 displays, and had received 150 million visitors. In 2022, the resort introduced the Garden Table, a dining experience with seating alongside the conservatory attractions.

=== Bellagio Gallery of Fine Art ===
In addition to the numerous works of art found throughout the public areas of the resort, the property also includes the Bellagio Gallery of Fine Art. It opened along with the resort, originally to showcase art from Wynn's private collection, as well as art owned by Mirage Resorts. Following the property's ownership change in 2000, the gallery became a rotating exhibition space, hosting art collections loaned from museums.

=== Fiori di Como ===
A large art piece hangs from the ceiling of the hotel lobby, measuring approximately 2,000 sq ft (190 m^{2}) and representing flowers of various colors. It is a popular attraction and free to view. Known as Fiori di Como ("Flowers of Como"), it was created by glass artist Dale Chihuly. Wynn hired him to create an art piece for the resort, but it would take six months before they settled on an idea. According to Wynn's wife Elaine, "We went over to Dale's house where he had put a glass art installation at the bottom of his lap pool. And I said to him, 'I want that in my ceiling in the Bellagio lobby.' So that's how we got that".

A total of two years was spent working on Fiori di Como, which turned out larger than Chihuly had anticipated: "Every time, Steve (Wynn) saw it, he wanted more". Because the sculpture would hang in Las Vegas, Chihuly took a less-restrained approach in creating it: "I thought it would be a good opportunity to use a lot of color. I thought I could be a little bit more exuberant". Metal oxides were used during the glass-making process to give the sculpture its colors. Fiori di Como includes more than 2,100 pieces of colored glass. The sculpture measures 65 feet by 29 feet, and weighs more than 40,000 pounds. It is supported by a 10,000-pound steel armature.

Fiori di Como is the world's largest glass sculpture, and it popularized Chihuly among the general public. The cost to create the sculpture has never been revealed, although it reportedly ranges from $1 million to $10 million. As of 2017, it is estimated to be worth at least $8 million. Fiori di Como garnered positive feedback from guests, prompting Chihuly and Bellagio to partner and open a store in 2001, in the resort's Conservatory. The store sold artwork by Chihuly, including individual flower-shaped art pieces inspired by Fiori di Como. Other items included books and videos about Chihuly.

== Live entertainment ==
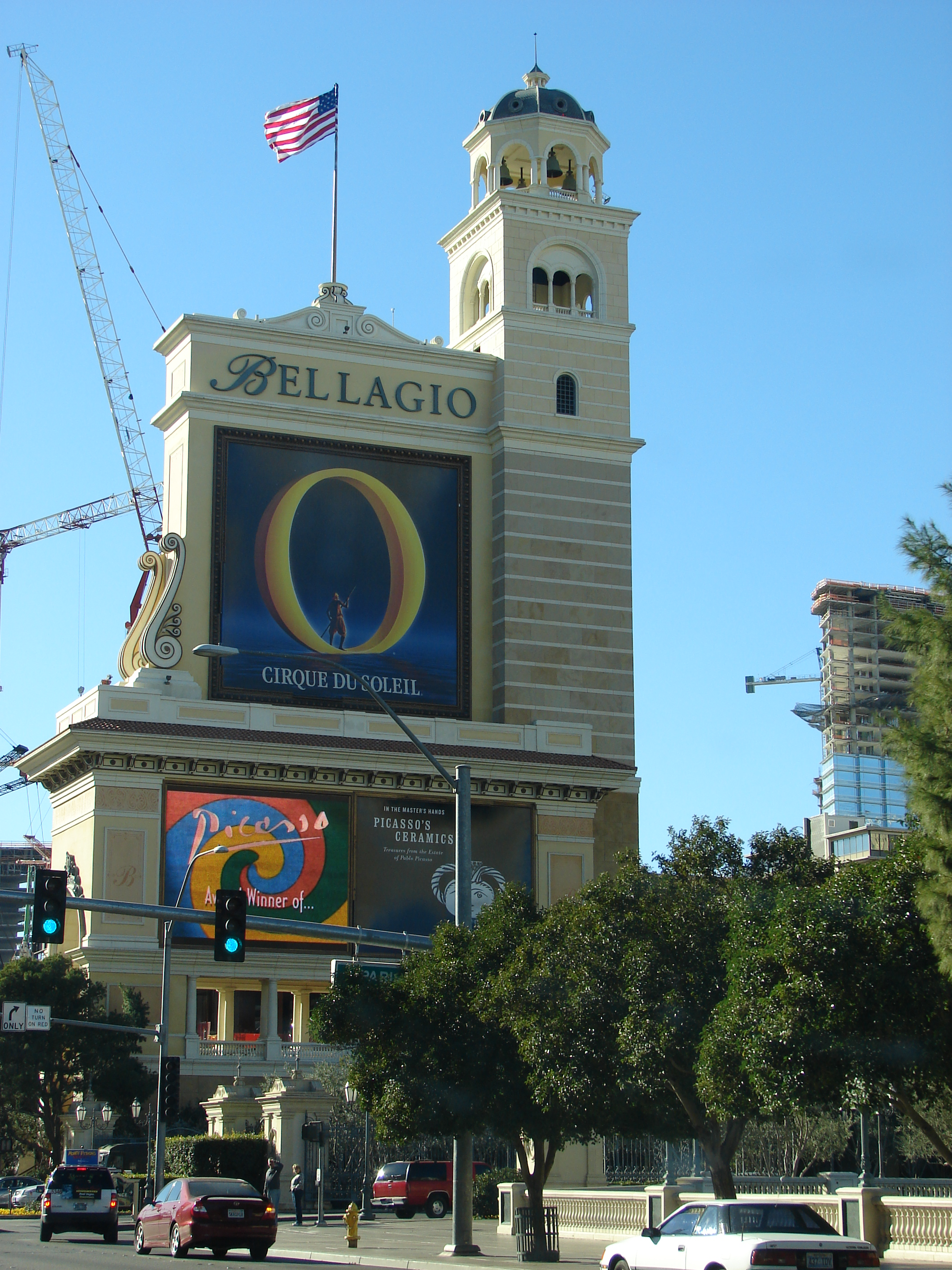
Sign on the Las Vegas Strip advertising O

Wynn hired talent manager Sandy Gallin to oversee live entertainment at the resort. Upon opening, the casino included several performance venues, such as the 250-seat Fontana lounge, and the 70-seat Allegro lounge. Early on, the Fontana hosted acts such as Michael Feinstein and Loston Harris.

Since the Bellagio opened, it has featured Cirque du Soleil's water-themed show O. It is performed in an 1,800-seat opera house, and makes use of a mini lake which serves as the stage. The show was created at a cost of approximately $100 million, making it the most expensive in Las Vegas history up to that point.

Cheval, a horse-themed show, was performed in a tent next to the resort in the early 2000s. It was created by Gilles Ste-Croix, who helped create O.

== Accolades ==
Bellagio is a member of The Leading Hotels of the World, and various organizations have ranked the resort highly. By 2001, it had achieved a four-star rating from Mobil Travel Guide. That year, it became the first hotel-casino to win the AAA Five Diamond Award. It was also the second Las Vegas hotel to win the award, after the Four Seasons in 1999. In 2010, Bellagio won its 10th consecutive Five Diamond Award, the first Strip resort to do so. As of 2020, it had won the Five Diamond Award 18 consecutive times.

Bellagio placed eighth in the 2003 Zagat Survey of U.S. hotel resorts, while its restaurants ranked 12th in the category of top dining. Bellagio has also made the Condé Nast Traveler Gold List numerous times, beginning in 2005. A 2005 study by Majestic Research, polling more than 400 out-of-state residents, found Bellagio to be the favorite resort among tourists, with 18 percent support. Another study polled tourists who visited Las Vegas in 2005, and Bellagio was named the city's top "must-see" resort, while the fountains were named best "must-see" attraction. In 2010, Travel + Leisure ranked it 31st on a list of top hotels in large U.S. and Canadian cities. Travelocity ranked it in sixth place in a 2011 list of top 10 Las Vegas hotels, based on guest reviews.

The resort's Picasso restaurant has also been critically acclaimed, receiving the AAA Five Diamond and Mobil Five-Star awards by the end of 2001. In 2010, the restaurant won its 10th Five Diamond Award, while Le Cirque won its 8th. Bellagio is the only hotel in the United States to have two Five Diamond restaurants.

== Incidents ==
=== Power outages ===
A resort-wide power outage occurred around 2:00 a.m. on April 11, 2004, leaving only emergency lights still working. One of the main power lines was compromised, which led to the failure of other lines, resulting in the outage. Power had to be shut down completely so that thousands of feet of cable could be replaced. Guests were relocated to other hotels. The hotel and casino reopened on April 14, 2004, and other areas of the resort were reopened over the next few days. A preliminary investigation by the county found that the main power line failed because of premature deterioration, the cause for which remained unknown.

A partial power outage occurred on December 31, 2011, shutting down the resort's buffet and several hundred hotel rooms in the main tower's west wing. Another partial outage occurred in March 2018, after leaking water made contact with an electrical panel. The six-hour outage affected the buffet, a performance theater, parts of the sportsbook, and certain elevators.

=== Robberies ===
Several robberies have occurred at the Bellagio. In June 2000, three men stole $160,000 in cash and casino chips, and were subsequently apprehended. The Bellagio heist was one in a series of casino robberies committed by the men.

In December 2010, a helmet-wearing man robbed $1.5 million in chips from a craps table, with some chips worth $25,000 each. Confidential safeguards made it unlikely that the thief would be able to cash in the chips without getting caught. Furthermore, MGM announced after the robbery that it would discontinue the $25,000 chips within four months. The thief, son of a Las Vegas judge, was arrested in February 2011, after arranging to sell $25,000 chips to an undercover police officer. Approximately $793,000 in chips remained unaccounted for, most of them $25,000 chips. The robber pled guilty as part of a plea deal, and was sentenced to 3 to 11 years.

In July 2014, a man robbed the cashier cage of $43,500, using a BB gun. He was arrested the next day, after spending roughly half of the money on prostitutes and a shopping spree. He was found incompetent to stand trial.

On an early morning in March 2017, men wearing animal-themed masks broke into a jewelry store at the resort, prompting a police lockdown of the casino and parking garage. One of the suspects was apprehended, while three others remained at large.

Another robbery occurred later in 2017, when a man stole money from a poker cage. He returned to rob the cage in March 2019, and a shootout occurred outside the resort between him and police as he tried to escape. He was shot and killed.

=== Fires ===
On the morning of September 23, 2008, a mattress fire prompted the brief evacuation of the 26th floor, as well as portions of the 25th and 27th floors. One guest suffered minor burns, and others were treated for smoke inhalation and released shortly afterwards.

On the night of April 13, 2017, the roof of the resort's retail section caught fire, forcing an evacuation of the area. The rest of the resort was unaffected, and the fire was put out within a half-hour. It caused up to $450,000 in damage, mostly above a Starbucks. The fire was caused by a faulty exterior light fixture.

== In popular culture ==
Bellagio serves as the central setting for the 2001 film Ocean's Eleven, in which a group of thieves conspire to rob its vault. The film features various areas of the property. A staircase descended by character Tess Ocean (Julia Roberts) would later be removed to make way for the Spa Tower.

The Bellagio is depicted in the 2007 film Lucky You. The film is set in 2003, but the resort's poker room had been renovated since then, prompting the filmmakers to construct a replica of the original room on a soundstage in Los Angeles.

The resort's fountains have appeared in numerous films.

== Gallery ==
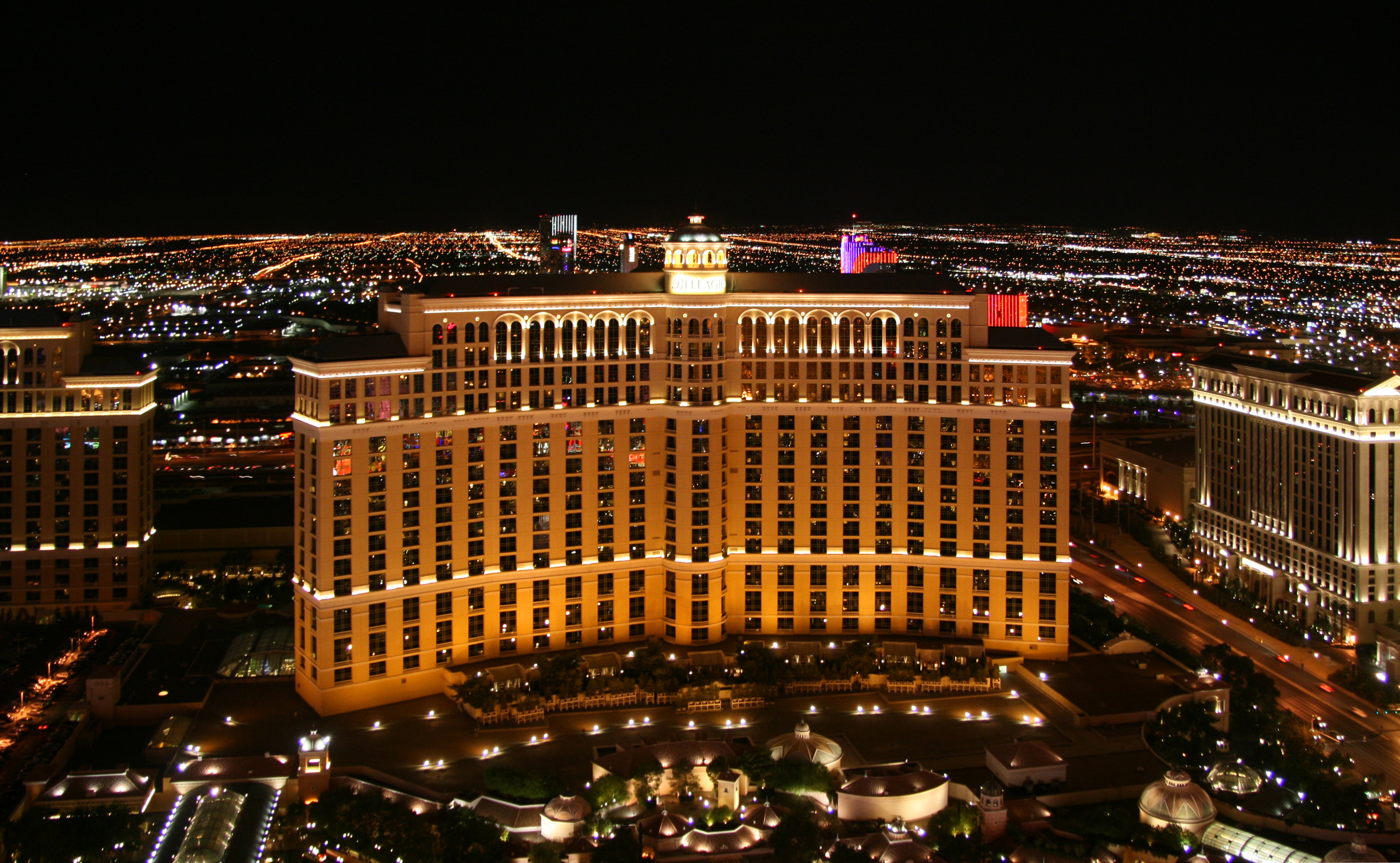
Main tower at night

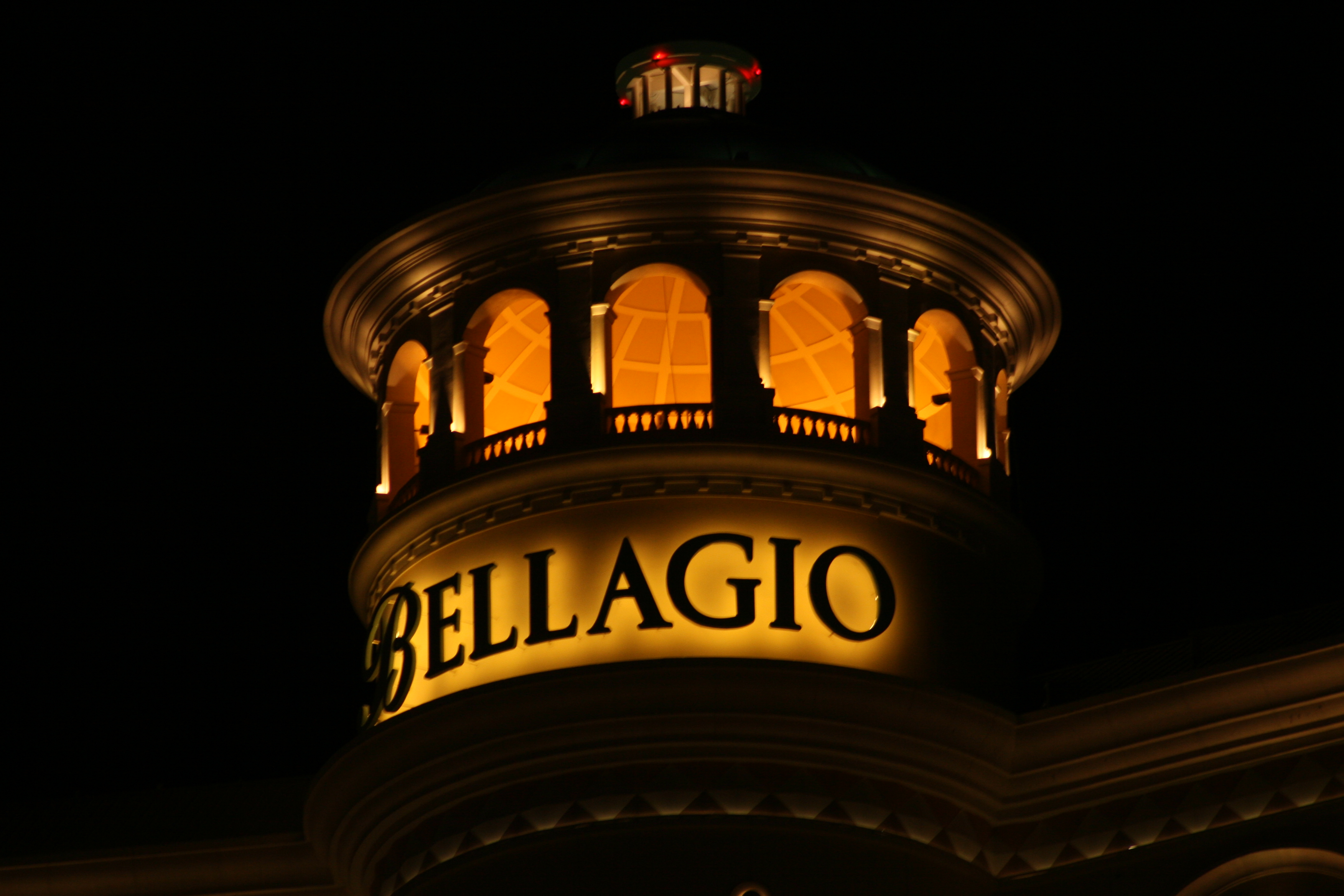
Top of the main tower

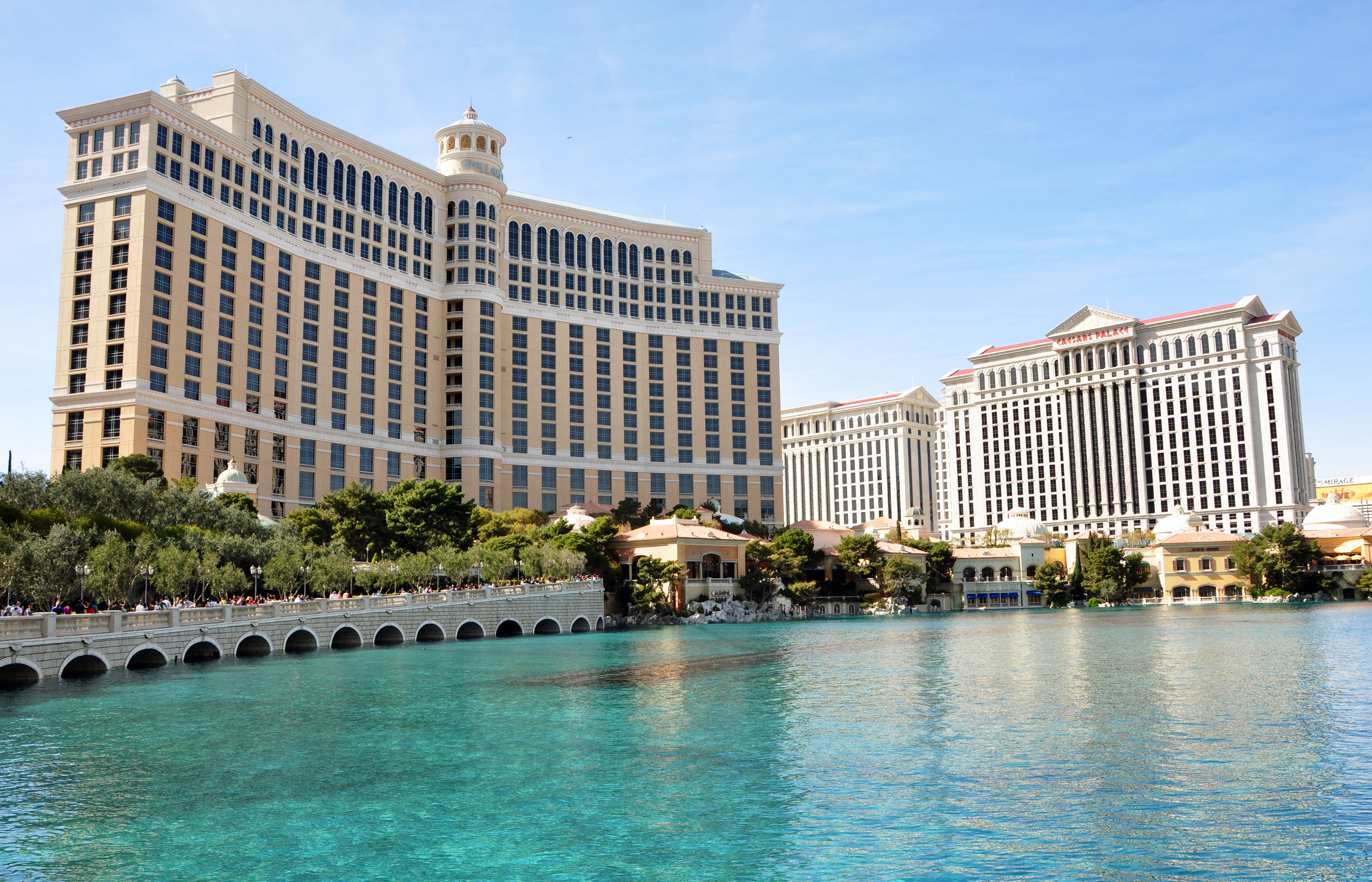
Bellagio and Caesars Palace

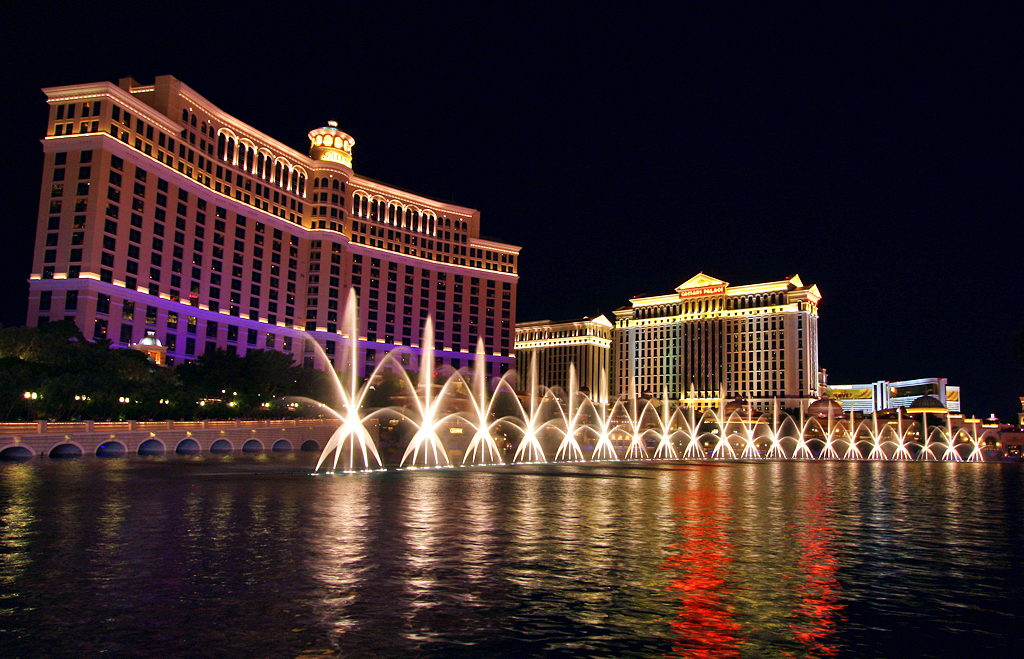
Bellagio fountains at night

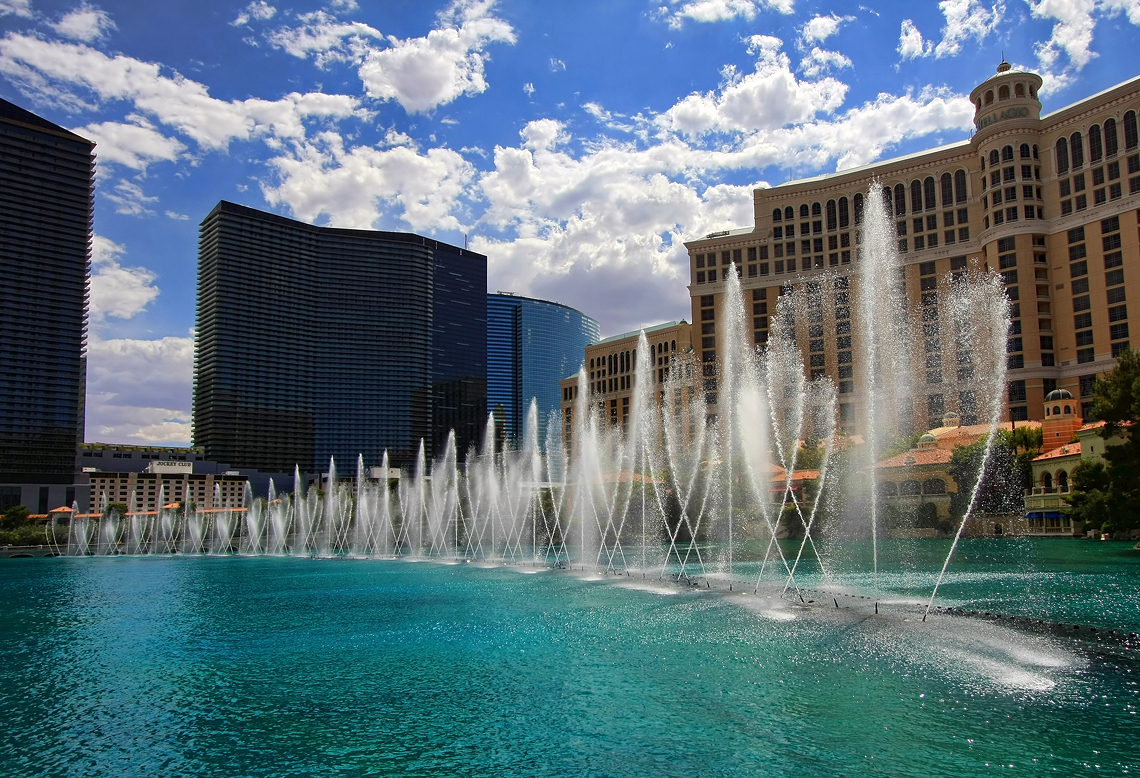
Fountains during the day

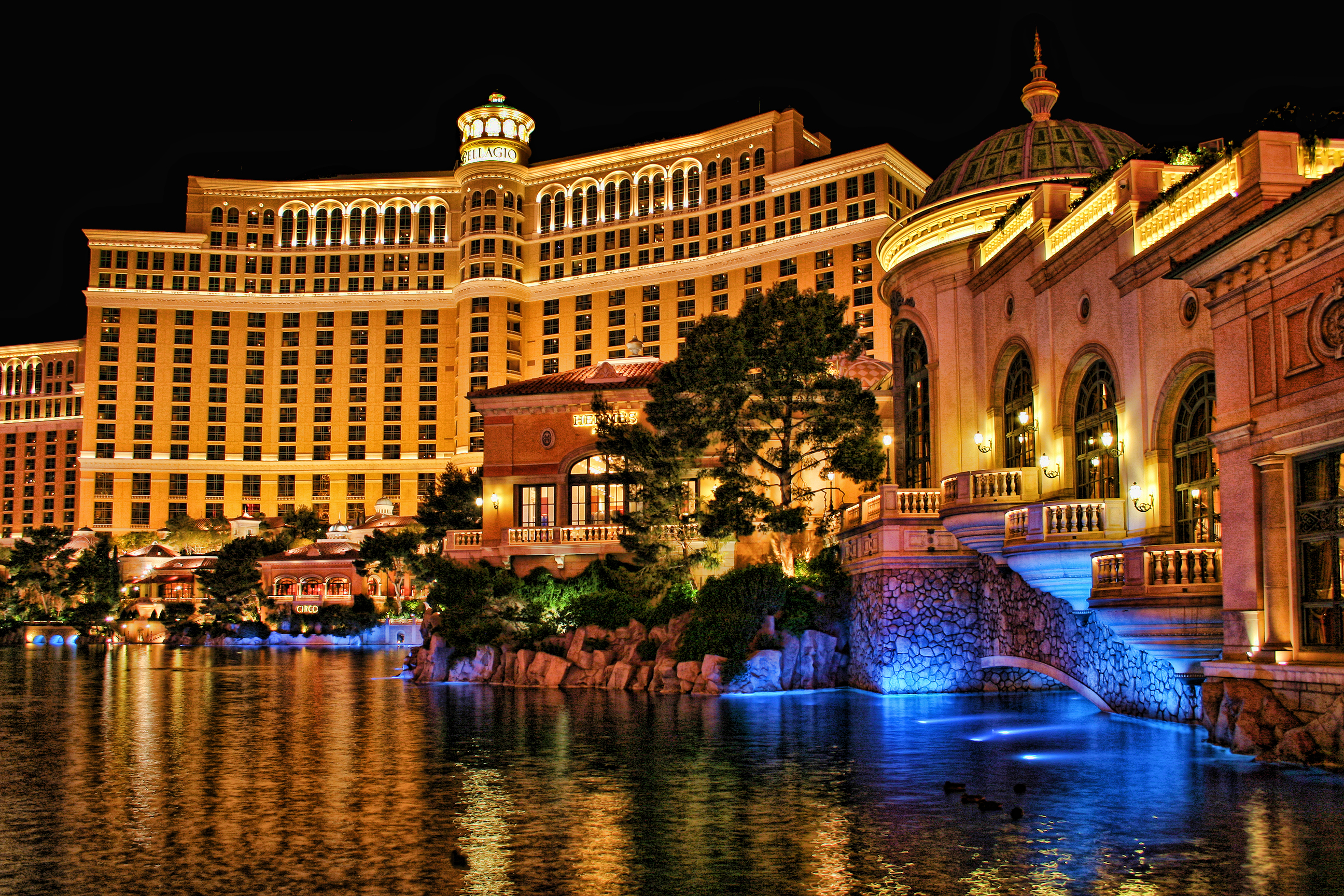
Main tower and retail area

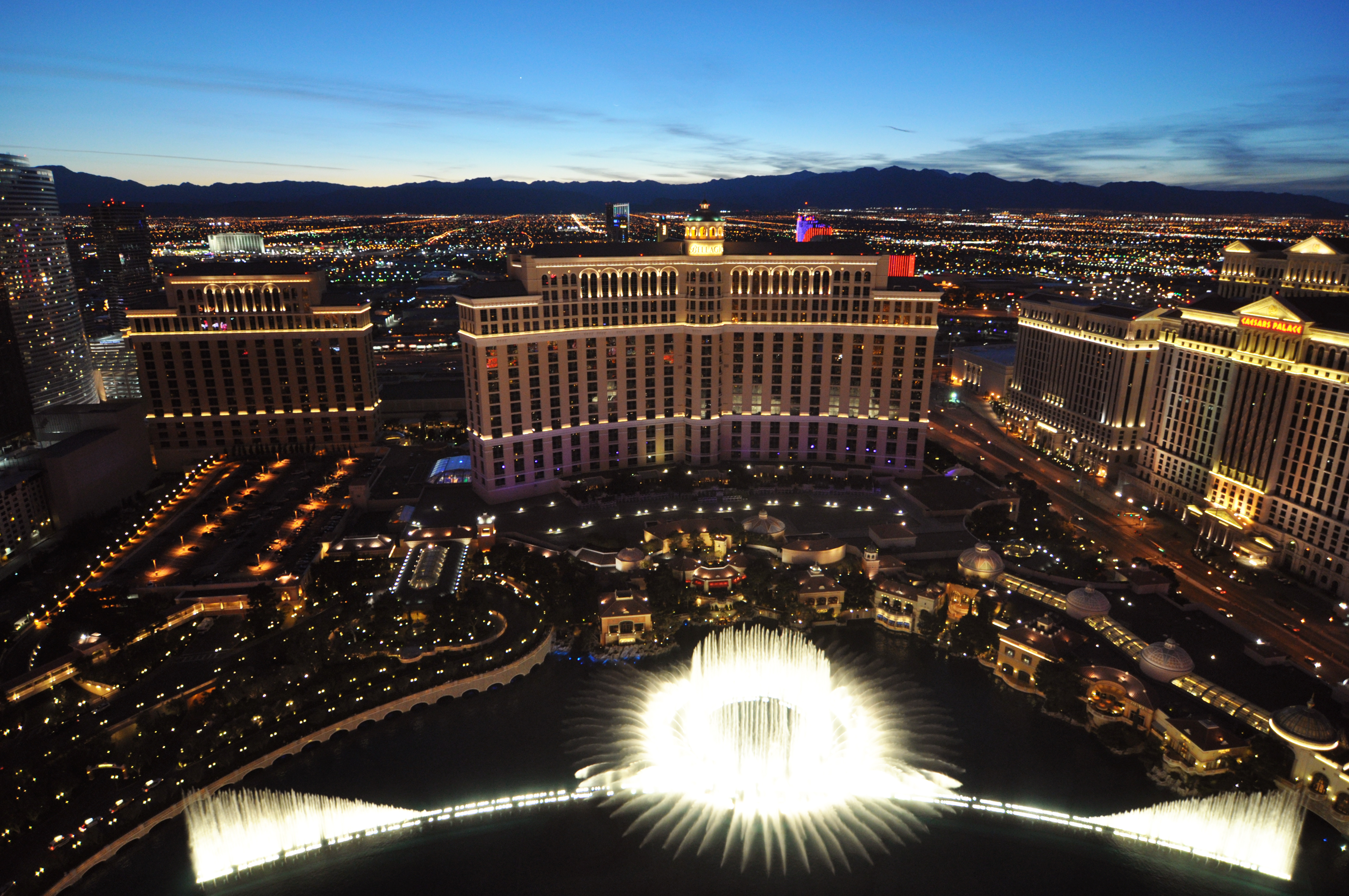
Fountains at night, seen from Paris Las Vegas

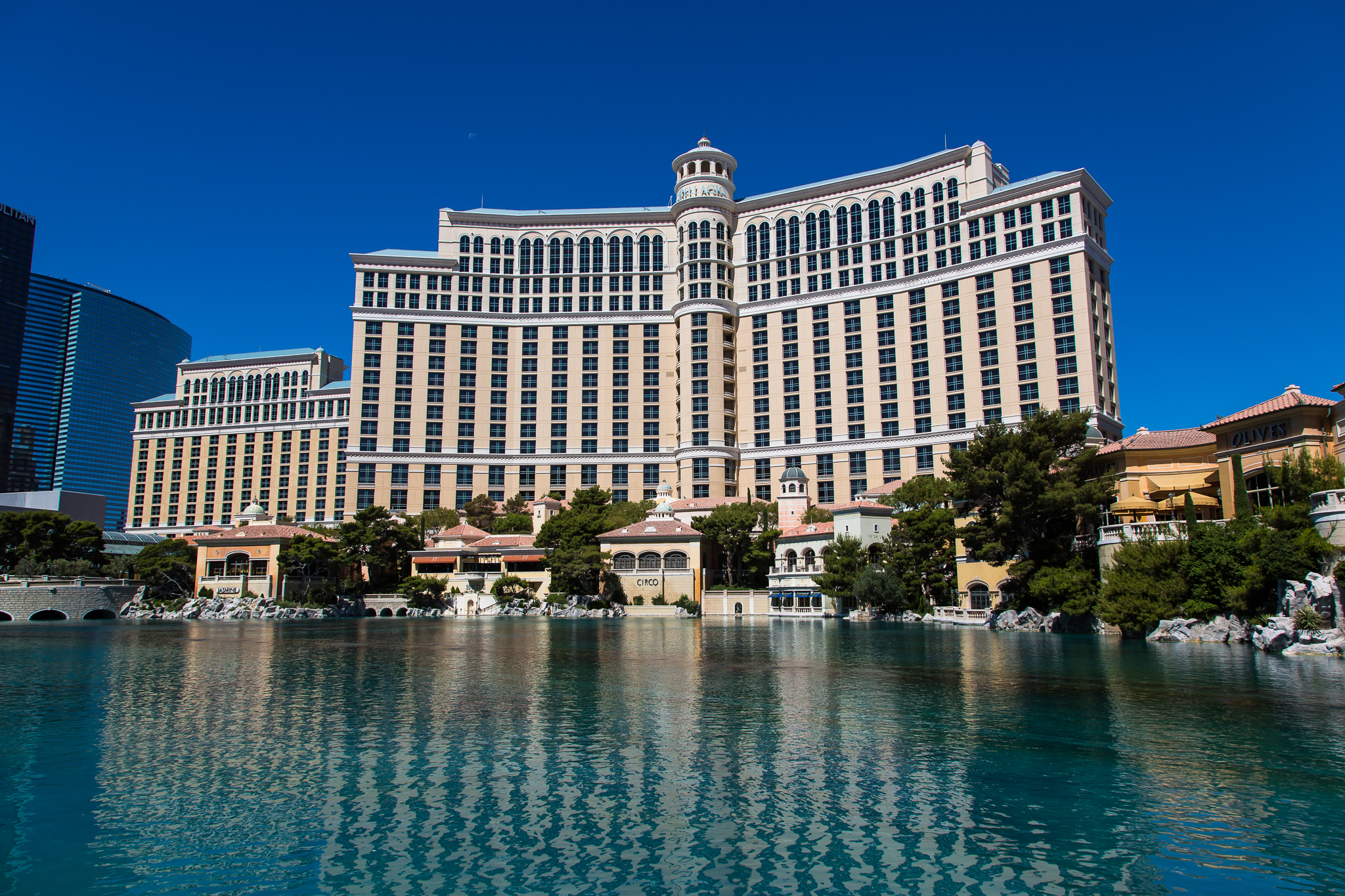
Bellagio hotel towers

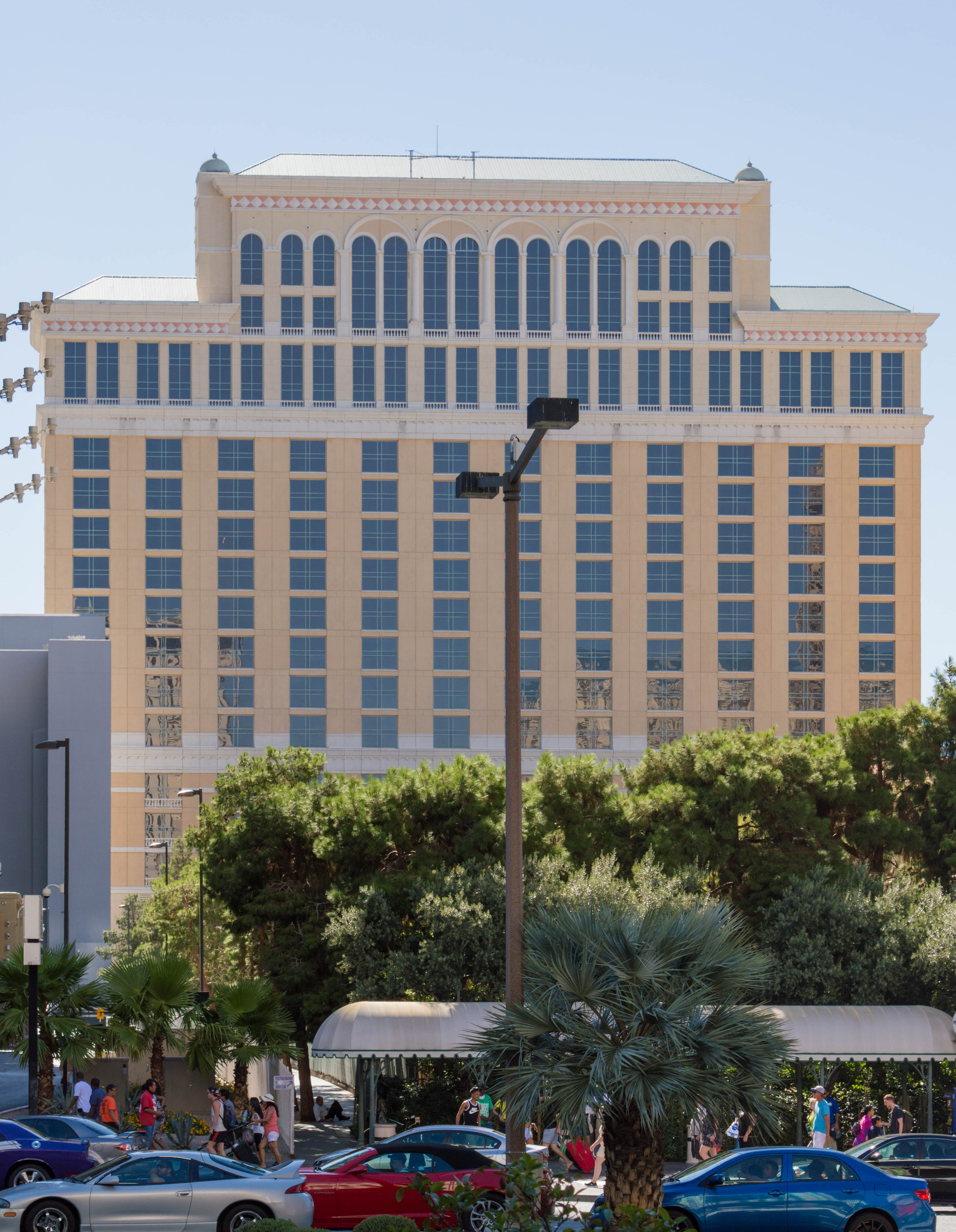
Spa Tower, seen from the Las Vegas Strip

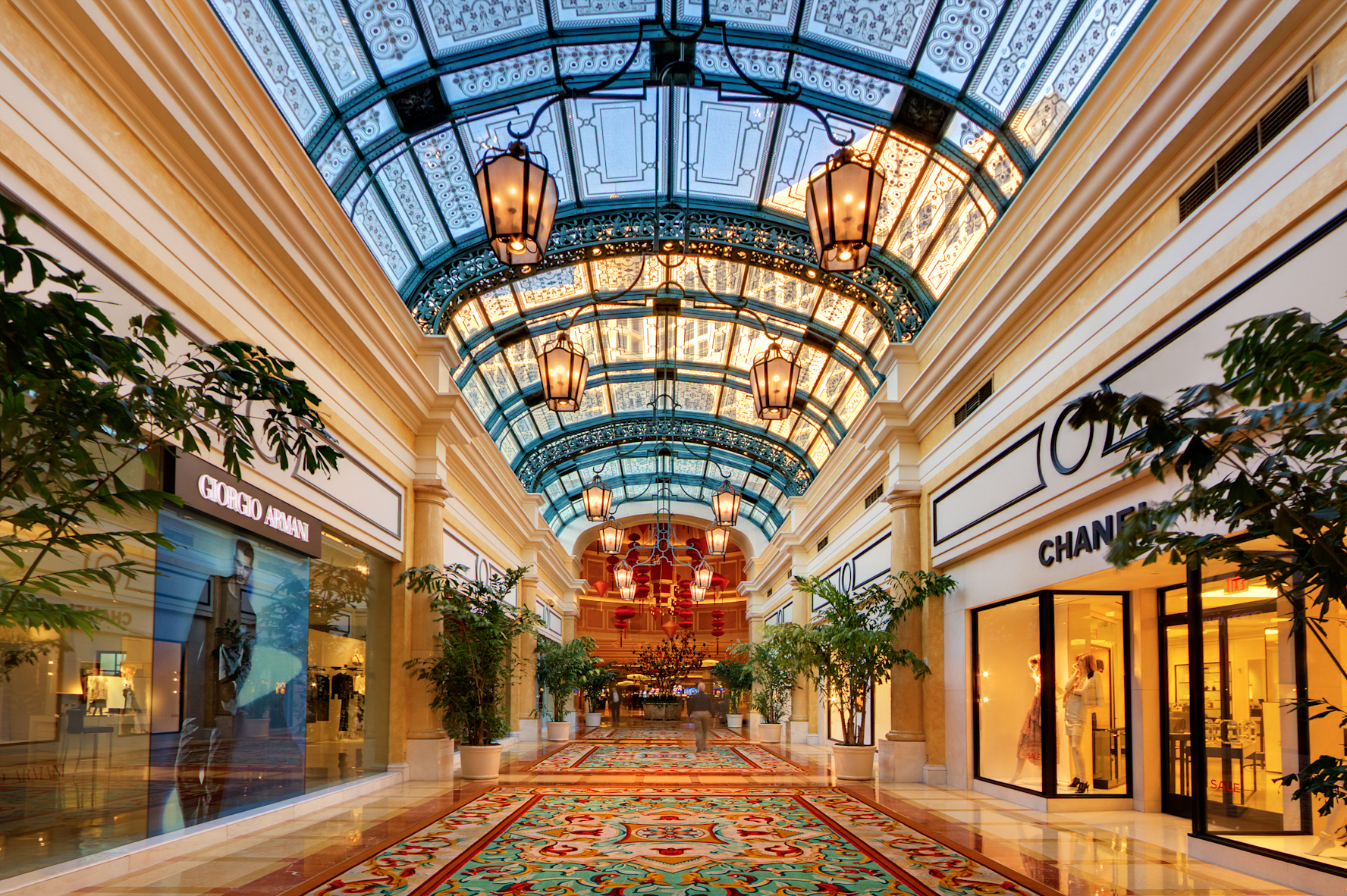
Via Bellagio shops

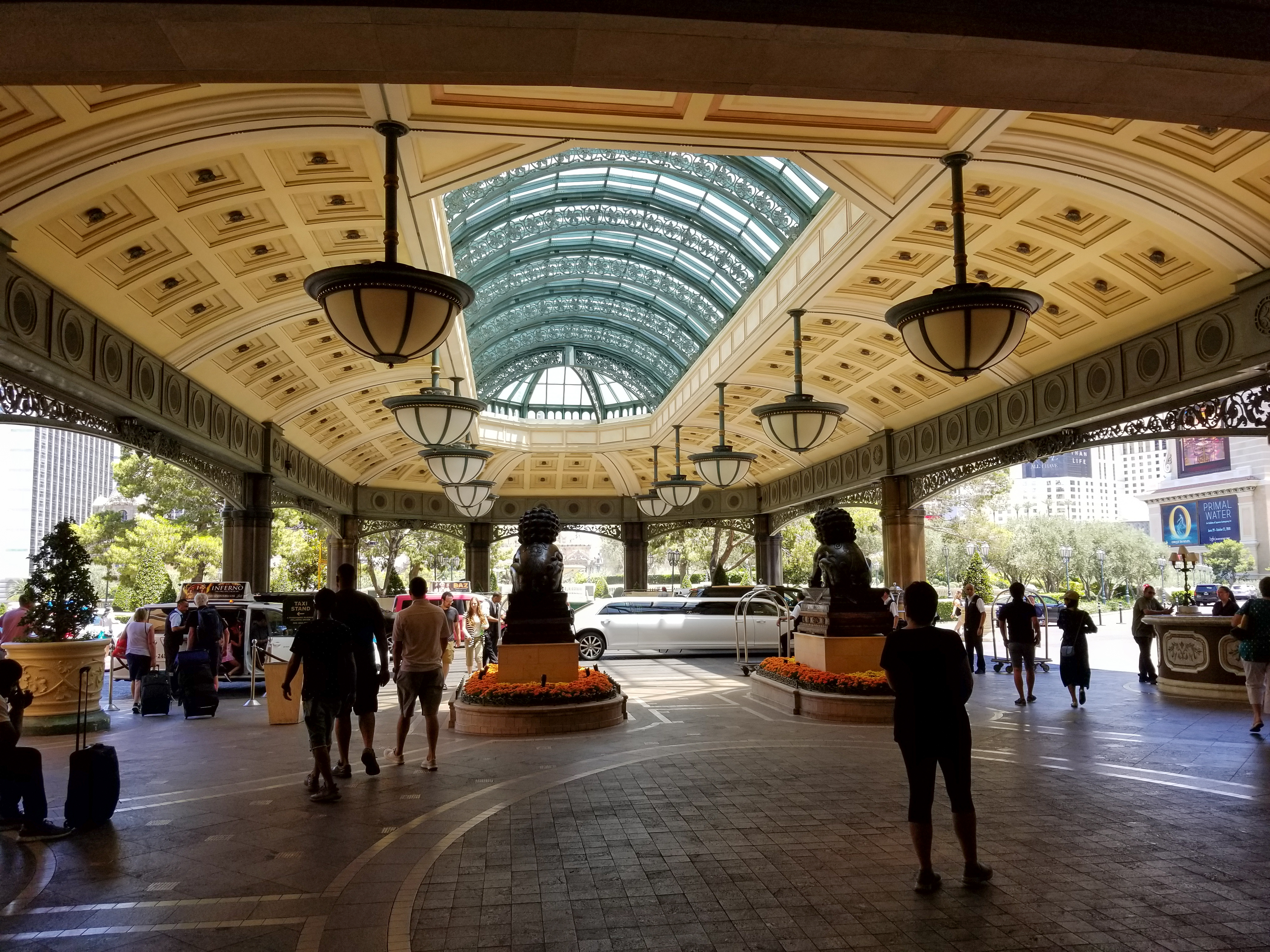
The porte-cochère

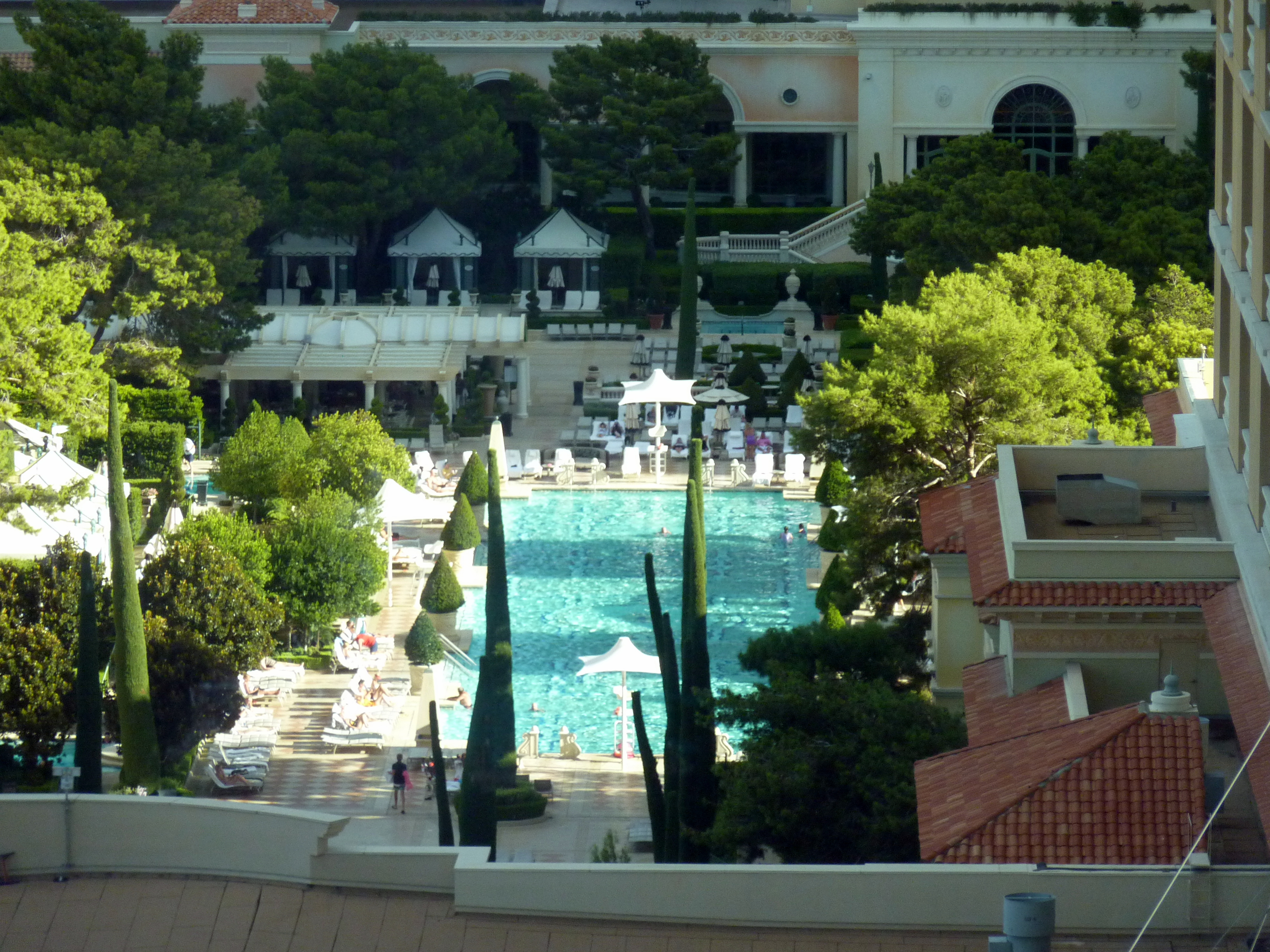
Pool area

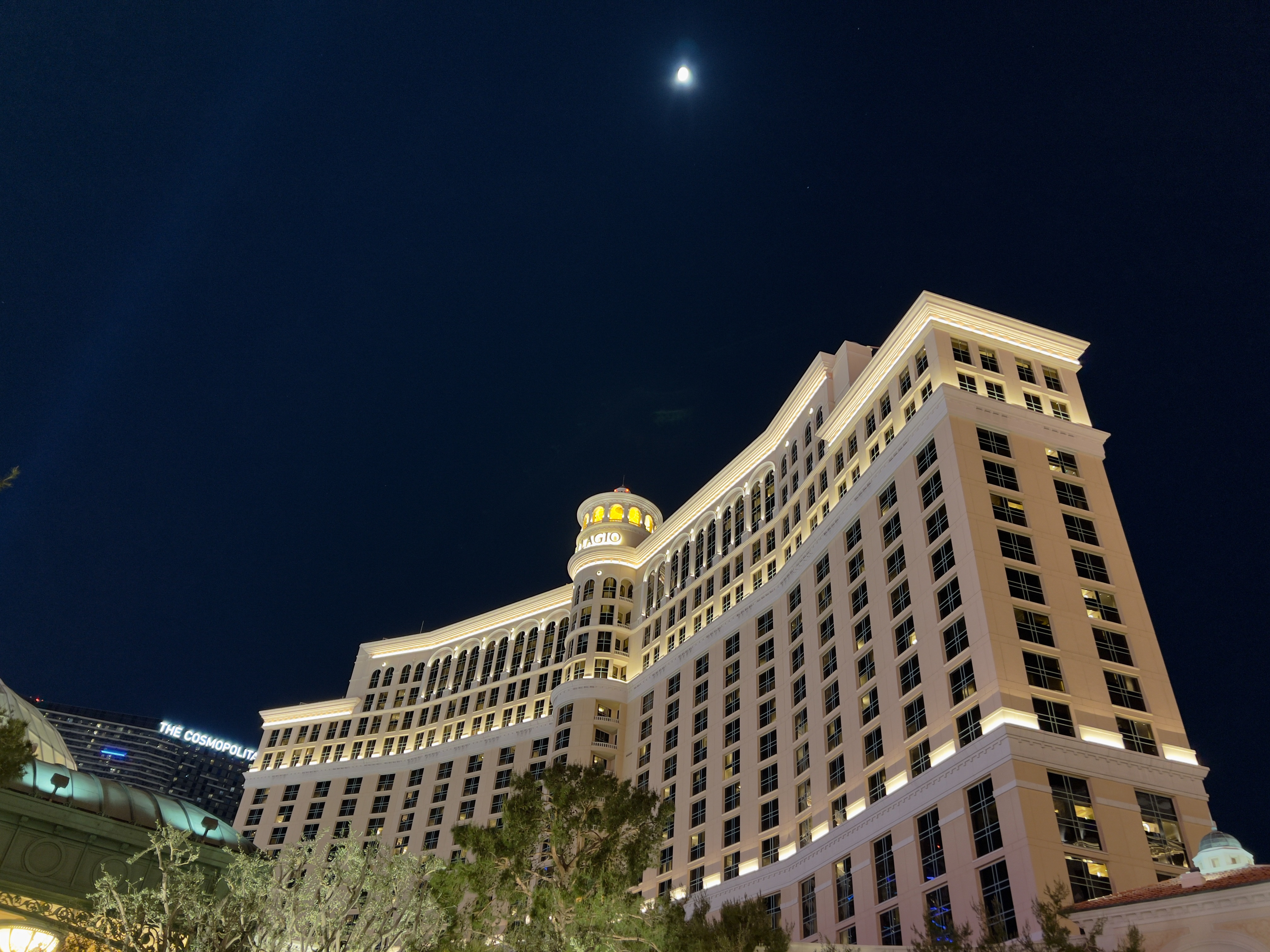
Moonlit evening

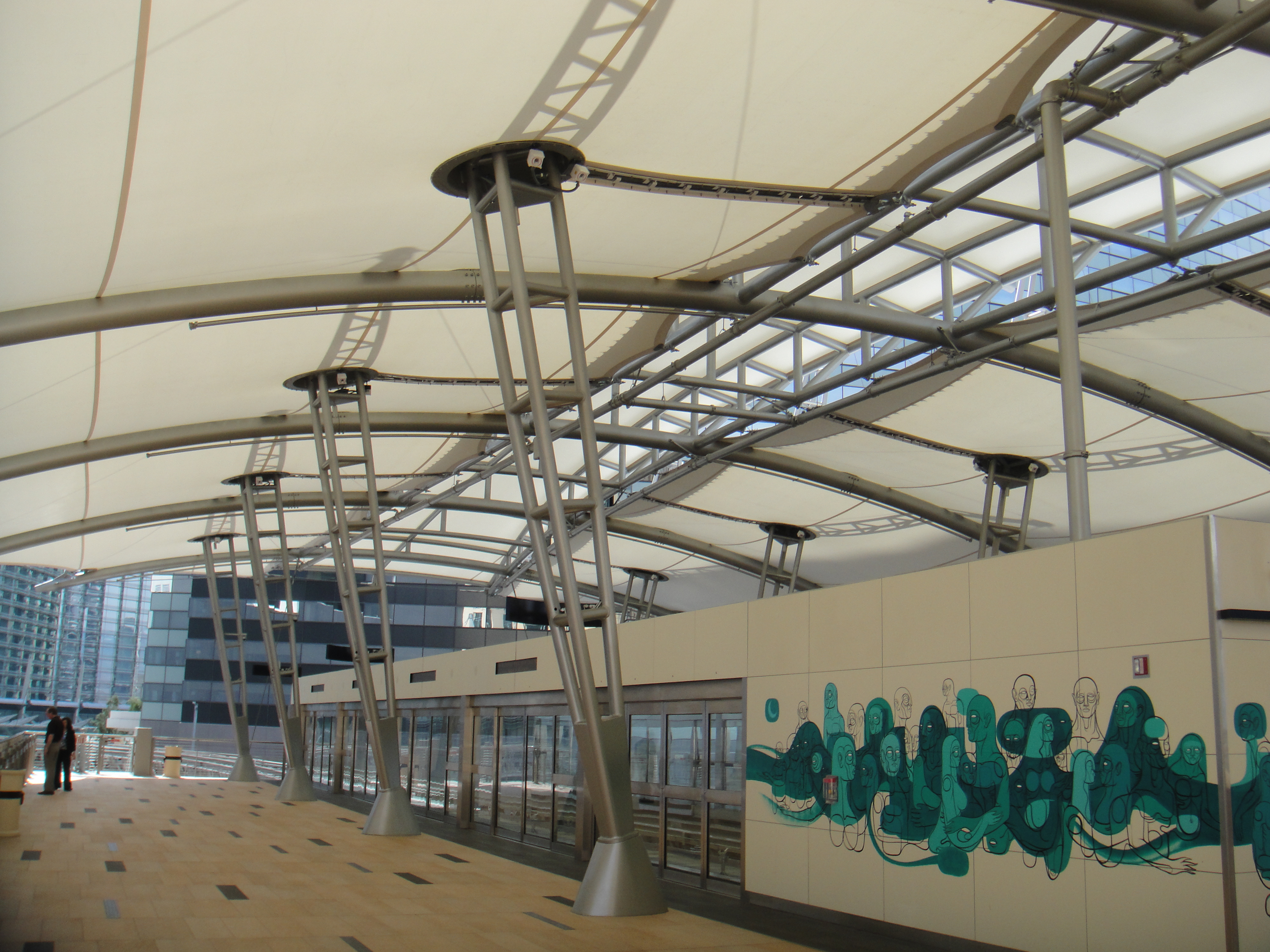
Bellagio station for Aria Express, which travels to nearby properties

== See also ==
- List of hotels in the United States
- List of largest hotels
- List of integrated resorts
