= Bellagio Gallery of Fine Art =

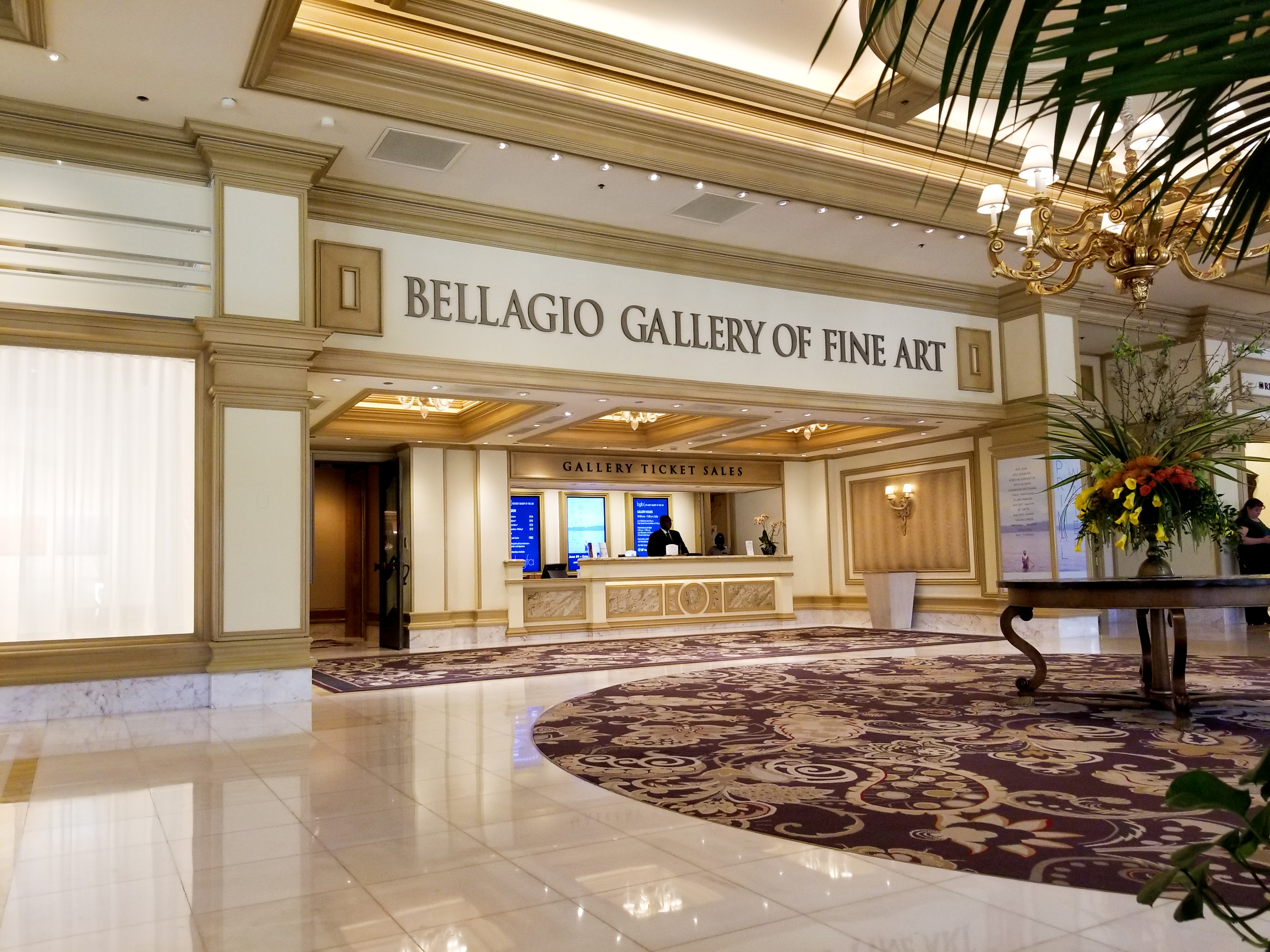
- Gallery entrance, 2018
- Established: October 15, 1998
- Location: Bellagio resort, Paradise, Nevada
- Coordinates: 36.112910°N 115.177579°W
- Type: Art gallery
- Founder: Steve Wynn
- Website: bellagio.mgmresorts.com/en/entertainment/gallery-of-fine-art.html

The Bellagio Gallery of Fine Art is an art gallery in the Bellagio resort, located on the Las Vegas Strip in Paradise, Nevada. It opened along with the rest of the property on October 15, 1998. Like the resort, the gallery was owned by Mirage Resorts, overseen by Steve Wynn. The gallery's collection initially consisted of artwork owned by the company, as well as personal art pieces leased from Wynn.

The gallery closed on May 28, 2000, as Mirage Resorts merged with MGM Grand Inc. to form MGM Mirage (now MGM Resorts International). Under the new ownership, the existing art collection was sold off and the gallery reopened on September 1, 2000, as a rotating exhibition space. The gallery has featured collections from partners such as the Museum of Fine Arts, Boston and Museum of Contemporary Art San Diego.

== History ==
=== Background and opening ===
In late 1996, Steve Wynn began purchasing artwork to display in his upcoming Bellagio resort on the Las Vegas Strip. In 1997, he successfully lobbied the state to enact a sales-tax break on art purchases of $25,000 or more. Wynn planned to charge a $10 admission fee for the Bellagio's art gallery, although the Nevada Tax Commission rejected his plan in August 1998, two months prior to the resort's opening. The commission ruled that, for educational purposes, any gallery taking advantage of the tax break must be free and widely accessible to the public, especially schoolchildren. Wynn had argued that an admission fee was necessary to cover the costs of displaying the art, including transportation, security, and insurance. He said that leftover revenue would be donated to local charities. The commission members reaffirmed their decision weeks before the opening, after Wynn had asked them to reconsider.

Forgoing the tax exemption, Wynn opened the resort and gallery on October 15, 1998, with the admission fee in place. Two months later, the Bellagio sued the commission, arguing that it went beyond the intent of the tax break law. The state modified the law in 1999, making Wynn eligible for a tax break while still being able to charge admission. In return, Wynn offered discounts to Nevada residents and free tours to schoolchildren. Nevada senator Joe Neal had been particularly opposed to Wynn's admission idea and the tax bill, making the issue a top priority in his unsuccessful campaign during the 1998 Nevada gubernatorial election.

The gallery originally featured artwork that was leased from Wynn's personal collection, as well as art purchased by owner Mirage Resorts. Bellagio advertised the gallery's artists as its headliners, unlike other resorts promoting traditional entertainers. Among the artists represented in the gallery were Paul Cézanne, Paul Gauguin, Henri Matisse, Claude Monet, Pablo Picasso, Pierre-Auguste Renoir, and Vincent van Gogh. All of the art was available for sale, and pieces were infrequently rotated out, for instance to take the place of sold artwork. The gallery offered an audio tour narrated by Wynn.

=== Changes ===
In 1999, the gallery was moved to a larger space in the resort, to accommodate long lines and a growing collection of artwork. The new space featured a larger retail store and black walls as opposed to the white coloring typically used in art galleries. New additions included paintings by Rembrandt and Georges Seurat.

Mirage Resorts closed the gallery on May 28, 2000, just before merging with MGM Grand Inc. to form MGM Mirage. Wynn departed the Bellagio following the merger. MGM announced plans to reopen the art gallery as a rotating exhibition space, hosting art pieces from major museums. The company stated that this would provide "a more varied and dynamic experience". Approximately 630,000 people had visited the gallery during its initial run, with an average of 1,800 visitors daily. Around 95 percent of the gallery's clientele were tourists. Wynn owned roughly half of the gallery's collection. The full collection was valued at $400 million. Shortly after the closure, MGM sold 11 company owned paintings, three of them to Wynn. The sale brought in $124 million, which would be used to reduce debt brought on by the company merger.

The gallery reopened as an exhibition space on September 1, 2000. PaperBall, a division of PaceWildenstein, took over operations of the 2,600 sq ft (240 m^{2}) facility in January 2002. Art from the exhibits was occasionally sold to interested parties, and an official art advisory division was established in 2005 to work with prospective buyers. The service was operated independently from the gallery. PaperBall turned operations over to MGM in January 2008, to focus on other ventures. The nearby Guggenheim Hermitage Museum closed later that year, leaving the Bellagio gallery as the only art facility on the Strip. The gallery added docent tours in 2010.

=== Exhibits ===
MGM's first exhibition came through a partnership with The Phillips Collection in Washington, D.C., which lent 26 pieces to the Bellagio for a six-month engagement, from 2000 to 2001. The Phillips received net profits earned through admission fees. A 2002 exhibit, Fabergé: Treasures From the Kremlin, featured a collection of works by Peter Carl Fabergé, including three Fabergé eggs. It was compiled from the collections of several lenders, and narrated by Fabergé expert Géza von Habsburg.

In 2004, the Museum of Fine Arts, Boston (MFA) provided a collection of Monet paintings to the Bellagio gallery for a 16-month exhibit. MFA was criticized for lending art to a for-profit facility and taking a percentage of the admission fee, going against standard museum practice. Critics argued that such partnerships favored large and wealthy museums over non-profits. MFA was also criticized for sending Monet paintings to be displayed in Las Vegas, which was considered inferior compared with the art culture in Boston. MFA defended its loan, calling the Bellagio exhibit educational since Las Vegas did not have any major art museums. According to surveys, approximately 30 percent of the Bellagio gallery's visitors had never been to an art gallery. The Monet exhibit was successful, attracting 450,000 visitors during its run. The two partnered again in 2005, with MFA lending a 34-piece collection of French art to the Bellagio. It included pieces from 19th century artists such as Théodore Rousseau and Van Goth.

The Museum of Contemporary Art San Diego (MCASD) lent 17 paintings to the gallery in 2009, including works by artists such as Ellsworth Kelly, Frank Stella, and Sol LeWitt. In 2010, MFA and MCASD both lent pieces to the gallery for Figuratively Speaking: A Survey of the Human Form. The exhibit featured works from the 19th century to the present, from artists such as Renoir, Picasso, Judith Shea, and Yoshitomo Nara. MFA and MCASD would again lend paintings to the gallery in 2011, for an exhibit of landscape art. A 2016 exhibit featured art by Monet, Van Gogh, Picasso, and Edgar Degas, again provided by MFA.

The gallery has hosted numerous Japanese artists and artwork. In 2018, Yayoi Kusama opened two art exhibits in separate rooms of the gallery.

In 2017, it featured an exhibit dedicated to boxer Muhammad Ali. It included family heirlooms and photos, as well as stories from his friends. In 2021, the gallery showcased an exhibit focused on the history of boxing in Las Vegas, made up of personal collections from people such as Dana White.

At the end of 2021, the gallery opened an immersive and interactive exhibit known as Ase: Afro Frequencies. It was inspired by the concept of aṣẹ and is dedicated to black culture. The exhibit was presented by Artechouse, collaborating with poet Ursula Rucker and Afro-Surrealist Vince Fraser.

Other artists represented in the rotating exhibits include Andy Warhol.

== Reception ==
When it opened, the gallery received praise from art experts, including Robert Rosenblum and Paul Schimmel. Art critic Michael Kimmelman, writing for The New York Times, praised the gallery for introducing fine art to Las Vegas. Jeffrey Vallance of Artforum praised the gallery and its location on the Las Vegas Strip.

The gallery won the "Best Art" category in the 2008 Readers' Choice Awards by Las Vegas Weekly. The publication called it "a grand example of how to offer the fine arts on the Strip". In 2022, Bethy Squires of Paste named it among the best museums in Las Vegas. She praised its exhibition of contemporary art, particularly from Asia.

== Artist Studio ==
The Artist Studio opened next to the gallery in 2018. It serves as a place for artists to work while the public observes. Spectators can also meet with them. The space has hosted numerous Japanese artists.
