= Jean-Philippe Maury =

French pastry chef

Jean-Philippe Maury is a French pastry chef, who currently owns iDessert in San Diego and oversees two pastry shops aboard a cruise ship.

== Biography ==
Maury was born and raised in Perpignan in the south of France. At the age of eight, he often helped his aunt while she was baking, which sparked his curiosity and inspiration for pastry. Maury has two Certificat d'Aptitude Professionelle (CAP) in hotel management and baking. At the age of 16, he began his training as a pastry chef, first training in pastry at L'École Hôtelière du Moulin à Vent and later undertaking master studies at La Chambre de Métiers in Perpignan, receiving his degree in 1991.

In 1997, Maury moved to New York City to work with chef François Payard. During the same year, he won the Meilleur Ouvrier de France (MOF) title for pastry. In 2002 and 2004, he received the title of World Champion in pastry, once as a participant in 2002, and once as coach in 2004, thus officially holding a double title. Maury's team was featured in a two-page feature story in Newsweek and an hour-long program on the Food Network.

Maury has appeared on TLC for the "Fabulous Cakes" show, and was a guest judge on season three of "The Next Iron Chef" on the Food Network.

== Pastry shops ==
In 1998, Maury was offered the position as executive pastry chef at the Bellagio in Las Vegas, and opening the Jean-Philippe Pâtisserie at the venue. His pâtisserie oversees the dessert production for 17 gourmet restaurants, room service, and all catering functions. As of April 2008, the pâtisserie holds the world's largest chocolate fountain.

In December 2009, Maury was appointed executive pastry chef in Aria Resort and Casino in Las Vegas, and opened a second Jean-Philippe Pâtisserie at the Aria. Maury collaborated on the design of the 6,000 sq ft (560 m^{2}) giving him a single location to produce all of his pastries. In 2011, Maury left his position at Aria to focus on other endeavors. In April 2018, his partnership ended with Bellagio and Aria Resort, and the two pâtisseries closed.

In 2015, Maury started opened iDessert in San Diego, California. Inspired by an idea for innovative desserts, customers create their own dessert, sundaes, and milkshakes with a wide variety of ingredients.
