= Largest creative work =

Largest or longest item in its field

The largest creative work is the largest or longest item in different fields of creative works. Some pieces were created with the specific intention of holding the record while others have been recognised for their size after completion.

== Literature ==
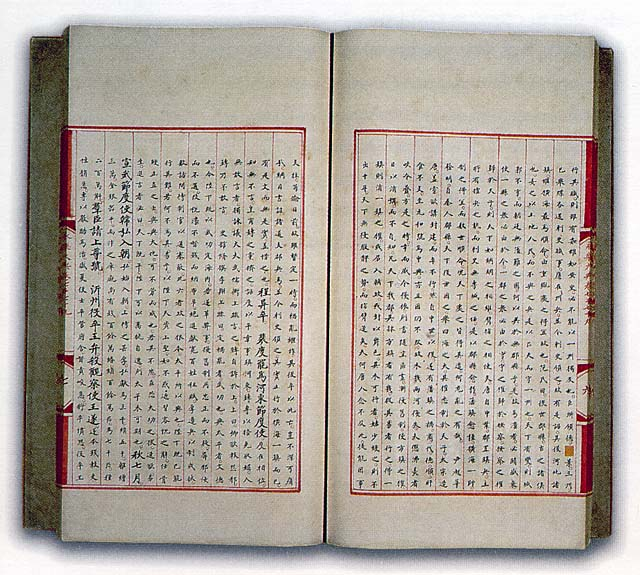
A page from the largest general encyclopedia, the Yongle Encyclopedia.

- The largest known general encyclopedia is the Yongle Encyclopedia commissioned by the Yongle Emperor of China's Ming dynasty in 1403. It comprised 22,937 manuscript scrolls in 11,095 volumes, occupying 40 cubic metres (1,400 cubic feet).
- The longest poem in any language is the Mahabharata, with more than 100,000 couplets.
- The longest epic cycle is the Tibetan Epic of King Gesar, which contains over 20 million words in more than one million verses.
- The longest love story and comedy may have been written by French novelist Honoré d’ Urfé (b. 1568). When it was first published, the story L’Astrée occupied 5,399 pages and published in 60 books.

== Performing arts ==
=== Film ===
- Logistics, directed by Erika Magnusson and Daniel Andersson, is officially the world's longest film. Running 51,420 minutes (857 hours) in length, the film follows the production cycle of a pedometer in reverse chronological order.

=== Music ===
- The longest musical performance began on 1 January 2000 and is set to last for 1000 years before repeating. Composed by Jem Finer, Longplayer is played in a 19th-century lighthouse near Canary Wharf, London, and other public listening posts.

=== Television ===
- The longest-running American television series is Meet the Press, a news program which started on 6 November 1947 and continues today.

=== Theatre ===
- The Mousetrap had been running continuously in London from 1952 to 16 March 2020, when it closed due to the COVID-19 pandemic. It has by far the longest initial run of any play in history, with more than 25,000 performances taking place, and the longest running show (of any type) of the modern era.

== Visual arts ==
=== Painting ===
- The largest painting according to the International Guinness Book of World Records in 2019 was "Century Buddha" completed by Hung Chi-Sung. It measured 12,086 m^{2} (130,090 sq ft) and was created in Hualien, Taiwan, between 2001 and 2018. Previous record holders included Ðuka Siroglavic's 10,800 m^{2} (116,000 sq ft) "Wave," (2007) David Aberg's 8,000 m^{2} (86,000 sq ft) "Mother Earth," (2006) and Eric Waugh's 3,850 m^{2} (41,400 sq ft), "Hero" (2002).
- The largest professional oil painting by a single artist according to the International Guinness Book of World Records in 2024 was measued 243 m^{2} (2,620 sq ft) completed by Gérard Di-Maccio from Di-Maccio Art Museum, The Forest of Taiyo, Japan.

=== Sculpture ===
- The largest contemporary artwork and largest land art sculpture is "City" by Michael Heizer, located at 38.034°, -115.443° in rural Lincoln County in the U.S. state of Nevada. City measures approximately 0.48 km (0.3 mi) wide and 2.01 km (1.25 mi) long.

=== Textiles ===
- The world's largest hand woven carpet is a Persian carpet made in Iran and completed in 2007. It has 2.2 billion knots, measuring 5,625 m^{2} (60,550 sq ft).

=== Ceramics, single fired object ===
This category is reserved for a single object fired within a kiln:

- Artist Frans Widerberg unveiled a 5.14 meter (16.8 ft) tall jar in 2001. His creation required 10 tons (22,000 lbs) of clay. The jar is housed in Møllebyen (the Mill Town) the former city center of Moss, Norway.
- Ceramist Kim Se-yong claims to have produced the world's largest celadon vase. It is 107 cm (42 inch) tall and weighs 157 kg (350 lbs). It reportedly took many attempts over a period of a decade to successfully fire the richly detailed Shipjangsaeng (十長生) (10 symbols of longevity) vase. It was created using traditional methods including hand/foot kneaded clay, foot driven potter's wheel and wood fired kiln.
- Artist Mmala Oefile unveiled The Big Pot Africa in Molepolole, Gaborone, Botswana, on 12 December 2020. The 7.5 m (24.6 ft) tall ceramic piece was fired using cow-dung. The object appears to have been fired in place where it was formed rather than being moved into a kiln.
- Ceramist Nguyen Hung and Huong Viet Ceramic Company unveiled the world's largest carved ceramic plate in 2018. The plate 137 cm (54 inch) diameter plate weighs 400 kg (881 lbs) and required 2,500 man-hours. The plate features a complex design of cedar trees, a pair of peacocks and Feng Shui elements.

== Game ==
- Taikyoku shogi, chess variant

== See also ==
- Louvre – the world's largest art gallery
- List of largest buildings
- Unfinished creative work
