= World Poker Tour Champions Club =

Poker tournament winners

WPT Champions Club
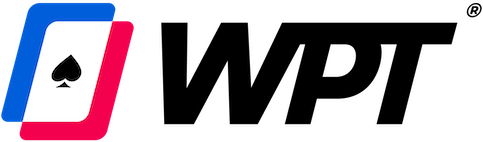
- CHAMPIONS CLUB
- Sport: Poker
- Competition: World Poker Tour
- Awarded for: Main Tour champion of the World Poker Tour

History
- First award: Season 1 - 2002
- First winner: (Denmark) Gus Hansen
- Most wins: (United States) Darren Elias (4)
- Most recent: (United States) Ian Cohen (WPT Seminole Hard Rock Poker Showdown Championship - April 2025)
- Next ceremony: WPT Cyprus Championship
- Website: worldpokertour.com

The World Poker Tour (WPT) has operated a series of international poker tournaments since 2002 with winners of WPT Main Tour stops awarded a membership to the WPT Champions Club. The WPT Champions Cup is the trophy awarded to all winners of WPT Main Tour stops, and champions have their names engraved on the WPT Champions Cup.

On July 21, 2020, the WPT Champions Cup was renamed to the Mike Sexton WPT Champions Cup in honor of WPT commentator and WPT Champions Club member Mike Sexton. Sexton died on September 6, 2020, after battling prostate cancer.

== World Poker Tour champions ==
Winner of poker's Triple Crown.

=== Season 1 (I) ===
The inaugural season of the WPT featured 13 events running from May 2002 to April 2003.

WPT Season 1(I) Results
Date	Event	Location	Winner	Prize	Runner-up	Entrants	Buy-in	Prizepool
May 27-June 1	Five Diamond World Poker Classic	Bellagio Resort & Casino	Gus Hansen	$556,460	John Juanda	146	$10,000	$1,416,200
August 30–31	Legends of Poker	Bicycle Casino	Chris Karagulleyan	$258,000	Hon Le	134	$5,000	$670,000
October 9–11	Aruba Poker Classic	The Radisson Aruba Resort & Casino	Juha Helppi	$50,000	Anssi Tuulivirda	100	$300	$350,000
October 19	Costa Rica Classic	Casinos Europa	Jose Rosenkrantz	$108,730	Jamie Ligator	134	$500	$234,858
November 10–11	Gold Rush	Lucky Chances Casino	Paul Darden	$146,000	Chris Bigler	152	$3,000	$456,000
November 14–17	World Poker Finals	Foxwoods Resort Casino	Howard Lederer	$320,400	Layne Flack	89	$10,000	$915,000
January 28–31	World Poker Open	Binion's Horseshoe Tunica	Dave Ulliott	$589,175	Phil Ivey	160	$10,000	$1,600,000
February 12–15	Euro Finals of Poker	Aviation Club de France	Christer Johansson	€500,000	Claude Cohen	86	€10,000	€831,000
February 21–24	L.A. Poker Classic	Commerce Casino	Gus Hansen	$532,490	Daniel Rentzer	136	$10,000	$1,360,000
February 25–26	Celebrity Invitational	Commerce Casino	Layne Flack	$125,300	Jerry Buss	104	$0	$208,300
March 6	Party Poker Million II	Holland America Cruise	Howard Lederer	$289,150	Chip Jett	177	$5,300	$1,013,800
March 31-April 2	World Poker Challenge	Reno Hilton	Ron Rose	$168,298	Cal Dykes	87	$5,000	$421,746
April 14–18	WPT World Championship	Bellagio Resort & Casino	Alan Goehring	$1,011,886	Kirill Gerasimov	111	$25,000	$2,691,750

- Costa Rica Classic was a $500 buy-in with $500 rebuys.
- Party Poker Million II was held a Limit Hold'em tournament.
- Party Poker Million II was held on Holland America's MS Zaandam cruise ship sailing from Port Canaveral, Florida, to the Virgin Islands.
- Gus Hansen became the first player to win two WPT titles.
- Howard Lederer won WPT Player of the Year for Season 1 (I).

=== Season 2 (II) ===
The second season of the WPT featured 14 events running from July 2003 to April 2004.

WPT Season 2 (II) Results
Date	Event	Location	Winner	Prize	Runner-up	Entrants	Buy-in	Prizepool
July 10–13	Grand Prix de Paris	Aviation Club de France	David Benyamine	€357,000	Jan Boubli	96	€10,000	€894,400
September 1–3	Legends of Poker	Bicycle Casino	Mel Judah	$579,375	Paul Phillips	309	$5,000	$1,545,000
September 20–22	Borgata Poker Open	Borgata Hotel & Casino	Noli Francisco	$470,000	Charlie Shoten	235	$5,000	$1,175,000
October 18	Ultimate Poker Classic	Radisson Aruba Resort & Casino	Erick Lindgren	$500,000	Daniel Larsson	436	$4,000	$1,697,460
November 14–17	World Poker Finals	Foxwoods Resort Casino	Hoyt Corkins	$1,089,200	Mohamed Ibrahim	313	$10,000	$3,155,000
December 15–18	Five Diamond World Poker Classic	Bellagio Resort & Casino	Paul Phillips	$1,101,908	Dewey Tomko	314	$10,000	$3,044,750
January 25	PokerStars Caribbean Poker Adventure	Royal Caribbean	Gus Hansen	$455,780	Hoyt Corkins	221	$7,500	$1,657,501
January 26–29	World Poker Open	Horseshoe Casino & Hotel	Barry Greenstein	$1,278,370	Randy Jensen	367	$10,000	$3,455,050
February 21–24	L.A. Poker Classic	Commerce Casino	Antonio Esfandiari	$1,399,135	Vinnie Vinh	382	$10,000	$3,781,500
February 24	Celebrity Invitational	Commerce Casino	Phil Laak	$100,000	Humberto Brenes	196	$0	$200,000
March 3–5	Bay 101 Shooting Star	Bay 101	Phil Gordon	$360,000	Chris Moneymaker	243	$5,000	$1,125,000
March 18	PartyPoker Million III	Card Player Cruise	Erick Lindgren	$1,000,000	Daniel Negreanu	546	$7,500	$3,682,337
March 30-April 1	World Poker Challenge	Reno Hilton	Mike Kinney	$629,469	Paul Clark	342	$5,000	$1,658,700
April 19–23	WPT World Championship	Bellagio Resort & Casino	Martin de Knijff	$2,728,356	Hasan Habib	343	$25,000	$8,342,000

- PokerStars Caribbean Poker Adventure was held on Royal Caribbean Voyager of the Seas cruise ship.
- PartyPoker Million III was held as a Limit Hold'em tournament.
- PartyPoker Million III was held on a Card Player Cruise on the Sea of Cortez.
- Gus Hansen became the first player to win three WPT titles.
- Erick Lindgren won WPT Player of the Year for Season 2 (II).

=== Season 3 (III) ===
The third season of the WPT featured 16 events running from July 2004 to April 2005.

WPT Season 3 (III) Results
Date	Event	Location	Winner	Prize	Runner-up	Entrants	Buy-in	Prizepool
July 17–21	Grand Prix de Paris	Aviation Club de France	Surinder Sunar	€679,860	Tony G	205	€10,000	€1,957,750
July 29-August 1	Mirage Poker Showdown	The Mirage	Eli Elezra	$1,024,574	Lee Watkinson	281	$10,000	$2,725,200
August 28–31	Legends of Poker	Bicycle Casino	Doyle Brunson	$1,198,260	Lee Watkinson	667	$5,000	$3,335,000
September 19–22	Borgata Poker Open	Borgata Hotel & Casino	Daniel Negreanu	$1,117,400	David Williams	302	$10,000	$3,020,000
September 26-October 1	Aruba Poker Classic	Radisson Aruba Resort & Casino	Eric Brenes	$1,000,000	Layne Flack	647	$6,000	$3,879,000
October 19–22	Festa al Lago	Bellagio Resort & Casino	Carlos Mortensen	$1,000,000	Kido Pham	312	$10,000	$3,026,400
November 13–17	World Poker Finals	Foxwoods Resort Casino	Tuan Le	$1,549,588	Temperance Hutter	674	$10,000	$6,765,000
December 14–18	Five Diamond World Poker Classic	Bellagio Resort & Casino	Daniel Negreanu	$1,770,218	Humberto Brenes	376	$15,000	$5,470,800
January 8–11	PokerStars Caribbean Poker Adventure	Atlantis Paradise Island	John Gale	$890,600	Alex Balandin	461	$8,000	$3,487,200
January 24–27	World Poker Open	Gold Strike Resort and Casino	Johnny Stolzmann	$1,491,444	Chau Giang	512	$10,000	$3,832,773
February 18–22	L.A. Poker Classic	Commerce Casino	Michael Mizrachi	$1,859,909	Haralabos Voulgaris	538	$10,000	$5,166,414
February 23–24	Celebrity Invitational	Commerce Casino	Alex Brenes	$125,500	Johan Storakers	233	$0	$225,500
March 7–11	Bay 101 Shooting Star	Bay 101	Danny Nguyen	$1,025,000	Jay Martens	438	$10,000	$4,070,000
March 19–25	PartyPoker Million IV	Holland America Cruise	Michael Gracz	$1,500,000	David Minto	735	$10,000	$7,430,000
March 29-April 1	World Poker Challenge	Reno Hilton	Arnold Spee	$633,880	Blair Rodman	345	$5,000	$1,725,350
April 18–24	WPT World Championship	Bellagio Resort & Casino	Tuan Le	$2,856,150	Paul Maxfield	453	$25,000	$10,961,000

- PartyPoker Million IV was held as a Limit Hold'em tournament.
- PartyPoker Million IV was held on Holland America's MS Oosterdam cruise ship on the Sea of Cortez.
- Daniel Negreanu and Tuan Le became the third and fourth players respectively to win two WPT titles in the same season after Gus Hansen and Howard Lederer each won two in Season 1 (I).
- Doyle Brunson became the first player to win both the WSOP Main Event and a WPT title.
- Daniel Negreanu won WPT Player of the Year for Season 3 (III).

=== Season 4 (IV) ===
The fourth season of the WPT featured 16 events running from May 2005 to April 2006.

WPT Season 4 (IV) Results
Date	Event	Location	Winner	Prize	Runner-up	Entrants	Buy-in	Prizepool
May 23–26	Mirage Poker Showdown	The Mirage	Gavin Smith	$1,153,778	Ted Forrest	317	$10,000	$3,074,900
July 25–29	Grand Prix de Paris	Aviation Club de France	Roland de Wolfe	€479,680	Juha Helppi	160	€10,000	€1,520,000
August 27–31	Legends of Poker	Bicycle Casino	Alex Kahaner	$1,150,900	Kenna James	839	$5,000	$4,195,000
September 19–22	Borgata Poker Open	Borgata Hotel & Casino	Al Ardebili	$1,498,650	Ricardo Festejo	515	$10,000	$4,995,500
September 26-October 1	Aruba Poker Classic	Radisson Aruba Resort & Casino	Freddy Deeb	$1,000,000	Josh Schlein	647	$5,000	$3,235,000
October 18–21	Festa al Lago	Bellagio Resort & Casino	Minh Ly	$1,060,050	Dan Harrington	420	$10,000	$4,074,000
November 13–18	World Poker Finals	Foxwoods Resort Casino	Nick Schulman	$2,167,500	Anthony Licastro	783	$10,000	$7,855,000
December 12–16	Five Diamond World Poker Classic	Bellagio Resort & Casino	Rehne Pedersen	$2,078,185	Patrik Antonius	555	$15,000	$8,075,250
January 5–10	PokerStars Caribbean Poker Adventure	Atlantis Paradise Island	Steve Paul-Ambrose	$1,388,600	Brook Lyter	724	$7,800	$5,647,200
January 19–23	World Poker Open	Gold Strike Resort and Casino	Scotty Nguyen	$969,421	Michael Mizrachi	327	$10,000	$3,171,900
January 29-February 1	Borgata Winter Poker Open	Borgata Hotel & Casino	Michael Mizrachi	$1,173,373	John D'Agostino	381	$10,000	$3,695,700
February 16–21	L.A. Poker Classic	Commerce Casino	Alan Goehring	$2,391,550	Daniel Quach	692	$10,000	$6,643,200
February 22–23	Invitational	Commerce Casino	Barry Greenstein	$100,000	Blair Rodman	315	$0	$200,000
February 27-March 3	Bay 101 Shooting Star	Bay 101	Nam Le	$1,198,300	Ravi Udayakumar	518	$10,000	$4,702,800
March 27–30	World Poker Challenge	Reno Hilton	Mike Simon	$1,052,890	Jason Stern	592	$5,000	$2,845,700
April 6–9	Foxwoods Poker Classic	Foxwoods Resort Casino	Victor Ramdin	$1,331,889	Alex Jacob	431	$10,000	$4,175,200
April 18–24	WPT World Championship	Bellagio Resort & Casino	Joe Bartholdi	$3,760,165	Davidson Matthew	605	$25,000	$14,671,250

- Gavin Smith won WPT Player of the Year for Season 4 (IV).

=== Season 5 (V) ===
The fifth season of the WPT featured 18 events running from May 2006 to April 2007.

WPT Season 5 (V) Results
Date	Event	Location	Winner	Prize	Runner-up	Entrants	Buy-in	Prizepool
May 14–17	Mirage Poker Showdown	The Mirage	Stanley Weiss	$1,320,255	Harry Demetriou	384	$10,000	$3,724,800
June 4–8	Mandalay Bay Poker Championship	Mandalay Bay	Joe Tehan	$1,033,440	Burt Boutin	349	$10,000	$1,033,440
June 12–16	Grand Prix de Paris	Aviation Club de France	Christian Grundtvig	€712,500	Jani Sointula	232	€10,000	€2,320,000
August 26–30	Legends of Poker	Bicycle Casino	Joe Pelton	$1,602,670	Frankie O'Dell	466	$10,000	$4,520,200
September 15–19	Borgata Poker Open	Borgata Hotel & Casino	Mark Newhouse	$1,519,020	Chris McCormack	540	$10,000	$5,238,000
October 16–20	Festa al Lago	Bellagio Resort & Casino	Andreas Walnum	$1,090,025	Steve Wong	433	$10,000	$4,200,100
October 22–24	Canadian Open Championship	Fallsview Casino Resort	Scott Clements	C$250,027	Anthony O'Hagan	298	C$2,500	C$720,533
October 25–29	North American Poker Championship	Fallsview Casino Resort	Soren Turkewitsch	C$1,380,378	Jason Sagle	497	C$10,000	C$4,829,332
November 12–16	World Poker Finals	Foxwoods Resort Casino	Nenad Medic	$1,717,194	EG Harvin	609	$10,000	$5,749,481
December 14–19	Five Diamond World Poker Classic	Bellagio Resort & Casino	Joe Hachem	$2,207,575	Jim Hanna	583	$15,000	$8,482,650
January 5–10	PokerStars Caribbean Adventure	Atlantis Paradise Island	Ryan Daut	$1,535,255	Isaac Haxton	937	$7,800	$7,063,842
January 21–25	World Poker Open	Gold Strike Resort and Casino	Bryan Sumner	$913,986	Daniel Negreanu	294	$10,000	$2,812,000
January 26–30	Borgata Winter Poker Open	Borgata Hotel & Casino	John Hennigan	$1,606,223	Chuck Kelley	571	$10,000	$5,529,000
February 24-March 1	L.A. Poker Classic	Commerce Casino	Eric Hershler	$2,429,970	J.C. Tran	791	$10,000	$7,593,600
March 3–5	Celebrity Invitational	Commerce Casino	Adam Weinraub	$125,000	John Cernuto	420	$0	$200,000
March 12–16	Bay 101 Shooting Star	Bay 101	Ted Forrest	$1,100,000	J.J. Liu	450	$10,000	$4,490,000
March 25–28	World Poker Challenge	Reno Hilton	J.C. Tran	$683,473	J.C. Alvarado	475	$5,000	$2,278,250
March 30-April 4	Foxwoods Poker Classic	Foxwoods Resort Casino	Raj Patel	$1,298,405	Paul Matteo	415	$10,000	$3,898,635
April 21–27	WPT World Championship	Bellagio Resort & Casino	Carlos Mortensen	$3,970,415	Kirk Morrison	639	$25,000	$15,495,750

- J.C. Tran won WPT Player of the Year for Season 5 (V).

=== Season 6 (VI) ===
The sixth season of the WPT featured 19 events running from April 2007 to April 2008.

WPT Season 6 (VI) Results
Date	Event	Location	Winner	Prize	Runner-up	Entrants	Buy-in	Prizepool
May 19–23	Mirage Poker Showdown	The Mirage	Jonathan Little	$1,091,295	Cory Carroll	309	$10,000	$2,907,381
May 29-June 2	Mandalay Bay Poker Championship	Mandalay Bay	Shawn Buchanan	$768,775	Jared Hamby	228	$10,000	$2,211,600
July 10–15	Bellagio Cup III	Bellagio Resort & Casino	Kevin Saul	$1,342,320	Mike Matusow	535	$10,000	$5,189,500
August 25–30	Legends of Poker	Bicycle Casino	Dan Harrington	$1,599,865	David Pham	485	$10,000	$4,607,500
September 6–9	Gulf Coast Poker Championship	Beau Rivage	Bill Edler	$747,615	David Robbins	256	$10,000	$2,463,200
September 16–20	Borgata Poker Open	Borgata Hotel & Casino	Roy Winston	$1,575,280	Heung Yoon	560	$10,000	$5,432,000
September 26–30	Turks & Caicos Poker Classic	Players Club	Rhynie Campbell	$436,675	Erik Cajelais	137	$7,500	$996,675
October 11–16	Spanish Championship	Casino Barcelona	Markus Lehmann	€537,000	Ludovic Lacay	226	€7,500	€1,665,500
October 26-November 2	North American Poker Championship	Fallsview Casino Resort	Scott Clements	C$1,456,585	Jonathan Little	504	C$10,000	C$5,133,335
November 7–13	World Poker Finals	Foxwoods Resort Casino	Mike Vela	$1,704,986	Nick Schulman	575	$10,000	$5,404,075
December 12–18	Five Diamond World Poker Classic	Bellagio Resort & Casino	Eugene Katchalov	$2,482,605	Ted Kearly	626	$15,000	$9,390,000
January 20–24	World Poker Open	Gold Strike Resort and Casino	Brett Faustman	$892,413	Hoyt Corkins	259	$10,000	$2,512,300
January 27–31	Borgata Winter Open	Borgata Hotel & Casino	Gavin Griffin	$1,401,109	David Tran	507	$10,000	$4,917,900
February 23–28	L.A. Poker Classic	Commerce Casino	Phil Ivey	$1,596,100	Quinn Do	665	$10,000	$6,288,000
March 1–3	Celebrity Invitational	Commerce Casino	Van Nguyen	$125,500	Ethan Ruby	445	$0	$225,500
March 10–14	Bay 101 Shooting Star	Bay 101	Brandon Cantu	$1,000,000	Steve Sung	376	$10,000	$3,336,000
March 25–28	World Poker Challenge	Reno Hilton	Lee Markholt	$493,815	Bryan Devonshire	261	$7,500	$1,873,275
April 4–9	Foxwoods Poker Classic	Foxwoods Resort Casino	Erik Seidel	$992,890	Robert Richardson	346	$10,000	$3,230,014
April 19–26	WPT World Championship	Bellagio Resort & Casino	David Chiu	$3,389,140	Gus Hansen	545	$25,000	$13,216,250

- Gus Hansen became the first player to reach heads-up play four times.
- Jonathan Little won WPT Player of the Year for Season 6 (VI).

=== Season 7 (VII) ===
The seventh season of the WPT featured 14 events running from May 2008 to April 2009.

WPT Season 7 (VII) Results
Date	Event	Location	Winner	Prize	Runner-up	Entrants	Buy-in	Prizepool
May 23–27	Spanish Championship	Casino Barcelona	Casper Hansen	€425,000	Stefan Mattsson	253	€5,000	€1,278,396
July 11–17	Bellagio Cup IV	Bellagio Resort & Casino	Mike Watson	$1,673,770	David Benyamine	446	$10,000	$6,489,300
August 23–28	Legends of Poker	Bicycle Casino	John Phan	$1,116,428	Amit Makhija	373	$10,000	$3,520,738
September 14–18	Borgata Poker Open	Borgata Hotel & Casino	Vivek Rajkumar	$1,424,500	Sang Kim	516	$10,000	$5,000,000
October 10–16	North American Poker Championship	Fallsview Casino Resort	Glen Witmer	C$1,250,352	Gavin Smith	454	C$10,000	C$3,374,475
October 20–26	Festa al Lago	Bellagio Resort & Casino	Bertrand Grospellier	$1,411,015	Nam Le	368	$15,000	$5,354,000
November 5–11	World Poker Finals	Foxwoods Resort Casino	Jonathan Little	$1,120,310	Jonathan Jaffe	412	$10,000	$3,876,508
December 13–19	Five Diamond World Poker Classic	Bellagio Resort & Casino	David Rheem	$1,538,730	Justin Young	497	$15,000	$7,231,350
January 14–17	Southern Poker Championship	Beau Rivage	Allen Carter	$1,025,500	Bobby Suer	283	$10,000	$2,662,747
February 21–26	L.A. Poker Classic	Commerce Casino	Cornel Cimpan	$1,686,760	Binh Nguyen	696	$10,000	$6,681,600
February 28 - March 2	Celebrity Invitational	Commerce Casino	Freddy Deeb	$100,000	Nick Gonzalez	433	$0	$200,000
March 16–20	Bay 101 Shooting Star	Bay 101	Steve Brecher	$1,025,500	Kathy Liebert	391	$10,000	$3,714,500
April 3–8	Foxwoods Poker Classic	Foxwoods Resort Casino	Vadim Trincher	$731,079	Amnon Filippi	259	$10,000	$2,436,930
April 18–25	WPT World Championship	Bellagio Resort & Casino	Yevgeniy Timoshenko	$2,143,655	Ran Azor	338	$25,000	$8,172,250

- Bertrand Grospellier won WPT Player of the Year for Season 7 (VII).

=== Season 8 (VIII) ===
The eighth season of the WPT featured 17 events running from May 2009 to April 2010.

WPT Season 8 (VIII) Results
Date	Event	Location	Winner	Prize	Runner-up	Entrants	Buy-in	Prizepool
May 6–10	Venice	Casino di Venezia	Ragnar Astrom	€397,960	Martin Jacobson	397	€4,400	€1,521,340
June 26–30	Spanish Championship	Casino Barcelona	Randal Flowers	€277,000	Per Sjogren	172	€5,300	€860,000
July 13–19	Bellagio Cup V	Bellagio Resort & Casino	Alexandre Gomes	$1,187,670	Faraz Jaka	268	$15,000	$3,899,400
August 22–26	Legends of Poker	Bicycle Casino	Prahlad Friedman	$1,009,000	Kevin Schaffel	279	$10,000	$2,625,000
August 31-September 4	Slovakia	Golden Vegas	Richard Toth	€104,000	Boris Zeleny	100	€4,400	€542,572
September 6–12	Merit Cyprus Classic	Merit Crystal Cove Hotel & Casino	Thomas Bichon	$579,165	Uri Keider	181	$10,300	$1,810,000
September 19–24	Borgata Poker Open	Borgata Hotel & Casino	Olivier Busquet	$925,514	Jeremy Brown	1,018	$3,500	$3,359,400
October 12–19	Marrakech	Casino De Marrakech	Christophe Savary	€377,262	Eoghan O'Dea	416	€4,500	€1,812,000
October 20–26	Festa al Lago	Bellagio Resort & Casino	Tommy Vedes	$1,218,225	Jason Lavallee	275	$15,400	$4,001,250
November 5–10	World Poker Finals	Foxwoods Resort Casino	Cornel Cimpan	$910,058	Soheil Shamseddin	353	$10,000	$3,424,100
December 13–19	Five Diamond World Poker Classic	Bellagio Resort & Casino	Daniel Alaei	$1,428,430	Josh Arieh	329	$15,400	$4,761,450
January 24–27	Southern Poker Championship	Beau Rivage	Hoyt Corkins	$739,486	Jonathan Kantor	208	$10,000	$1,930,000
February 20–21	Celebrity Invitational	Commerce Casino	Leron Washington	$100,000	Sean Urban	567	$0	$200,000
February 26-March 4	L.A. Poker Classic	Commerce Casino	Andras Koroknai	$1,788,001	Raymond Dolan	745	$10,000	$7,152,000
March 8–12	Bay 101 Shooting Star	Bay 101	McLean Karr	$878,500	Andy Seth	333	$10,000	$3,163,500
March 20–24	Hollywood Poker Open	Hollywood Casino Indiana	Carlos Mortensen	$391,212	Mike Mustafa	144	$10,000	$1,331,616
March 27-April 2	Bucharest	Regent Casino	Guillaume Darcourt	€144,530	Simon Münz	161	€3,300	€449,450
April 17–24	WPT World Championship	Bellagio Resort & Casino	David Williams	$1,530,537	Eric Baldwin	195	$25,500	$4,728,750

- Season 8 featured six events held outside North America.
- Carlos Mortensen joined Gus Hansen as the only three-time WPT title winners.
- Faraz Jaka won WPT Player of the Year for Season 8 (VIII).
- Faraz Jaka was the first WPT Player of the Year to not win a WPT title during the season.

=== Season 9 (IX) ===
The ninth season of the WPT featured 21 events running from May 2010 to May 2011.

WPT Season 9 (IX) Results
Date	Event	Location	Winner	Prize	Runner-up	Entrants	Buy-in	Prizepool
May 8–15	Grand Prix de Paris	Aviation Club de France	Theo Jorgensen	€633,902	Antoine Amourette	247	€10,000	€2,347,797
May 19–23	Spanish Championship	Casino Barcelona	Ali Tekintamgac	€315,000	Roberto Garcia Santiago	326	€3,500	€1,034,400
July 11–16	Bellagio Cup VI	Bellagio	Mortiz Kranich	$875,150	Justin Smith	353	$10,300	$3,424,100
August 20–25	Legends of Poker	Bicycle Casino	Andy Frankenberger	$750,000	Kyle Wilson	462	$5,000	$2,151,072
August 30-September 4	London Poker Classic	Palm Beach Casino	Jake Cody	£273,783	Nichlas Mattsson	171	£5,300	£820,800
September 19–24	Borgata Poker Open	Borgata Hotel & Casino	Dwyte Pilgrim	$733,802	Kianoosh Mohajeri	1,042	$3,500	$3,438,600
October 15–20	Festa al Lago	Bellagio Resort & Casino	Randal Flowers	$831,500	Michael Benvenuti	335	$10,300	$3,224,000
October 27-November 2	World Poker Finals	Foxwoods Resort Casino	Jeff Forrest	$548,752	Dave Inselberg	242	$10,000	$2,276,978
November 2–6	Amneville	Casino Tranchant Seven	Sam El Sayed	€426,425	Franck Pepe	543	€3,500	€1,640,000
November 27–30	Marrakech	Casino De Marrakech	Sebastian Homann	€254,745	Guillaume Cescut	222	€5,000	€905,528
December 3–8	Five Diamond World Poker Classic	Bellagio Resort & Casino	Antonio Esfandiari	$870,124	Andrew Robl	438	$10,300	$4,261,267
January 23–27	Southern Poker Championship	Beau Rivage	Alexander Kuzmin	$601,469	Leif Force	214	$10,000	$2,011,600
February 3–8	Venice	Casino di Venezia	Alessio Isaia	€380,000	Szabolcs Mayer	523	€3,300	€1,521,930
February 19–20	Celebrity Invitational	Commerce Casino	Davidi Kitai	$100,000	Almira Skripchenko	482	$0	$200,000
February 25-March 3	L.A. Poker Classic	Commerce Casino	Gregory Brooks	$1,654,120	Vivek Rajkumar	681	$10,000	$6,537,600
March 14–18	Bay 101 Shooting Star	Bay 101	Alan Sternberg	$1,039,000	Steven Kelly	415	$10,000	$3,942,500
March 25–29	Vienna	Montesino	Dmitry Gromov	€447,840	Maxim Kolosov	555	€3,500	€1,776,000
March 30-April 3	Bratislava	Golden Vegas	Roberto Romanello	€140,685	Mayu Roca Uribe		€2,720	
April 9–13	Hollywood Poker Open	Hollywood Casino Indiana	Mike Scarborough	$273,664	Erik Seidel	97	$10,000	$911,800
April 27-May 3	Seminole Hard Rock Showdown	Seminole Hard Rock Hotel & Casino	Taylor von Kriegenbergh	$1,122,340	Curt Kohlberg	433	$10,000	$4,156,800
May 14–20	WPT World Championship	Bellagio Resort & Casino	Scott Seiver	$1,618,344	Farzad Bonyadi	220	$25,500	$5,309,500

- Season 9 featured eight events held outside North America.
- Andy Frankenberger won WPT Player of the Year for Season 9 (IX).

=== Season 10 (X) ===
The 10th season of the WPT featured 22 events running May 2011 to May 2012.

WPT Season 10 (X) Results
Date	Event	Location	Winner	Prize	Runner-up	Entrants	Buy-in	Prizepool
May 25–29	Spanish Championship	Casino Barcelona	Lukas Berglund	€260,000	Romain Matteoli	216	€3,500	€691,200
Jul 17-21	Slovenia	Grand Casino Portorož	Miha Travnik	€102,623	Vincenzo Natale	141	€3,300	€410,244
August 25–30	Legends of Poker	Bicycle Casino	Will Failla	$758,085	Ken Aldridge	757	$3,700	$2,570,015
September 5–10	Grand Prix de Paris	Aviation Club de France	Matthew Waxman	€518,750	Hugo Lemaire	312	€7,500	€2,252,650
September 18–22	Borgata Poker Open	Borgata Hotel & Casino	Bobby Oboodi	$922,441	Jin Hwang	1,313	$3,500	$4,220,161
September 20–24	Malta	Casino at Portomaso	Matt Giannetti	€200,000	Cecilia Pescaglini	240	€3,300	€698,400
October 27-November 1	World Poker Finals	Foxwoods Resort Casino	Daniel Santoro	$449,910	Christian Harder	189	$10,000	$1,778,550
November 1–6	Amneville	Casino Tranchant Seven	Adrien Allain	€336,133	Jordane Ouin	379	€3,500	€1,167,866
November 18–22	Jacksonville	BestBet Poker Room	Tony Ruberto	$325,928	Sam Soverel	393	$3,500	$1,277,250
November 24–27	Marrakech	Casino De Marrakech	Mohamed Ali Houssam	€159,150	Toufik Ourini	272	€3,000	€727,434
December 1–5	Prague	Corinthia Casino	Andrey Pateychuk	€450,000	Adria Balaguer	571	€3,500	€1,753,200
December 6–11	Five Diamond World Poker Classic	Bellagio Resort & Casino	James Dempsey	$821,612	Soi Nguyen	413	$10,300	$4,006,100
December 13–18	Venice	Casino di Venezia	Edoardo Alescio	€194,000	Steve O'Dwyer	213	€3,300	€600,830
January 5–8	Ireland	Citywest Hotel	David Shallow	€222,280	Charles Chattha	338	€2,500	€760,500
February 6–10	Venice Grand Prix	Casino di Venezia	Rinat Bogdanov	€229,800	Alessandro Longobardi	155	€5,445	€678,880
February 10–14	Lucky Hearts Poker Open	Seminole Hard Rock Hotel & Casino	Matt Juttelstad	$268,444	Gigi Gagne	295	$3,500	$958,750
February 24–29	L.A. Poker Classic	Commerce Casino	Sean Jazayeri	$1,370,240	David Sands	549	$10,000	$5,270,400
March 5–9	Bay 101 Shooting Star	Bay 101	Moon Kim	$960,900	Ubaid Habib	364	$10,000	$3,458,000
April 10–15	Vienna	Montesino Casino	Morten Christensen	€313,390	Konstantin Tolokno	396	€3,500	€1,267,200
April 18–23	Seminole Hard Rock Poker Showdown	Seminole Hard Rock Hotel & Casino	Tommy Vedes	$779,520	John Dolan	290	$10,000	$2,784,000
April 27-May 2	Jacksonville bestbet Open	bestbet Jacksonville	Shawn Cunix	$400,600	James Calderaro	320	$5,000	$1,504,000
May 19–26	WPT World Championship	Bellagio Resort & Casino	Marvin Rettenmaier	$1,196,858	Philippe Ktorza	152	$25,500	$3,660,500

- Season 10 featured 11 events held outside North America.
- Joe Serock won WPT Player of the Year for Season 10 (X).
- Joe Serock was the second WPT Player of the Year to not win a WPT title during the season.

=== Season 11 (XI) ===
The 11th season of the WPT featured 24 events running from August 2012 to May 2013.

WPT Season 11 (XI) Results
Date	Event	Location	Winner	Prize	Runner-up	Entrants	Buy-in	Prizepool
August 4–9	Merit Cyprus Classic	Merit Crystal Cove Hotel & Casino	Marvin Rettenmaier	$287,784	Artur Voskanyan	329	$4,400	$1,212,694
August 10–15	Parx Open Poker Classic	Parx Casino	Anthony Gregg	$416,127	Stephen Reynolds	500	$3,500	$1,600,500
August 24–29	Legends of Poker	Bicycle Casino	Josh Hale	$500,000	Max Steinberg	622	$3,700	$2,111,690
September 10–15	Grand Prix de Paris	Aviation Club de France	Matt Salsberg	€400,000	Theo Jorgensen	228	€7,500	€1,624,500
September 16–20	Malta	Casino at Portomaso	Yorane Kerignard	€120,000	Jackson Genovesi	169	€3,300	€643,641
September 16–21	Borgata Poker Open	Borgata Hotel & Casino	Ben Hamnett	$818,847	Matthew Burnitz	1,181	$3,500	$3,897,300
October 22,26	Emperors Palace Poker Classic	Emperors Palace	Dominik Nitsche	$206,153	Jerome Bradpiece	230	$3,600	$759,000
November 9–13	bestbet Jacksonville Fall Poker Scramble	bestbet Jacksonville	Noah Schwartz	$402,972	Byron Kaverman	477	$3,500	$1,526,400
November 12–17	Copenhagen	Casino Copenhagen	Emil Olsson	DKr 1,346,000	Morten Klein	229	DKr 26,250	DKr 5,496,000
November 23–27	Montreal	Playground Poker Club	Jonathan Roy	$784,101	Pascal Lefrancois	1,173	$3,300	$3,387,930
November 27-December 1	Mazagan	Mazagan Beach and Golf Resort	Giacomo Fundaro	€127,707	Frederic Brunet	146	€3,500	€438,253
December 3–9	Prague	Corinthia Casino	Marcin Wydrowski	€325,000	Alexander Lahkov	567	€3,300	€1,684,295
December 4–9	Five Diamond World Poker Classic	Bellagio Resort & Casino	Ravi Raghavan	$1,268,571	Shawn Buchanan	503	$10,300	$4,879,100
January 27-February 1	Borgata Winter Poker Open	Borgata Hotel & Casino	Andy Hwang	$730,053	Jim Anderson	1,042	$3,500	$3,335,442
February 8–12	Lucky Hearts Poker Open	Seminole Hard Rock Hotel & Casino	Matt Giannetti	$323,804	Lily Kiletto	369	$3,500	$1,199,250
February 19–24	Baden	Casino Baden	Vladimir Bozinovic	€271,258	Paul Berende	254	€3,300	€1,031,142
February 23–28	L.A. Poker Classic	Commerce Casino	Paul Klann	$1,004,090	Paul Volpe	517	$10,000	$4,963,200
March 4–8	Bay 101 Shooting Star	Bay 101	WeiKai Chang	$1,138,350	Joe Nguyen	643	$7,500	$4,597,450
March 25–30	Venice Grand Prix	Casino di Venezia	Rocco Palumbo	€180,097	Marcello Montagner	173	€3,300	€519,000
April 5–10	Barcelona	Casino Barcelona	Chanracy Khun	€200,000	Benjamin Pollak	249	€3,500	€796,800
April 11–16	Seminole Hard Rock Poker Showdown	Seminole Hard Rock Hotel & Casino	Kevin Eyster	$660,395	Ben Tarzia	542	$5,000	$2,547,000
April 26–30	bestbet Open	bestbet Jacksonville	Mike Linster	$321,521	David Bell	351	$3,500	$1,123,204
May 3–9	Canadian Spring Championship	Playground Poker Club	Amir Babakhani	C$442,248	Barry Kruger	735	C$3,300	C$2,138,850
May 18–24	WPT World Championship	Bellagio Resort & Casino	David Rheem	$1,150,297	Erick Lindgren	146	$25,000	$3,540,500

- Marvin Rettenmaier was the first player to win back-to-back WPT titles.
- Matt Salsberg won WPT Player of the Year for Season 11 (XI).

=== Season 12 (XII) ===
The 12th season of the WPT featured 21 events running from August 2013 to April 2014.

WPT Season 12 (XII) Results
Date	Event	Location	Winner	Prize	Runner-up	Entrants	Buy-in	Prizepool
August 16–21	Merit Cyprus Classic	Merit Crystal Cove Hotel & Casino	Alexey Rybin	$258,000	Albert Daher	262	$4,400	$1,000,000
August 29-September 4	Legends of Poker	Bicycle Casino	Jordan Cristos	$613,355	Dan Heimiller	716	$3,500	$2,430,820
September 15–20	Borgata Poker Open	Borgata Hotel & Casino	Anthony Zinno	$825,099	Vanessa Selbst	1,189	$3,500	$3,805,989
October 25–30	Grand Prix de Paris	Aviation Club de France	Mohsin Charania	€340,000	Vasili Firsau	187	€7,500	€1,839,496
November 7–11	Emperors Palace Poker Classic	Emperors Palace Hotel Casino	Daniel Brits	$132,128	Eugene Du Plessis	191	$3,600	$561,528
November 15–19	bestbet Jacksonville Fall Poker Scramble	bestbet Jacksonville	Jared Jaffee	$252,749	Blake Purvis	358	$3,500	$1,145,600
November 19–24	Caribbean	Casino Royale	Tony Dunst	$145,000	Giacomo Fundaro	191	$3,500	$592,864
November 29-December 5	Montreal	Playground Poker Club	Derrick Rosenbarger	$500,824	Mukul Pahuja	862	$3,850	$2,738,435
December 6–11	Five Diamond World Poker Classic	Bellagio Resort & Casino	Dan Smith	$1,161,135	Gary Benson	449	$10,300	$4,355,300
December 16-10	Korea	Ramada Plaza Jeju	Masato Yokosawa	$100,000	Chris Park	137	$3,000	$358,803
December 15–21	Prague	Card Casino Prague	Julian Thomas	€206,230	Vasili Firsau	306	€3,300	€881,550
January 26–31	Borgata Winter Poker Open	Borgata Hotel & Casino	Anthony Merulla	$842,379	David Paredes	1,229	$3,500	$3,934,029
February 7–12	Lucky Hearts Poker Open	Seminole Casino Coconut Creek	James Calderaro	$271,103	Shannon Shorr	415	$3,500	$1,348,750
February 22–24	Fallsview Poker Classic	Fallsview Casino Resort	Matthew Lapossie	C$363,197	Dylan Wilkerson	383	C$5,000	C$1,729,510
March 1–6	L.A. Poker Classic	Commerce Casino	Chris Moorman	$1,015,460	Glenn Lafaye	534	$10,000	$5,126,400
March 10–14	Bay 101 Shooting Star	Bay 101	James Carroll	$1,256,550	Dylan Wilkerson	718	$7,500	$5,133,700
March 10–15	Venice Carnival	Casino di Venezia	Andrea Dato	€105,000	Sam Trickett	144	€3,000	€377,136
March 15–19	Thunder Valley	Thunder Valley Casino Resort	J.C. Tran	$302,750	Preston Harwell	465	$3,500	$1,488,000
March 21–25	Jacksonville bestbet Open	bestbet Jacksonville	Nabil Hirezi	$206,041	James Calderaro	258	$3,500	$825,600
April 10–16	Seminole Hard Rock Poker Showdown	Seminole Hard Rock Hotel & Casino	Eric Afriat	$1,081,184	Mukul Pahuja	1,795	$3,500	$5,763,150
April 22–26	WPT World Championship	Borgata Hotel & Casino	Keven Stammen	$1,350,000	Byron Kaverman	328	$15,400	$4,852,400

- Season 12 saw the WPT World Championship relocate to the Borgata Hotel & Casino after the Bellagio hosted the event for the first 11 seasons of the WPT.
- Mukul Pahuja won WPT Player of the Year for Season 12 (XII).
- Mukul Pahuja was the third WPT Player of the Year to not win a WPT title during the season.

=== Season 13 (XIII) ===
The 13th season of the WPT featured 18 events running from August 2014 to April 2015.

WPT Season 13 (XIII) Results
Date	Event	Location	Winner	Prize	Runner-up	Entrants	Buy-in	Prizepool
August 23–29	Legends of Poker	Bicycle Casino	Harry Arutyunyan	$576,369	Mike Eskandari	593	$3,500	$2,172,994
September 5–10	Merit Classic North Cyprus	Merit Crystal Cove Hotel and Casino	Alexander Lakhov	$325,400	Dmitry Gromov	404	$4,400	$1,486,720
September 14–19	Borgata Poker Open	Borgata Hotel & Casino	Darren Elias	$843,744	Kane Kalas	1,226	$3,500	$3,924,426
November 3–7	Caribbean	Casino Royale	Darren Elias	$127,680	Christophe Rosso	118	$3,500	$366,272
November 7–11	bestbet Bounty Scramble	bestbet Jacksonville	Ryan Van Sanford	$421,068	Chris Bolek	461	$5,000	$2,143,652
November 14–16	Emperors Palace Poker Classic	Emperors Palace Hotel Casino	Dylan Wilkerson	$147,509	Richard Barnard	166	$3,500	$547,800
November 18–23	UK	Dusk Till Dwan	Matas Cimbolas	£200,000	Ben Warrington	354	£3,000	£955,800
November 20–26	Montreal	Playground Poker Club	Jonathan Jaffe	C$464,252	Ratharam Sivagnanam	732	C$3,850	C$2,485,140
December 15–20	Five Diamond World Poker Classic	Bellagio Resort & Casino	Mohsin Charania	$1,477,890	Garrett Greer	586	$10,300	$5,684,200
January 25–30	Borgata Winter Poker Open	Borgata Hotel & Casino	Aaron Mermelstein	$712,305	Eugene Todd	989	$3,500	$3,165,789
February 5–11	Lucky Hearts Poker Open	Seminole Hard Rock Hotel & Casino	Brian Altman	$723,008	Mark Dube	1,027	$3,500	$3,286,400
February 13–16	Fallsview Poker Classic	Fallsview Casino Resort	Anthony Zinno	C$380,021	Mark Bailey	419	C$5,000	C$1,910,221
February 28-March 5	L.A. Poker Classic	Commerce Casino	Anthony Zinno	$1,015,860	Mike Leah	538	$10,000	$5,164,800
March 9–13	Bay 101 Shooting Star	Bay 101	Taylor Paur	$1,214,200	Isaac Baron	708	$7,500	$5,062,200
March 12–17	Vienna	Montesino Casino	Konstantinos Nanos	€150,000	Vladimir Krastev	220	€3,300	€660,000
March 14–18	Rolling Thunder	Thunder Valley Casino Resort	Ravee Mathi Sundar	$266,857	Jesse Rockowitz	379	$3,500	$1,212,800
April 16–22	Seminole Hard Rock Poker Showdown	Seminole Hard Rock Hotel & Casino	Griffin Paul	$1,000,000	Joe Ebanks	1,476	$3,500	$5,000,000
April 24–29	WPT World Championship	Borgata Hotel & Casino	Asher Conniff	$973,683	Alexander Lakhov	239	$15,400	$3,462,050

- Legends of Poker featured a $10,000 buy-in on Day 2.
- Darren Elias became the first player to win back-to-back WPT titles in the same season.
- Anthony Zinno won back-to-back WPT titles later in the season.
- Anthony Zinno joined Gus Hansen and Carlos Mortensen as the only three-time WPT title winners.
- Anthony Zinno won WPT Player of the Year for Season 13 (XIII).

=== Season 14 (XIV) ===
The 14th season of the WPT featured 21 events running from May 2015 to April 2016.

WPT Season 14 (XIV) Results
Date	Event	Location	Winner	Prize	Runner-up	Entrants	Buy-in	Prizepool
May 1–6	Canadian Spring Championship	Playground Poker Club	Sheraz Nasir	C$237,390	Lu Zhang	370	C$3,500	C$1,148,480
May 11–16	Amsterdam	Holland Casino	Farid Yachou	€201,000	Steve Warburton	341	€3,300	€992,310
July 31-August 4	Choctaw	Choctaw Casino Resort	Jason Brin	$682,975	Andy Hwang	1,175	$3,700	$3,989,125
August 29-September 4	Legends of Poker	Bicycle Casino	Mike Shariati	$675,942	Freddy Deeb	786	$3,700	$2,630,349
September 20–25	Borgata Poker Open	Borgata Hotel & Casino	David Paredes	$723,227	James Gilbert	1,027	$3,500	$3,287,427
September 25–29	Maryland Live	Maryland Live! Casino	Aaron Mermelstein	$250,222	Xin Wang	337	$3,500	$1,063,000
October 29-November 1	Emperors Palace Poker Classic	Emperors Palace Hotel Casino	Ben Cade	$100,000	Mark Lifman	135	$3,600	$312,030
November 3–8	UK	Dusk Till Dawn	Iaron Lightbourne	£200,000	Craig McCorkell	450	£2,200	£1,000,000
November 6–10	bestbet Poker Scramble	bestbet Jacksonville	Tyler Patterson	$375,270	Benjamin Zamani	412	$5,000	$1,915,800
November 13–19	Montreal	Playground Poker Club	Jared Mahoney	C$453,122	Darryll Fish	697	C$3,850	C$2,366,315
December 1–6	Prague	King's Casino	Javier Gomez	€175,000	Pavel Plesuv	256	€3,300	€730,340
December 14–19	Five Diamond World Poker Classic	Bellagio Resort & Casino	Kevin Eyster	$1,587,382	Bill Jennings	639	$10,400	$6,198,300
January 31-February 5	Borgata Winter Poker Open	Borgata Hotel & Casino	Chris Leong	$816,246	Rafael Yaraliyev	1,171	$3,500	$3,748,371
February 21–24	Fallsview Poker Classic	Fallsview Casino Resort	David Ormsby	C$383,407	Robert Forbes	423	C$5,000	C$1,907,544
February 27-March 3	L.A. Poker Classic	Commerce Casino	Dietrich Fast	$1,000,800	Mike Shariati	515	$10,000	$4,944,000
March 7–11	Bay 101 Shooting Star	Bay 101	Stefan Schillhabel	$1,298,000	Adam Geyer	753	$7,500	$5,138,800
March 12–16	Rolling Thunder	Thunder Valley Casino Resort	Harrison Gimbel	$275,112	Mohsin Charania	409	$3,500	$1,308,800
March 15–20	Vienna	Montesino Casino	Vlad Darie	€170,800	Zoltan Gal	234	€3,300	€680,940
April 14–20	Seminole Hard Rock Poker Showdown	Seminole Hard Rock Hotel & Casino	Justin Young	$669,161	Garrett Greer	1,222	$3,500	$3,910,400
April 17–21	Seminole Hard Rock Poker Finale	Seminole Hard Rock Hotel & Casino	David Rheem	$705,885	Aditya Prasetyo	342	$10,000	$3,249,000
April 22–24	WPT Tournament of Champions	Seminole Hard Rock Hotel & Casino	Farid Yachou	$381,600	Vlad Darie	64	$15,400	$1,060,000

- The WPT World Championship became the WPT Tournament of Champions where only past WPT champions were allowed to enter.
- Season XIV winners received free entry into the WPT Tournament of Champions for that year.
- David "Chino" Rheem joined Gus Hansen, Carlos Mortensen, and Anthony Zinno as the only three-time WPT title winners
- Mike Shariati won WPT Player of the Year for Season 14 (XIV).

=== Season 15 (XV) ===
The 15th season of the WPT featured 21 events running from April 2016 to April 2017.

WPT Season 15 (XV) Results
Date	Event	Location	Winner	Prize	Runner-up	Entrants	Buy-in	Prizepool
April 29-May 5	Canadian Spring Championship	Playground Poker Club	Seth Davies	C$274,540	Ruben Perceval	417	C$3,500	C$1,293,768
May 10–14	Amsterdam	Holland Casino	Andjelko Andrejevic	€200,000	Tomas Fara	318	€3,300	€911,880
July 29-August 2	Choctaw	Choctaw Casino Resort	James Mackey	$666,758	Benjamin Zamani	1,066	$3,700	$3,619,070
August 27-September 1	Legends of Poker	Bicycle Casino	Pat Lyons	$615,346	Benjamin Zamani	687	$4,000	$2,465,643
September 18–23	Borgata Poker Open	Borgata Hotel & Casino	Jesse Sylvia	$821,811	Zach Gruneberg	1,179	$3,500	$3,773,979
October 1–5	Maryland Live!	Maryland Live! Casino	Zachary Smiley	$356,536	Ryan Belz	554	$3,500	$1,772,800
October 14–18	bestbet Bounty Scramble	bestbet Jacksonville	Sam Panzica	$354,335	Richard Malone Jr.	379	$5,000	$1,762,350
October 31-November 6	UK	Dusk Till Dawn	Luis Rodriguez Cruz	£200,000	Chris Yong	522	£2,200	£1,044,000
November 11–17	Montreal	Playground Poker Club	Mike Sexton	C$425,980	Benny Chen	648	C$3,850	C$2,199,960
November 19–23	Caribbean	Hard Rock Hotel & Casino Punta Cana	Niall Farrell	$335,000	Troy Quenneville	323	$5,000	$1,456,892
December 2–6	Prague	Hotel Grandior	Oleg Vasylchenko	€132,200	Anton Petrov	167	€3,300	€551,100
December 5–10	Five Diamond World Poker Classic	Bellagio Resort & Casino	James Romero	$1,938,118	Ryan Tosoc	791	$10,400	$7,672,700
January 29-February 3	Borgata Winter Poker Open	Borgata Hotel & Casino	Daniel Weinman	$892,433	Nathan Bjerno	1,312	$3,500	$4,199,712
February 10–15	Playground	Playground Poker Club	Ema Zajmović	C$261,000	Jean-Francois Bouchard	380	C$3,500	C$1,179,520
February 22–24	Fallsview Poker Classic	Fallsview Casino Resort	Darren Elias	C$429,384	David Eldridge	489	C$5,000	C$2,229,954
February 25-March 2	L.A. Poker Classic	Commerce Casino	Daniel Strelitz	$1,001,110	Simeon Naydenov	521	$10,000	$5,001,600
March 6–10	Bay 101 Shooting Star	Bay 101	Sam Panzica	$1,373,000	Anthony Spinella	806	$7,500	$5,722,600
March 11–15	Rolling Thunder	Thunder Valley Casino Resort	Mike Del Vecchio	$284,638	Sorel Mizzi	421	$3,500	$1,347,200
March 31-April 5	Seminole Hard Rock Poker Showdown	Seminole Hard Rock Hotel & Casino	Tony Sinishtaj	$661,283	Darryll Fish	1,207	$3,500	$3,862,400
April 2–6	Seminole Hard Rock Poker Finale	Seminole Hard Rock Hotel & Casino	Ryan Riess	$716,088	Alan Sternberg	349	$10,000	$3,315,500
April 7–9	WPT Tournament of Champions	Seminole Hard Rock Hotel & Casino	Daniel Weinman	$381,500	Michael Mizrachi	66	$15,000	$1,090,000

- Only past WPT champions were allowed to enter the WPT Tournament of Champions.
- Season XV winners received free entry into the WPT Tournament of Champions for that year.
- Ema Zajmović was the first female to win an open WPT event.
- Benjamin Zamani won WPT Player of the Year for Season 15 (XV).
- Benjamin Zamani was the fourth WPT Player of the Year to not win a WPT title during the season

=== Season 16 (XVI) ===
The 16th season of the WPT featured 20 events running from April 2017 to May 2018.

WPT Season 16 (XVI) Results
Date	Event	Location	Winner	Prize	Runner-up	Entrants	Buy-in	Prizepool
April 15–19	Beijing	NUO Hotel	Pete Chen	CNY 2,063,454	Ke Chen	400	Invitational	CNY 9,600,000
May 9–13	Amsterdam	Holland Casino	Daniel Daniyar	€152,600	Louis Salter	224	€3,300	€672,000
August 4–8	Choctaw	Choctaw Casino Resort	Jay Lee	$593,173	Jeb Hutton	924	$3,700	$3,121,980
August 25–31	Legends of Poker	Bicycle Casino	Art Papazyan	$668,692	Phil Hellmuth	763	$4,000	$2,738,407
September 17–22	Borgata Poker Open	Borgata Hotel & Casino	Guo Liang Chen	$789,058	Gregory Weber	1,132	$3,500	$3,623,532
September 30-October 4	Maryland at Live! Casino	Maryland Live! Casino	Art Papazyan	$389,405	Zachary Donovan	561	$3,500	$2,000,000
October 21–25	bestbet Bounty Scramble	bestbet Jacksonville	Paul Petraglia	$315,732	Sam Panzica	323	$5,000	$1,501,950
November 10–16	Montreal	Playground Poker Club	Maxime Heroux	C$403,570	Pat Quinn	606	C$3,850	C$2,057,370
December 5–10	Five Diamond World Poker Classic	Bellagio Resort & Casino	Ryan Tosoc	$1,958,065	Alex Foxen	812	$10,400	$7,876,400
January 12–15	European Championship	Casino Spielbank	Ole Schemion	€218,435	Michal Mrakes	339	€3,300	€1,000,000
January 19–24	Lucky Hearts Poker Open	Seminole Hard Rock Hotel & Casino	Darryll Fish	$511,604	Aleksandr Shevelev	911	$3,500	$2,915,200
January 28-February 2	Borgata Winter Poker Open	Borgata Hotel & Casino	Eric Afriat	$651,928	Justin Zaki	1,244	$3,500	$3,967,000
February 10–12	Fallsview Poker Classic	Fallsview Casino Resort	Mike Leah	C$451,821	Ryan Yu	517	C$5,000	C$2,337,803
February 24-March 1	L.A. Poker Classic	Commerce Casino	Dennis Blieden	$1,000,000	Toby Lewis	493	$10,000	$4,681,035
March 2–6	Rolling Thunder	Thunder Valley Casino Resort	David Larson	$295,128	Ian Steinman	440	$3,500	$1,408,000
April 13–18	Seminole Hard Rock Poker Showdown	Seminole Hard Rock Hotel & Casino	Scott Margereson	$696,740	Faraz Jaka	1,309	$3,500	$4,188,800
April 16–20	Amsterdam	Holland Casino	Rens Feenstra	€156,370	Ema Zajmović	207	€3,300	€590,170
May 1–6	Bellagio Elite Poker Championship	Bellagio Resort & Casino	Larry Greenberg	$378,879	Danny Qutami	126	$10,400	$1,220,200
May 20–23	Bobby Baldwin Classic	ARIA Resort & Casino	Darren Elias	$387,580	Kitty Kuo	162	$10,000	$1,555,200
May 24–26	WPT Tournament of Champions	ARIA Resort & Casino	Matthew Waxman	$463,375	Matas Cimbolas	80	$15,000	$1,365,000

- The WPT Tournament of Champions relocated from Seminole Hard Rock Hotel & Casino to ARIA Resort & Casino.
- Only past WPT champions were allowed to enter the WPT Tournament of Champions.
- Season XVI winners received free entry into the WPT Tournament of Champions for that year.
- Darren Elias became the first player to win four WPT titles.
- Art Papazyan won WPT Player of the Year for Season 16 (XVI).

=== Season 17 (XVII) ===
The 17th season of the WPT featured 20 events running from July 2018 to June 2019.

WPT Season 17 (XVII) Results
Date	Event	Location	Winner	Prize	Runner-up	Entrants	Buy-in	Prizepool
July 21–26	Gardens Poker Festival	Gardens Casino	Simon Lam	$565,055	Jake Schindler	584	$5,000	$2,944,800
August 3–7	Choctaw	Choctaw Casino Resort	Brady Holiman	$469,185	Viet Vo	755	$3,700	$2,548,225
September 16–21	Borgata Poker Open	Borgata Hotel & Casino	Erkut Yilmaz	$575,112	T.K. Miles	1,075	$3,500	$3,441,075
September 21–25	Maryland at Live! Casino	Maryland Live! Casino	Tony Ruberto	$344,755	Shankar Pillai	554	$3,500	$1,757,800
October 19–23	bestbet Bounty Scramble	bestbet Jacksonville	Tony Tran	$341,486	Jake Schwartz	356	$5,000	$1,648,280
October 28-November 4	Montreal	Playground Poker Club	Patrick Serda	C$855,000	Ema Zajmović	792	C$5,300	C$5,000,000
November 23–28	Seminole Rock 'N' Roll Poker Open	Seminole Hard Rock Hotel & Casino	Pavel Plesuv	$504,820	James Gilbert	898	$3,500	$2,873,600
December 11–15	Five Diamond World Poker Classic	Bellagio Resort & Casino	Dylan Linde	$1,631,468	Milos Skrbic	1,001	$10,400	$9,709,700
January 12–16	Gardens Poker Championship	Gardens Casino	Frank Stepuchin	$548,825	Shannon Shorr	253	$10,000	$2,428,800
January 21–27	Russia	Casino Sochi	Denys Shafikov	RUS 16,800,000	Aleksey Gortikov	503	RUS 198,000	RUS 86,815,190
January 27–31	Borgata Winter Poker Open	Borgata Hotel & Casino	Vinicius Lima	$728,430	Dave Farah	1,415	$3,500	$4,529,415
February 23–25	Fallsview Poker Classic	Fallsview Casino Resort	Demo Kiriopoulos	C$517,424	Wing Yeung	602	C$5,000	C$2,744,518
March 2–6	L.A. Poker Classic	Commerce Casino	David Baker	$1,015,000	Matas Cimbolas	546	$10,000	$5,169,270
March 8–12	Rolling Thunder	Thunder Valley Casino Resort	Erkut Yilmaz	$303,920	Jim Collopy	280	$5,000	$1,302,000
March 11–17	Barcelona	Casino Barcelona	Vitalijs Zavorotnijs	€600,000	Boris Kolev	1,227	€3,300	€3,570,570
March 22–26	WPT at Venetian	The Venetian Las Vegas	Ben Palmer	$431,655	Tony Gargano	734	$3,500	$2,333,800
April 12–16	Seminole Hard Rock Poker Showdown	Seminole Hard Rock Hotel & Casino	James Carroll	$715,175	Eric Afriat	1,360	$3,500	$4,352,000
May 17–20	Choctaw	Choctaw Casino Resort	Craig Varnell	$379,990	Will Berry	577	$3,700	$1,958,915
May 27–31	ARIA Summer Championship	ARIA Resort & Casino	Matthew Wantman	$443,475	Igor Kurganov	192	$10,000	$1,824,000
June 1–3	WPT Tournament of Champions	ARIA Resort & Casino	Ole Schemion	$440,395	Tony Dunst	76	$15,000	$1,290,000

- Five final tables played out at the HyperX Esports Arena at Luxor Las Vegas. They included the L.A. Poker Classic (March 11), Gardens Poker Championship (March 12), Borgata Winter Poker Open (March 13), Seminole Hard Rock Poker Showdown (May 30), and WPT Choctaw (May 31).
- Only past WPT champions were allowed to enter the WPT Tournament of Champions.
- Season XVII winners received free entry into the WPT Tournament of Champions for that year.
- Erkut Yilmaz won WPT Player of the Year for Season 17 (XVII)

=== Season 18 (XVIII) ===
The 18th season of the WPT would begin in July 2019 and be extended through 2021 as a result of the COVID-19 pandemic.

WPT Season 18 (XVIII) Results
Date	Event	Location	Winner	Prize	Runner-up	Entrants	Buy-in	Prizepool
July 20–25	Gardens Poker Festival	Gardens Casino	Roger Teska	$368,475	Laszlo Molnar	373	$5,000	$1,753,100
August 31-September 4	Legends of Poker	Bicycle Casino	Aaron Van Blarcum	$474,390	Gueorgui Gantchev	520	$5,000	$2,392,000
September 15–20	Borgata Poker Open	Borgata Hotel & Casino	Donald Maloney	$616,186	Uke Dauti	1,156	$3,500	$3,700,356
September 28-October 2	Maryland at Live! Casino	Live! Casino & Hotel	Nitis Udornpim	$319,415	Stephen Deutsch	495	$3,500	$1,584,000
October 2–6	UK	Dusk Till Dawn	Simon Brandstrom	$330,000	Ryan Mandara	690	$3,300	$2,007,900
October 11–15	bestbet Bounty Scramble	bestbet Jacksonville	Josh Adkins	$331,480	Tan Nguyen	349	$5,000	$1,615,870
October 29-November 3	Montreal	Playground Poker Club	Geoffrey Hum	C$500,000	Adedapo Ajayi	1,109	C$3,300	C$3,327,000
November 29-December 4	Seminole Rock 'N' Roll Poker Open	Seminole Hard Rock Hotel & Casino	Milen Stefanov	$545,070	Fabian Gumz	988	$3,500	$3,161,600
December 16–21	Five Diamond World Poker Classic	Bellagio Resort & Casino	Alex Foxen	$1,694,995	Toby Joyce	1,035	$10,400	$10,039,500
January 9–13	Gardens Poker Championship	Gardens Casino	Markus Gonsalves	$554,495	Tuan Phan	257	$10,000	$2,467,200
January 17–22	Lucky Hearts Poker Open	Seminole Hard Rock Hotel & Casino	Brian Altman	$482,636	John Dollinger	843	$3,500	$2,697,600
January 21–26	Russia	Casino Sochi	Aleksey Badulin	RUB 16,257,000	Vlada Stojanovic	489	RUB 210,000	RUB 95,500,000
January 26–30	Borgata Winter Poker Open	Borgata Hotel & Casino	Veerab Zakarian	$674,840	James Anderson	1,290	$3,500	$4,129,290
February 18–23	Germany	King's Resort	Christopher Puetz	€270,000	Laszlo Papai	510	€3,300	€1,453,500
February 21–23	Fallsview Poker Classic	Fallsview Casino Resort	Eric Afriat	C$508,021	Marc-Olivier Carpentier-Perrault	594	C$5,000	C$2,687,946
February 29-March 4	L.A. Poker Classic	Commerce Casino	Balakrishna Patur	$1,015,000	Matas Cimbolas	490	$10,000	$4,727,550
March 7–10	Rolling Thunder	Thunder Valley Casino Resort	Tony Tran	$279,270	Jake Schwartz	250	$5,000	$1,162,000
May 10–20	Online Championship	partypoker	Christian Jeppsson	$923,786	Viktor Ustimov	2,130	$3,200	$6,390,000
August 1–4	World Championship 8-Max	partypoker	Gavin Cochrane	$540,664	Thomas Boivin	1,062	$3,200	$3,186,000
August 8–11	World Championship 6-Max	partypoker	Nick Petrangelo	$494,550	Artsiom Prostak	999	$3,200	$3,000,000
August 15–18	World Championship Knockout	partypoker	Daniel Smyth	$408,330	Manig Löser	1,035	$3,200	$3,105,000
August 22–25	World Championship Mix-Max	partypoker	Andrey Kotelnikov	$488,508	Stuart Guite	989	$3,200	$3,000,000
September 6–16	World Championship Main Event	partypoker	Phillip Mighall	$1,715,667	Teun Mulder	1,011	$10,300	$10,110,000
December 27–29	Online Poker Open	partypoker	Soheb Porbandarwala	$239,820	Balakrishna Patur	395	$3,500	$1,265,000
January 22–26	Lucky Hearts Poker Open	Seminole Hard Rock Hotel & Casino	Ilyas Muradi	$809,515	Robel Andemichael	1,573	$3,500	$5,033,600
January 17–27	Montreal Online	partypoker	Jack Hardcastle	$447,859	Rayan Chamas	888	$3,200	$2,644,000
February 23–28	Russia	Casino Sochi	Maksim Sekretarev	RUB 11,996,600	Andrey Volkov	251	RUB 245,000	RUB 54,247,551
March 5–9	WPT at Venetian	The Venetian Las Vegas	Qing Liu	$752,880	Joe McKeehen	937	$5,000	$4,333,625
April 23–27	Seminole Hard Rock Poker Showdown	Seminole Hard Rock Hotel & Casino	Brek Schutten	$1,261,085	Steven Snyder	2,482	$3,500	$7,942,400

- Brian Altman became the first player to win the same event twice winning WPT Lucky Hearts Poker Open in Season 13 (XIII) and Season 18 (XVIII).
- The Gardens Poker Championship, Borgata Winter Poker Open, and L.A. Poker Classic each reached a final table that was to be played out at HyperX Esports Arena at Luxor Las Vegas, but due to the COVID-19 pandemic, they were indefinitely delayed.
- In March 2020, the WPT announced their first-ever online series to be held on partypoker.
- The Gardens Poker Championship concluded from the PokerGO Studio on March 10, 2021.
- Brian Altman won WPT Player of the Year for Season 18 (XVIII).

=== Season 19 (XIX) ===
The 19th season of the WPT would begin in May 2021.

WPT Season 19 (XIX) Results
Date	Event	Location	Winner	Prize	Runner-up	Entrants	Buy-in	Prizepool
May 23 - June 2	Online Series Main Event	partypoker	Christian Rudolph	$487,443	Fabiano Kovalski	1,065	$3,200	$3,195,000
June 18–22	Seminole Hard Rock Tampa	Seminole Hard Rock Hotel & Casino	Brian Altman	$613,225	Gabriel Abusada	1,165	$3,500	$3,728,000
July 2–7	WPT Venetian	The Venetian Las Vegas	Chad Eveslage	$910,370	Mike Liang	1,199	$5,000	$3,000,000 GTD
July 23–27	WPT Choctaw	Choctaw Casino Resort	Dapo Ajayi	$558,610	Viet Vo	964	$3,700	$3,272,780
August 29 - September 14	World Online Championships	partypoker	Rok Gostisa	$959,493	David Peters	1,179	$5,300	$5,895,000
September 19–21	WPT Online Borgata Poker Open	partypoker	Orson Young	$195,748	"justliberto"	305	$3,500	$1,000,000
November 26–30	Seminole Rock 'N' Roll Poker Open	Seminole Hard Rock Hotel & Casino	Gediminas Uselis	$778,490	Jacob Ferro	1,566	$3,500	$5,011,200
December 15–19	Five Diamond World Poker Classic	Bellagio Resort & Casino	Taylor Black	$1,241,430	Vikenty Shegal	716	$10,400	$6,945,200

- Brian Altman became the seventh player to win three WPT titles when he won the inaugural WPT Seminole Hard Rock Tampa.
- WPT bestbet Scramble and WPT Maryland at Live! Casino were cancelled due to COVID-19 concerns.
- Season 19 (XIX) would end following the conclusion of the WPT Five Diamond World Poker Classic and reset to a calendar basis for Season 20 (XX).
- Jacob Ferro won WPT Player of the Year for Season 19 (XIX).

=== Season 2022 ===
The 20th season of the WPT began in January 2022 and was rebranded from using roman numerals to the calendar year.

WPT Season 2022 Results
Date	Event	Location	Winner	Prize	Runner-up	Entrants	Buy-in	Prize Pool
January 21–26	Lucky Hearts Poker Open	Seminole Hard Rock Hotel & Casino	Alexander Yen	$975,240	Anton Wigg	1,982	$3,500	$6,342,400
April 8–12	Seminole Hard Rock Poker Showdown	Seminole Hard Rock Hotel & Casino	Mark Davis	$1,000,300	Darren Elias	2,010	$3,500	$6,432,000
May 13–16	WPT Choctaw	Choctaw Casino Resort	Chance Kornuth	$486,600	Steve Buckner	787	$3,800	$2,754,500
July 12–17	WPT Venetian Las Vegas	The Venetian Resort Las Vegas	Robert Mizrachi	$894,100	Mike Vanier	1,178	$5,000	$5,418,800
August 27 - September 1	Legends of Poker	Bicycle Casino	Joshua Pollock	$473,350	Ray Qartomy	642	$5,250	$3,113,700
September 2–7	Seminole Hard Rock Tampa	Seminole Hard Rock Hotel & Casino	Corey Wade	$471,686	Fred Paradis	1,165	$3,500	$3,728,000
September 23–27	WPT Australia	The Star Gold Coast	David Tang	AU$425,712	Po Ho	710	AU$5,400	AU$3,550,000
October 19–23	Five Diamond World Poker Classic	Bellagio Resort & Casino	Chad Eveslage	$1,042,300	Steve Buckner	569	$10,400	$5,519,300
November 25–30	Seminole Rock 'N' Roll Poker Open	Seminole Hard Rock Hotel & Casino	Andrew Wilson	$785,800	Josh Kay	1,541	$3,500	$4,931,200
December 12–18	World Championship at Wynn Las Vegas	Wynn Las Vegas	Eliot Hudon	$4,136,000	Benny Glaser	2,960	$10,400	$29,008,000

- Season 20 (XX) would introduce a new points system that would include all WPT-sponsored events.
- The WPT World Championship returned for the first time since Season 13 (XIII) at the new location of Wynn Las Vegas.
- The WPT World Championship would also feature the biggest prize pool guarantee in WPT history at $15,000,000.
- For the first time since Season 1 (I), the WPT Five Diamond World Poker Classic wasn't held in December as it was moved to October.
- Chad Eveslage won WPT Player of the Year for Season 20 (XX).

=== Season 2023 ===
The 21st season of the WPT began in April 2023.

WPT Season 2023 Results
Date	Event	Location	Winner	Prize	Runner-up	Entrants	Buy-in	Prize Pool
April 1–4	WPT Rolling Thunder	Thunder Valley Casino Resort	Scott Eskenazi	$361,660	Jeremy Joseph	590	$3,500	$1,888,000
April 28 - May 2	WPT Seminole Hard Rock Poker Showdown	Seminole Hard Rock Hotel & Casino	Bin Weng	$1,128,250	Sridhar Sangannagari	2,290	$3,500	$7,328,000
May 5–8	WPT Choctaw	Choctaw Casino Resort	Jared Jaffee	$400,740	Dojie Ignacio	612	$3,800	$2,142,000
May 21–25	WPT Gardens Poker Championship	Gardens Casino	Ky Nguyen	$357,380	Ryan Salunga	346	$5,250	$1,678,100
September 22–27	WPT Australia	The Star Gold Coast	Richard Lee	AU$854,890	Martin Kozlov	600	AU$8,000	AU$4,500,000
November 10–14	WPT bestbet Scramble	bestbet Jacksonville	Frederic Normand	$351,650	Heng Zhang	365	$5,000	$1,660,750
November 24–29	WPT Seminole Rock 'N' Roll Poker Open	Seminole Hard Rock Hotel & Casino	Istvan Briski	$647,300	Rayan Chamas	1,447	$3,500	$4,630,400
December 12–21	WPT World Championship at Wynn Las Vegas	Wynn Las Vegas	Daniel Sepiol	$5,678,000	Georgios Sotiropoulos	3,835	$10,400	$40,000,000

- The WPT EveryOne for One Drop was held at Wynn Las Vegas in July, but was not considered as a WPT Main Tour stop for Season 21. The event was won by Bin Weng for $2,227,054.
- The WPT World Championship would set the record for biggest prize pool guarantee in poker history of $40,000,000.
- Bin Weng won WPT Player of the Year for Season 2023.

=== Season 2024 ===
The 22nd season of the WPT began in January 2024.
Full WPT Season 2024 schedule at The Hendom Mob

WPT Season 2024 Results
Date	Event	Location	Winner	Prize	Runner-up	Entrants	Buy-in	Prize Pool
January 25–29	WPT Cambodia Championship	NagaWorld Integrated Resort	Konstantin Held	$361,310	Joshua Mccully	760	$3,500	$2,432,760
March 23–26	WPT Rolling Thunder	Thunder Valley Casino Resort	Casey Sandretto	$246,600	Michael Kinney	458	$3,500	$1,465,600
April 1–3	WPT Voyage	Virgin Voyages Cruise	Aram Oganyan	$214,245	Carlo Basurto	293	$5,000	$1,347,800
April 19–23; FT May 29	WPT Seminole Hard Rock Poker Showdown	Seminole Hard Rock Hotel & Casino	Joshua Reichard	$839.300	Landon Tice	1,869	$3,500	$5,980,800
May 3–6	WPT Choctaw Championship	Choctaw Casino Resort	James Mackey	$361,600	Eric Afriat	603	$3,800	$2,110,500
May 16–22	WPT Montreal Championship	Playground Poker Club Kahnawake	David Dongwoo Ko	C$434,900	Dan Stavila	882	C$3,500	C$2,822,400
July 18–22	WPT Cambodia	NagaWorld Integrated Resort	Sha Chengchun	$187,772	Xiaosheng Zheng	913	$1,300	$1,040,592
September 20–25	WPT Australia	The Star Gold Coast	James Obst	AU$585,359	Travis Endersby	396	AU$8,000	AU$2,930,400
October 24–30	WPT Playground	Playground Poker Club Kahnawake	Michael Wang	C$412,300	Santiago Plante	840	C$3,500	C$2,688,000
November 15–19	WPT bestbet Scramble	bestbet Jacksonville	Nick Yunis	$315,791	Yunkyu Song	361	$5,000	$1,642,550
November 15–21	WPT Korea	Landing Casino, Jeju	Chenxiang Miao	KRW300,000,000	Dingding Guan	667	KRW2,500,000	KRW1,680,000,000
November 29- December 4	WPT Seminole Rock 'N' Roll Poker Open	Seminole Hard Rock Hotel & Casino	Dylan Smith	$662,200	Matthew Beinner	1,435	$3,500	$4,592,000
December 3–21	WPT World Championship at Wynn Las Vegas	Wynn Las Vegas	Scott Stewart	$2,563,900	Rob Sherwood	2,392	$10,400	$23,441,600

- The WPT Voyage Championship was held on Virgin Voyages' Valiant Lady cruise ship sailing from Miami, Florida, with stops in Grand Cayman and Bimini, Bahamas. It was the first WPT event hosted on a cruise ship since Season 3's PartyPoker Million IV.
- The event WPT Seminole Hard Rock Poker Showdown has 2 steps. Step 1 April 19–23 and Step 2 - Final Table in Las Vegas on May 29, 2024.

=== Season 2025 ===
The 23 season of the WPT began in February 2025.
Full WPT Season 23 (2025) schedule at The Hendom Mob

WPT Season 2025 Results
Date	Event	Location	Winner	Prize	Runner-up	Entrants	Buy-in	Prize Pool
February 19–24	WPT Cambodia Championship	NagaWorld Integrated Resort	Artem Vezhenkov	$390,650	Ronald Haverkamp	750	$3,500	$2,400,750
March 16–19	WPT Rolling Thunder	Thunder Valley Casino Resort	Shawn Daniels	$257,600	Harvey Castro	404	$3,500	$1,292,800
April 4–8	WPT Seminole Hard Rock Poker Showdown	Seminole Hard Rock Hotel & Casino	Arthur Peacock	$776,000	Mihai Niste	1,755	$3,500	$5,616,000
May 2–5	WPT Choctaw Championship	Choctaw Casino Resort	Mike Vanier	$338,000	Mason Vieth	586	$3,800	$2,051,000
July 11–17	WPT Venetian Las Vegas Championship	The Venetian Las Vegas	Nicolás Betbesé	$706,960	Francis Cruz	1,153	$5,000	$5,303,800
August 13–18	WPT Cyprus Championship	Chamada Prestige Hotel & Spa	Ilia Kitsbabahvili	$401,100	James Mahone	775	$3,500	$2,402,500
September 27-October 1	WPT Australia	The Star, Sydney	Alan Pham	$364,958	Jordan Bautista	600	$5,500	$1,961,000
October 25–29	WPT Bay 101 Shooting Star Championship	Bay 101	Kharlin Sued	$480,700	Danny Wong	672	$5,300	$3,028,100
November 14–18	WPT bestbet Scramble	bestbet Jacksonville	Connor Rash	$315,350	Dylan Smith	327	$5,000	$1,487,850
November 28- December 3	WPT Seminole Rock 'N' Roll Poker Open	Seminole Hard Rock Hotel & Casino	Kevin Nee	$605,100	Joel Gola	1,224	$3,500	$3,916,800
December 13–19	WPT World Championship at Wynn Las Vegas	Wynn Las Vegas	Schuyler Thornton	$2,258,856	Soheb Porbandarwala	1,865	$10,400	$18,277,000

=== Season 2026 ===
The 24 season of the WPT began in January 2026.
Full WPT Season 24 (2026) schedule at The Hendom Mob

WPT Season 2026 Results
Date	Event	Winner	Prize	Runner-up	Entrants	Buy-in	Prize Pool
January; 16–20	WPT Lucky Hearts Poker Open Championship; Seminole Hard Rock Hollywood	(Venezuela) Giuseppe Iadisernia	$611,700	(United States) Jorge Gomez	1,229	$3,500	$3,932,800
February; 4–9	WPT Cambodia Championship; NagaWorld Integrated Resort	(China) Xiaosheng Zheng	$244.500	(Republic of Ireland) Michael O’Neill	425	$3,500	$1,500,000
February; 19-24	WPT Venetian Las Vegas Spring Championship; The Venetian Las Vegas	(United States) Nicholas Seward	$418,700	(United States) Gregory Brown	488	$5,000	$2,244,800
March 29- April 1	WPT Rolling Thunder Championship; Thunder Valley Casino Resort	(United States) Alexander Farahi	$193,725	(Canada) Matthew Salsberg	310	$3,500	$992,000
April; 24-28	WPT Seminole Hard Rock Poker Showdown (SHRPS); Seminole Hard Rock Hollywood	(United States) Ian Cohen	$656,200	(United States) Richard Seymour	1,417	$3,500	$4,534,000
August; 19-24	WPT Cyprus Championship; Chamada Prestige Hotel & Spa	(Iran) Fabrod Nazari	$368,900	(Lebanon) Shadi Rizk	520	$3,500	$2,000,000
September; 4-9	WPT bestbet Scramble Championship bestbet Jacksonville	(United States) Blake Ellinghaus	$294,900	(United States) Jared Reinstein	294	$5,000	$1,337,700
September; 24-30	WPT Australia Championship; The Star, Sydney	(Australia) Alex Thompson	$316,997	(Australia) Filip Radic	527	$5,000	$1,693,745
October; 23-27	WPT Bay 101 Shooting Star Championship; Bay 101 Casino					$5,300	
November; 5-10	WPT Venetian Las Vegas Fall Championship; The Venetian Las Vegas					$5,000	
December 13–20	WPT World Championship; Wynn Las Vegas					tbc	

== Multiple World Poker Tour champions ==
Darren Elias holds the record for most WPT titles with four after he broke a five-way tie with Carlos Mortensen, David "Chino" Rheem, Gus Hansen, and Anthony Zinno after winning the Season 16 (XVI) WPT Bobby Baldwin Classic for $387,580.

Player	WPT Titles	First Title	Second Title	Third Title	Fourth Title
Darren Elias	4	Season 13 (XIII): Borgata Poker Open	Season 13 (XIII) WPT Caribbean	Season 15 (XV): Fallsview Poker Classic	Season 16 (XVI): Bobby Baldwin Classic
Gus Hansen	3	Season 1 (I): Five Diamond World Poker Classic	Season 1 (I): L.A. Poker Classic	Season 2 (II): Caribbean Poker Adventure	
Carlos Mortensen	3	Season 3 (III): Doyle Brunson North American Poker Championship	Season 5 (V): WPT World Championship	Season 8 (VIII): Hollywood Poker Open	
Anthony Zinno	3	Season 12 (XII): Borgata Poker Open	Season 13 (XIII): Fallsview Poker Classic	Season 13 (XIII): L.A. Poker Classic	
David Rheem	3	Season 7 (VII): Five Diamond World Poker Classic	Season 11 (XI): WPT World Championship	Season 14 (XIV): Seminole Hard Rock Poker Finale	
Eric Afriat	3	Season 12 (XII): Seminole Hard Rock Poker Showdown	Season 16 (XVI): Borgata Winter Poker Open	Season 18 (XVIII): Fallsview Poker Classic	
Brian Altman	3	Season 13 (XIII): Lucky Hearts Poker Open	Season 18 (XVIII): Lucky Hearts Poker Open	Season 19 (XIX): Seminole Hard Rock Tampa	
Howard Lederer	2	Season 1 (I): World Poker Finals	Season 1 (I): Party Poker Million II		
Erick Lindgren	2	Season 2 (II): Ultimate Poker Classic	Season 2 (II): PartyPoker Million III		
Daniel Negreanu	2	Season 3 (III): Borgata Poker Open	Season 3 (III): Five Diamond World Poker Classic		
Tuan Le	2	Season 3 (III): Foxwoods World Poker Finals	Season 3 (III): WPT World Championship		
Michael Mizrachi	2	Season 3 (III): L.A. Poker Classic	Season 4 (IV): Borgata Poker Classic		
Alan Goehring	2	Season 1 (I): WPT World Championship	Season 4 (IV): L.A. Poker Classic		
Barry Greenstein	2	Season 2 (II) World Poker Open	Season 4 (IV): WPT Invitational		
Scott Clements	2	Season 5 (V): Canadian Open Championship	Season 6 (VI): North American Poker Championship		
Jonathan Little	2	Season 6 (VI): Mirage Poker Showdown	Season 7 (VII): Foxwoods World Poker Finals		
Freddy Deeb	2	Season 4 (IV): Aruba Poker Classic	Season 7 (VII): Celebrity Invitational		
Cornel Cimpan	2	Season 5 (V): Borgata Poker Open	Season 8 (VIII): Foxwoods World Poker Finals		
Hoyt Corkins	2	Season 2 (II): World Poker Finals	Season 8 (VIII): Southern Poker Championship		
Randal Flowers	2	Season 8 (VIII): Spanish Championship	Season 9 (IX): Festa al Lago		
Antonio Esfandiari	2	Season 2 (II): L.A. Poker Classic	Season 9 (IX): Five Diamond World Poker Classic		
Tommy Vedes	2	Season 8 (VIII): Festa al Lago	Season 10 (X): Seminole Hard Rock Poker Showdown		
Marvin Rettenmaier	2	Season 10 (X): WPT World Championship	Season 11 (XI): Merit Cyprus Classic		
Matt Giannetti	2	Season 10 (X): Malta	Season 11 (XI): Lucky Hearts Poker Open		
J.C. Tran	2	Season 5 (V): World Poker Challenge	Season 12 (XII): Rolling Thunder		
Mohsin Charania	2	Season 12 (XII): Grand Prix de Paris	Season 13 (XIII): Five Diamond World Poker Classic		
Aaron Mermelstein	2	Season 13 (XIII): Borgata Winter Poker Open	Season 14 (XIV): Maryland Live		
Kevin Eyster	2	Season 11 (XI): Seminole Hard Rock Poker Showdown	Season 14 (XIV): Five Diamond World Poker Classic		
Sam Panzica	2	Season 15 (XV): bestbet Bounty Scramble	Season 15 (XV): Bay 101 Shooting Star		
Art Papazyan	2	Season 16 (XVI): Legends of Poker	Season 16 (XVI): Maryland at Live! Casino		
Tony Ruberto	2	Season 10 (X): Jacksonville	Season 17 (XVII): Maryland at Live! Casino		
Erkut Yilmaz	2	Season 17 (XVII): Borgata Poker Open	Season 17 (XVII): Rolling Thunder		
James Carroll	2	Season 12 (XII): Bay 101 Shooting Star	Season 17 (XVII): Seminole Hard Rock Poker Showdown		
Tony Tran	2	Season 17 (XVII): bestbet Bounty Scramble	Season 18 (XVIII): Rolling Thunder		
Chad Eveslage	2	Season 19 (XIX): WPT Venetian	Season 20 (XX): Five Diamond World Poker Classic		
Jared Jaffee	2	Season 12 (XII): bestbet Jacksonville Fall Poker Scramble	Season 21 (XXI): WPT Choctaw		
James Mackey	2	Season 15 (XV):Choctaw	Season 22 (XXII): WPT Choctaw Championship		

- WPT Alpha 8. WPT Special Events, WPT500, and WPTDeepStacks titles are not included in table for WPT Main Tour titles;
- WPT World Championship titles count, but WPT Tournament of Champions titles don't count as they are not open events;
- Sorted by last title when entered into Multiple World Poker Tour champions list. (Updated July 2025)
