= World Poker Tour season 17 results =

Below are the results for season 17 (XVII) of the World Poker Tour (2018–19).

Beginning this season, all televised final tables will be delayed and played at the Esports Arena at the Luxor in Las Vegas, Nevada.

== Results ==
=== Gardens Poker Festival ===
- Casino: The Gardens Casino, Hawaiian Gardens, California
- Buy-in: $5,000
- 6-Day Event: July 21–26, 2018
- Number of Entries: 584
- Total Prize Pool: $2,944,800
- Number of Payouts: 73

Final Table
Place	Name	Prize
1st	(United States) Simon Lam	$565,055
2nd	(United States) Jake Schindler	$366,740
3rd	(United States) Men Nguyen	$270,430
4th	(United States) Craig Varnell	$201,615
5th	(United States) Saya Ono	$151,995
6th	(United States) Jared Griener	$115,885

=== WPT Choctaw ===
- Casino: Choctaw Casinos & Resorts, Durant, Oklahoma
- Buy-in: $3,700
- 5-Day Event: August 3–7, 2018
- Number of Entries: 755
- Total Prize Pool: $2,548,225
- Number of Payouts: 96

Final Table
Place	Name	Prize
1st	(United States) Brady Holiman	$469,185
2nd	(United States) Viet Vo	$302,725
3rd	(United States) Christopher Smith	$223,370
4th	(United States) Tony Ruberto	$166,605
5th	(United States) Anthony Zinno	$125,630
6th	(United States) Timothy Domboski	$95,780

=== Borgata Poker Open ===
- Casino: Borgata, Atlantic City, New Jersey
- Buy-in: $3,500
- 5-Day Event: September 16–21, 2018
- Number of Entries: 1,075
- Total Prize Pool: $3,441,075
- Number of Payouts: 136

Final Table
Place	Name	Prize
1st	(United States) Erkut Yilmaz	$575,112
2nd	(United States) T.K. Miles	$383,399
3rd	(United States) Oleg Shnaider	$283,341
4th	(United States) Austin Wentling	$211,562
5th	(United States) Liam He	$159,616
6th	(United States) Anthony Maio	$121,697

=== WPT Maryland at Live! Casino ===
- Casino: Live! Casino & Hotel, Hanover, Maryland
- Buy-in: $3,500
- 5-Day Event: September 21–25, 2018
- Number of Entries: 554
- Total Prize Pool: $1,757,800
- Number of Payouts: 70

Final Table
Place	Name	Prize
1st	(United States) Tony Ruberto	$344,755
2nd	(United States) Shankar Pillai	$220,780
3rd	(United States) Jeremy Ausmus	$162,597
4th	(United States) Will Givens	$121,112
5th	(United States) Aaron Pinson	$91,230
6th	(United States) Mark Sandness	$69,609

=== bestbet Bounty Scramble ===
- Casino: bestbet Jacksonville, Jacksonville, Florida
- Buy-in: $5,000
- 5-Day Event: October 19–23, 2018
- Number of Entries: 356
- Total Prize Pool: $1,648,280
- Number of Payouts: 45

Final Table
Place	Name	Prize
1st	(United States) Tony Tran	$341,486
2nd	(United States) Jake Schwartz	$228,590
3rd	(United States) Kelly Minkin	$146,973
4th	(United States) Ray Qartomy	$95,684
5th	(United States) Ping Liu	$73,734
6th	(United States) Dominique Mosley	$60,981

=== WPT Montreal ===
- Casino: Playground Poker Club, Kahnawake, Quebec
- Buy-in: $5,300
- 8-Day Event: October 28-November 4, 2018
- Number of Entries: 792
- Total Prize Pool: $5,000,000
- Number of Payouts: 103

Final Table
Place	Name	Prize
1st	(Canada) Patrick Serda	$855,000
2nd	(Canada) Ema Zajmović	$556,000
3rd	(Canada) Sorel Mizzi	$410,000
4th	(Canada) Kauvsegan Ehamparam	$305,450
5th	(United States) Upeshka De Silva	$230,250
6th	(Canada) Todd Callewaert	$175,500

=== Seminole Rock N' Roll Poker Open ===
- Casino: Seminole Hard Rock Hotel & Casino, Hollywood, Florida
- Buy-in: $3,500
- 6-Day Event: November 23–28, 2018
- Number of Entries: 898
- Total Prize Pool: $2,873,600
- Number of Payouts: 113

Final Table
Place	Name	Prize
1st	(Moldova) Pavel Plesuv	$504,820
2nd	(United States) James Gilbert	$326,565
3rd	(United States) Jeremy Joseph	$240,945
4th	(Austria) Marius Gierse	$179,710
5th	(United States) Christopher Kennedy	$135,505
6th	(United States) Ravi Raghavan	$103,310

=== Five Diamond World Poker Classic ===
- Casino: Bellagio, Las Vegas, Nevada
- Buy-in: $10,400
- 5-Day Event: December 11–15, 2018
- Number of Entries: 1,001
- Total Prize Pool: $9,709,700
- Number of Payouts: 126

Final Table
Place	Name	Prize
1st	(United States) Dylan Linde	$1,631,468
2nd	(Serbia) Milos Skrbic	$1,087,603
3rd	(United States) Andrew Lichtenberger	$802,973
4th	(United States) Ping Liu	$599,147
5th	(United States) Lisa Hamilton	$451,880
6th	(United States) Barry Hutter	$344,529

=== Gardens Poker Championship ===
- Casino: The Gardens Casino, Hawaiian Gardens, California
- Buy-in: $10,000
- 5-Day Event: January 12–16, 2019 (Final Table: March 12)
- Number of Entries: 253
- Total Prize Pool: $2,428,800
- Number of Payouts: 32

Final Table
Place	Name	Prize
1st	(United States) Frank Stepuchin	$548,825
2nd	(United States) Shannon Shorr	$355,885
3rd	(United States) Steve Sung	$259,880
4th	(United States) Brent Roberts	$192,465
5th	(United States) Ray Qartomy	$144,595
6th	(Belgium) Jonathan Abdellatif	$110,225

=== WPT Russia ===
- Casino: Casino Sochi, Sochi, Russia
- Buy-in: RUS 198,000
- 7-Day Event: January 21–27, 2019
- Number of Entries: 503
- Total Prize Pool: RUS 86,815,190
- Number of Payouts: 63

Final Table
Place	Name	Prize (RUS)
1st	(Ukraine) Denys Shafikov	16,800,000
2nd	(Russia) Aleksey Gortikov	11,270,000
3rd	(Belarus) Yauhen Kontush	7,288,190
4th	(Russia) Nikolay Fal	5,250,000
5th	(Russia) Mikhail Galitskiy	4,130,000
6th	(Russia) Oleg Pavlyuchuk	3,360,000

=== Borgata Winter Poker Open ===
- Casino: Borgata, Atlantic City, New Jersey
- Buy-in: $3,500
- 5-Day Event: January 27–31, 2019 (Final Table: March 13)
- Number of Entries: 1,415
- Total Prize Pool: $4,529,415
- Number of Payouts: 177

Final Table
Place	Name	Prize
1st	(United States) Vinicius Lima	$728,430
2nd	(United States) Dave Farah	$485,611
3rd	(Venezuela) Joseph Di Rosa Rojas	$359,555
4th	(United States) Brandon Hall	$268,810
5th	(United States) Daniel Buzgon	$202,942
6th	(United States) Ian O'Hara	$154,734

=== Fallsview Poker Classic ===
- Casino: Fallsview Casino, Niagara Falls, Ontario
- Buy-in: $5,000
- 3-Day Event: February 23–25, 2019
- Number of Entries: 602
- Total Prize Pool: $2,744,518
- Number of Payouts: 76

Final Table
Place	Name	Prize (CAD)
1st	(Canada) Demo Kiriopoulos	$517,424
2nd	(Canada) Wing Yeung	$362,853
3rd	(Canada) Andrew Pantling	$233,339
4th	(United States) Jake Schwartz	$167,388
5th	(Canada) James Morgan	$128,471
6th	(Canada) Noeung Troeung	$105,170

=== L.A. Poker Classic ===
- Casino: Commerce Casino, Commerce, California
- Buy-in: $10,000
- 5-Day Event: March 2–6, 2019 (Final Table: March 11)
- Number of Entries: 546
- Total Prize Pool: $5,169,270
- Number of Payouts: 69

Final Table
Place	Name	Prize
1st	(United States) David Baker	$1,015,000
2nd	(Lithuania) Matas Cimbolas	$646,930
3rd	(United States) Darren Elias	$473,280
4th	(United States) Jean-Claude Moussa	$346,550
5th	(United States) John Smith	$267,400
6th	(South Korea) Steve Yea	$201,650

=== WPT Rolling Thunder ===
- Casino: Thunder Valley Casino Resort, Lincoln, California
- Buy-in: $5,000
- 5-Day Event: March 8–12, 2019
- Number of Entries: 280
- Total Prize Pool: $1,302,000
- Number of Payouts: 35

Final Table
Place	Name	Prize
1st	(United States) Erkut Yilmaz	$303,920
2nd	(United States) Jim Collopy	$200,780
3rd	(United States) Ajay Chabra	$130,345
4th	(United States) Dylan Linde	$95,350
5th	(United States) Anthony Zinno	$68,860
6th	(United States) Jerry Robinson	$50,720

=== WPT Barcelona ===
- Casino: Casino Barcelona, Barcelona, Spain
- Buy-in: €3,300
- 7-Day Event: March 11–17, 2019
- Number of Entries: 1,227
- Total Prize Pool: €3,570,570
- Number of Payouts: 151

Final Table
Place	Name	Prize
1st	(Latvia) Vitalijs Zavorotnijs	€600,000
2nd	(Bulgaria) Boris Kolev	€375,000
3rd	(France) Eric Sfez	€281,570
4th	(Austria) Niko Koop	€215,000
5th	(Sweden) Jerry Odeen	€160,000
6th	(Lebanon) Alain Zeidan	€120,000

=== WPT at Venetian ===
- Casino: The Venetian, Las Vegas, Nevada
- Buy-in: $3,500
- 5-Day Event: March 22–26, 2019
- Number of Entries: 734
- Total Prize Pool: $2,333,800
- Number of Payouts: 92

Final Table
Place	Name	Prize
1st	(United States) Ben Palmer	$431,655
2nd	(United States) Tony Gargano	$277,760
3rd	(United States) Danny Qutami	$204,810
4th	(United States) Orlando Barrera	$152,690
5th	(United States) Mark Ioli	$115,105
6th	(United States) Will Givens	$87,760

=== Seminole Hard Rock Poker Showdown ===
- Casino: Seminole Hard Rock Hotel & Casino, Hollywood, Florida
- Buy-in: $3,500
- 5-Day Event: April 12–16, 2019 (Final Table: May 30)
- Number of Entries: 1,360
- Total Prize Pool: $4,352,000
- Number of Payouts: 170

Final Table
Place	Name	Prize
1st	(United States) James Carroll	$715,175
2nd	(Canada) Eric Afriat	$465,120
3rd	(United States) Maria Ho	$344,960
4th	(United States) Jerry Wong	$257,815
5th	(Canada) Ami Alibay	$194,610
6th	(United States) Chad Eveslage	$148,380

=== WPT Choctaw ===
- Casino: Choctaw Casino Resort, Durant, Oklahoma
- Buy-in: $3,700
- 4-Day Event: May 17–20, 2019 (Final Table: May 31)
- Number of Entries: 577
- Total Prize Pool: $1,958,915
- Number of Payouts: 74

Final Table
Place	Name	Prize
1st	(United States) Craig Varnell	$379,990
2nd	(United States) Will Berry	$243,330
3rd	(United States) Nick Pupillo	$179,430
4th	(United States) Trung Pham	$133,770
5th	(United States) Stacey Jones	$100,850
6th	(United States) Austin Lewis	$76,890

=== Aria Summer Championship ===
- Casino: Aria Resort & Casino, Las Vegas, Nevada
- Buy-in: $10,000
- 4-Day Event: May 27–31, 2019
- Number of Entries: 192
- Total Prize Pool: $1,824,000
- Number of Payouts: 24

Final Table
Place	Name	Prize
1st	(United States) Matthew Wantman	$443,475
2nd	(Russia) Igor Kurganov	$285,650
3rd	(United States) Art Papazyan	$209,980
4th	(United States) Kevin Eyster	$156,220
5th	(United States) Jim Collopy	$117,640
6th	(United States) Ryan Laplante	$89,685

=== WPT Tournament of Champions ===
- Casino: Aria Resort & Casino, Las Vegas, Nevada
- Buy-in: $15,000
- 3-Day Event: June 1–3, 2019
- Number of Entries: 76
- Total Prize Pool: $1,290,000
- Number of Payouts: 10

Final Table
Place	Name	Prize
1st	(Germany) Ole Schemion	$440,395
2nd	(United States) Tony Dunst	$250,265
3rd	(United States) Ryan Tosoc	$166,845
4th	(United States) Simon Lam	$115,945
5th	(United States) Griffin Paul	$84,140
6th	(United States) Nick Schulman	$63,890

== Player of the Year ==
Erkut Yilmaz won Player of the Year.

Standings
Rank	Name	Points
1	Erkut Yilmaz	2,300
2	Dylan Linde	2,150
3	James Carroll	2,100
4	Ping Liu	2,000
5	Tony Ruberto	1,850
