= World Poker Tour season 24 results =

2026 schedule and results for poker series

Below are the results for season 24 (XXIV) of the World Poker Tour, the WPT Main Tour events for 2026.

== Results ==
=== (United States) WPT Lucky Hearts Poker Open Championship ===
- Casino: Seminole Hard Rock Hotel & Casino, Hollywood, Florida
- Buy-in: $3,500
- 6-Day Event: January 16-20, 2026
- Number of Entries: 1,229
- Total Prize Pool: $3,932,800
- Number of Payouts: 154

Final Table
Place	Name	Prize
1st	(Venezuela) Giuseppe Iadisernia	$611,700
2nd	(United States) Jorge Gomez	$395,000
3rd	(Belgium) Thomas Boivin	$295,000
4th	(England) Martins Adeniya	$220,000
5th	(Russia) Anatoly Nikitin	$167,000
6th	(United States) Nicholas Blumenthal	$127,000

*First-place amount includes the winner's $10,400 entry into the season-ending WPT World Championship at Wynn Las Vegas.

=== WPT Cambodia Championship ===
- Casino: NagaWorld Integrated Resort, Phnom Penh, Cambodia
- Buy-in: $3,500
- 6-Day Event: February 3-8, 2026
- Number of Entries: 425
- Total Prize Pool: $1,455,400
- Number of Payouts: 54

Final Table
Place	Name	Prize
1st	(China) Xiaosheng Zheng	$244,500
2nd	(Republic of Ireland) Micheal O'Neill	$249,700
3rd	(India) Kunal Patni	$145,000
4th	(China) Chengcai Pan	$110,000
5th	(France) Julien Sitbon	$83,000
6th	(Malaysia) Yong Kok	$63,000

*First-place amount includes the winner's $10,400 entry into the season-ending WPT World Championship at Wynn Las Vegas.

=== (United States) WPT Venetian Las Vegas Championship ===
- Casino: The Venetian Las Vegas, Las Vegas, Nevada
- Buy-in: $5,000
- 7-Day Event: February 19-24, 2026
- Number of Entries: 488
- Total Prize Pool: $2,244,800
- Number of Payouts: 61

Final Table
Place	Name	Prize
1st	(United States) Nicholas Seward	$706,960
2nd	(United States) Gregory Brown	$623,540
3rd	(United States) Drake Kemper	$395,000
4th	(United States) Lily Kiletto	$295,000
5th	(United States) Anthony Zinno	$220,000
6th	(South Korea) Edward Pak	$169,000

*First-place amount includes the winner's $10,400 entry into the season-ending WPT World Championship at Wynn Las Vegas.

=== (United States) WPT Rolling Thunder ===
- Casino: Thunder Valley Casino Resort, Lincoln, California
- Buy-in: $3,500
- 4-Day Event: March 29-April 1, 2026
- Number of Entries: 310
- Total Prize Pool: $992,000
- Number of Payouts: 39

Final Table
Place	Name	Prize
1st	(United States) Alexander Farahi	$193,725
2nd	(Canada) Matthew Salsberg	$151,275
3rd	(United States) Arish Nat	$100,000
4th	(United States) Marco Johnson	$74,000
5th	(United States) Darrell Cain	$56,000
6th	(United States) Alec Gould	$43,000

*First-place amount includes the winner's $10,400 entry into the season-ending WPT World Championship at Wynn Las Vegas.

=== (United States) Seminole Hard Rock Poker Showdown ===
- Casino: Seminole Hard Rock Hotel & Casino, Hollywood, Florida
- Buy-in: $3,500
- 6-Day Event: April 8-28, 2026
- Number of Entries: 1,417
- Total Prize Pool: $4,534,000
- Number of Payouts: 178

Final Table
Place	Name	Prize
1st	(United States) Ian Cohen	$656,200
2nd	(United States) Richard Seymour	$430,000
3rd	(United States) Michael Amato	$320,000
4th	(United States) Frank Funaro	$240,000
5th	(United States) Johnny Bromberg	$181,000
6th	(United States) Rajesh Vohra	$138,000

*First-place amount includes the winner's $10,400 entry into the season-ending WPT World Championship at Wynn Las Vegas.

=== WPT Australia ===
- Casino: The Star Gold Coast, Gold Coast, Australia
- Buy-in: tbc
- 5-Day Event: September 10-30, 2026
- Number of Entries:
- Total Prize Pool:
- Number of Payouts:

Final Table
Place	Name	Prize A$-(U$D)
1st		
2nd		
3rd		
4th		
5th		
6th		

*First-place amount includes the winner's $10,400 entry into the season-ending WPT World Championship at Wynn Las Vegas.

MORE VENUES TO BE ADD IN 2026

=== (United States) WPT World Championship at Wynn Las Vegas ===
- Casino: Wynn Las Vegas, Las Vegas, Nevada
- Buy-in: $10,400
- 5-Day Event: End of 2026 Season (December ou January 2027)
- Number of Entries:
- Total Prize Pool:
- Number of Payouts:

Final Table
Place	Name	Prize
1st		
2nd		
3rd		
4th		
5th		
6th		
