= United Auburn Indian Community =

Native American tribe

The United Auburn Indian Community (UAIC) is a federally recognized Native America tribe consisting mostly of Miwok Indians indigenous to the Sacramento Valley region.

Location of the Auburn Rancheria

The historic Auburn Rancheria is located in the Sierra Nevada foothills near Auburn, in Placer County, California.

== The tribe ==
Total tribal membership of UAIC is approximately 170, with 52 members residing on the Auburn Rancheria (39°01′22″N 121°19′28″W), located in western Placer County near the community of Sheridan. The Tribe is governed by its tribal council, which consists of the chairperson, vice-chairperson, treasurer, secretary and council member at large. (2)

== History ==
The UAIC is the successor to the Auburn Band, largely Miwok Indians. These indigenous communities of California Indians resided near Auburn, California and survived the depredations of the 19th century.

This territory offered UAIC ancestors abundant year-round food sources. Food gathering was based on seasonal ripening, but hunting, gathering and fishing went on all year, with the greatest activity in late summer and early fall.

Seasonal harvests were only for those with personal property and much activity and social behavior centered on them. Status, sharing, trading, ceremonies and disagreements were important adjuncts to the gathering and distribution of food. Grasses, herbs, and rushes provided food and material for clothing and baskets. Seeds were gathered by the use of a seed beater and tray. They were then parched, steamed, dried, cooked into a mush or dried for storage.

Bear hunts were ceremonial. Black bears were usually hunted in winter, where lighted poles were used to drive them from their dens. Grizzlies that lived on the valley floor were greatly feared and rarely hunted.

The historic existence of the Auburn Indian Community is documented in the Bureau of Indian Affairs' correspondence dating back to the early 1900s. In 1917, the United States government purchased 20 acres (81,000 m^{2}) of land near Auburn, California, that was put in trust for the Auburn Band and formally established a reservation, known as the Auburn Rancheria.

However, with the passage of the Indian Reorganization Act (“IRA”), 25 U.S.C. § 671 et seq., in 1934, a dramatic shift in Federal Indian policy occurred, whereby Congress moved away from assimilationist Indian policies towards policies of self-governance. The governmental structure allowed by the IRA placed the Bureau of Indian Affairs (BIA) in charge of elections among Indian tribes to allow each tribe to accept or reject the tribal reorganization provisions of the IRA. In 1935, the 36 adult members of the Auburn Band voted 16 to 5 to reject the IRA.

The United States Congress enacted the Rancheria Termination Act in 1953, which terminated federal trust responsibilities to the Auburn Band, among many other California Indian tribes. Only a 2.8-acre (11,000 m^{2}) parcel of land with a park and a church remained after the government sold the Auburn Rancheria land. In 1967, the United States terminated their recognition of the Auburn Band.

President Richard Nixon ended termination policy in 1970. In 1978, during the 100th United States Congress, both the United States Senate and House of Representatives created a new federal Indian policy based on Native American self-determination.

On July 20, 1991, descendants of the historic Auburn Band reorganized their tribal government and adopted the Constitution of the United Auburn Indian Community (UAIC), which they presented to the BIA on August 30, 1991 with a request that the Bureau “formally recognize the United Auburn Indian Community of the Auburn Rancheria.” An Act of Congress passed the Auburn Indian Restoration Act, which restored the Tribe's federal recognition in 1994. A provision in the act permits the tribe to purchase lands in Placer County to create a new reservation.

In September 2002, the U.S. Department of the Interior took into trust the 49-acre (200,000 m^{2}) parcel of property that the Thunder Valley Casino is built on today.

== Programs ==
The UAIC Community Giving Program, a philanthropic branch of tribal government established by the Tribe in March 2004, has provided over $4.6 million USD to nonprofit organizations supporting needs in education, health, arts and humanities, environment, community development and social services.

UAIC has also established its own Education Department as a means to provide tribal members with educational programs, activities and services and maintains an Environmental Protection Office to address tribal environmental issues. UAIC established its own tribal school in 2008.

== Thunder Valley Casino Resort ==
The Tribe owns the Thunder Valley Casino Resort outside Lincoln, California, located near the northwest corner of Athens and Industrial Avenues, in the Sunset Industrial Area of unincorporated Placer County. The 200,000-square-foot (19,000 m^{2}) facility, which opened in June 2003, offers a variety of entertainment including slot machines, video gaming, and various table games. Guests can also dine in an array of restaurants and bars.

UAIC entered into a Tribal-State Gaming Compact with the State of California in September 1999 in order to conduct Class III gaming on trust land. This Compact was later successfully renegotiated with Governor Arnold Schwarzenegger in 2004.

In an unprecedented approach, the UAIC worked closely with Placer County, neighboring cities, and citizens that resulted in a Memorandum of Understanding to mitigate any potential impacts of the proposed development.

In 2010, Thunder Valley Casino Resort was named Best Regional Casino in Sacramento Magazine's "Best Of" issue, beating out competitor casinos Red Hawk Casino and Jackson Rancheria Casino and Hotel.
