= Hawaiian Gardens, California =

City in California, United States

- City
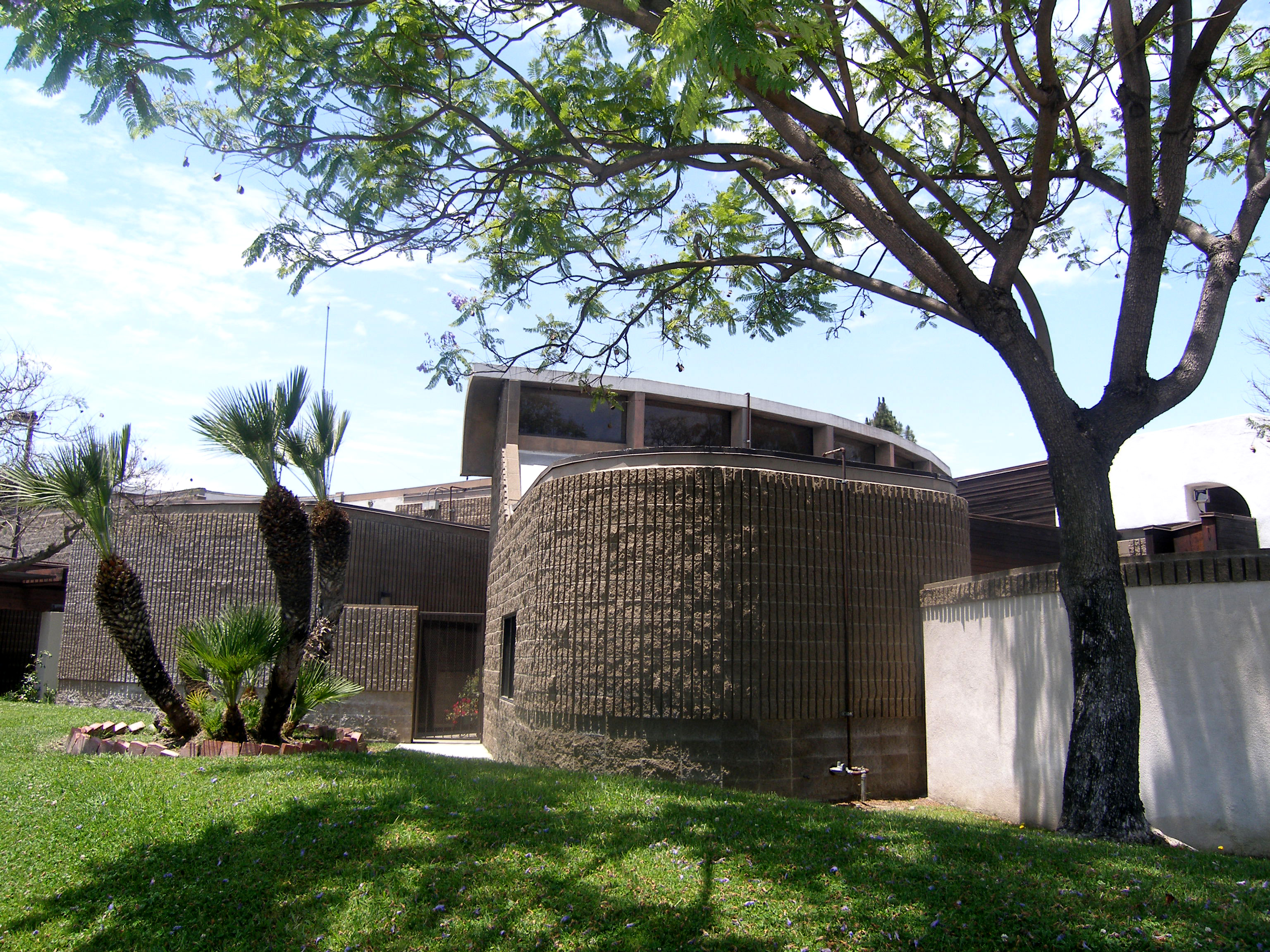
- Hawaiian Gardens Civic Center

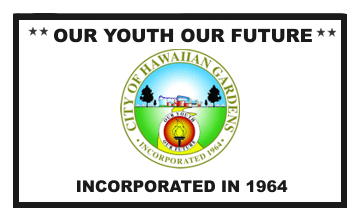
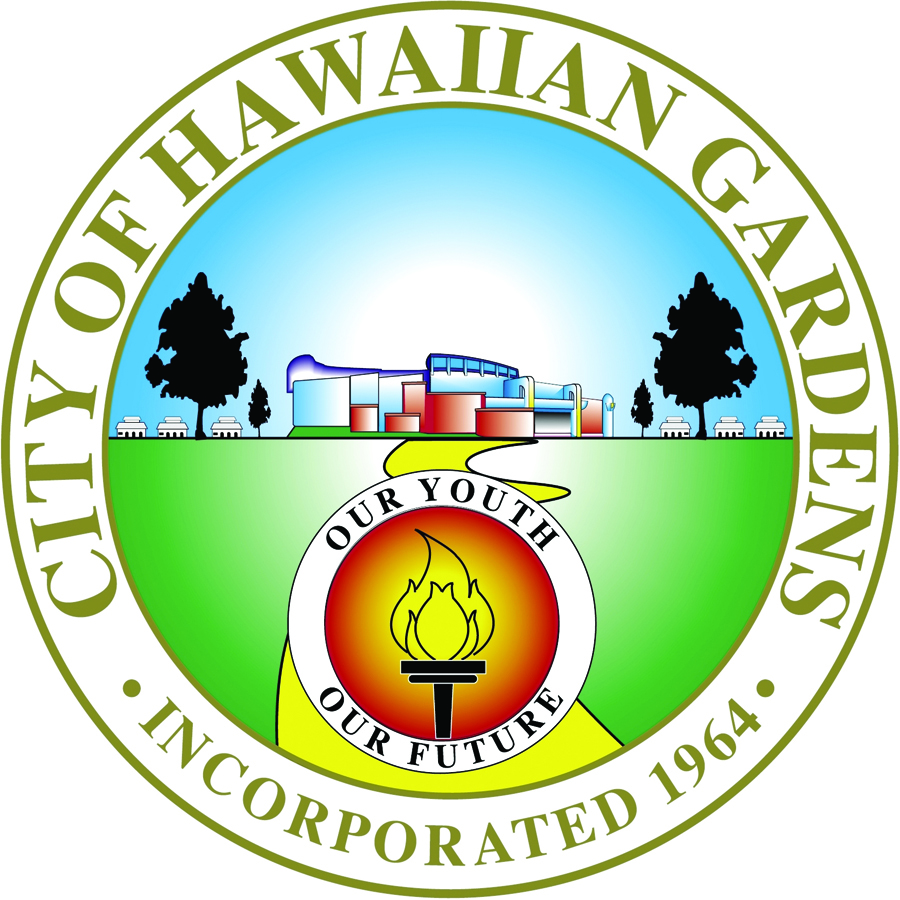
- Flag Seal
- Motto(s): "Our Youth, Our Future"
- Interactive map of Hawaiian Gardens, California
- Location in the United States
- Coordinates: 33°49′49″N 118°04′22″W
- Country: United States
- State: California
- County: Los Angeles
- Incorporated (city): April 9, 1964

Government
  - Type: City Council-City Manager
  - Mayor: Maria Del Rio
  - Mayor Pro Tem: Luis Roa
  - Council Members: Victor Farfan; Ernie Vargas; Dandy De Paula
  - City Manager: Ernesto Marquez

Area
  - Total: 0.96 sq mi (2.48 km^{2})
  - Land: 0.95 sq mi (2.45 km^{2})
  - Water: 0.012 sq mi (0.03 km^{2}) 1.22%
- Elevation: 33 ft (10 m)

Population (2020)
  - Total: 14,149
  - Estimate (2024): 13,457
  - Density: 15,000/sq mi (5,780/km^{2})
- Time zone: UTC−8 (PST)
  - Summer (DST): UTC−7 (PDT)
- ZIP code: 90716
- Area code: 562
- FIPS code: 06-32506
- GNIS feature ID: 2410716
- Website: hgcity.org

Hawaiian Gardens is a city in Los Angeles County, California, United States. It is the smallest city in the county in area (approximately 1.0 mi^{2}) and was incorporated on April 9, 1964. The population was 14,149 at the 2020 census, down slightly from 14,254 at the 2010 census.

The city's unusual name originated with a 1920s refreshment stand that was decorated with palm fronds and bamboo. It was the then-rural area's main landmark for many years, and its name stuck as the small town grew up around it. As one of seven Los Angeles County cities that allow casino gambling, more than $9.2 million (65%) of the city's revenue comes from the Gardens Casino.

== Geography ==
Hawaiian Gardens is bounded by the Los Angeles County cities of Long Beach and Lakewood and by the Orange County city of Cypress.

According to the United States Census Bureau, the city has a total area of 0.96 square miles (2.5 km^{2}), of which 0.94 square miles (2.4 km^{2}) is land and 0.01 square miles (0.026 km^{2}) (1.22%) is water. Hawaiian Gardens is the smallest city by area in Los Angeles County.

== History ==
After a nineteenth-century property bubble crashed, Los Angeles began growing again, and by the turn of the century had reached 100,000 inhabitants. But the area that would become Hawaiian Gardens (then known as "The Delta") remained largely a rural area with dairy and truck farms and some oil development. In 1927, a fruit stand with palms was opened on the corner of two dirt roads of Carson Street and Norwalk Boulevard called Hawaiian Gardens. Thus, the name was born. During the Great Depression, the area became a refuge for people to buy or build a home due to low land costs, despite poor roads, frequent flooding, and limited access to electricity.

In the late 1920s, only Norwalk Blvd was a paved road. For the next 35 years, except for Pioneer Boulevard, Norwalk Boulevard, and Carson Street, the little town would be all dirt roads. Major flooding occurred in 1952. When the city was incorporated in 1964, the paving of roads began immediately. By 1966, all streets south of Carson between Pioneer and Norwalk were paved. By 1968, all streets were paved, and the three major thoroughfares of Norwalk, Pioneer, and Carson were widened to current traffic standards.

== Historic structures lost ==
- Van Kampen Dairy Drive-In (1959–2011); razed for parking lot in 2013; SW Corner of Norwalk and 226th Streets
- Bloomfield Elementary School (1924–1986); sold for $3 million in lieu of current shopping center; 12100 Carson St
- Homebase Warehouse Store (1989–2007); sold and razed for the current bingo club at 21900 Norwalk Blvd.
- Historic Section at 22100–21700 Norwalk Boulevard; razed in 1989 for Homebase Warehouse Store. This whole east side of Norwalk Boulevard had a few cafes, businesses, and beauty salons, some of which dated back to the 1950s.
- Plowboys Market (1956–1999); family-owned supermarket replaced by the Gardens Casino; there were also other businesses replaced, including a Pic 'N' Save
- The original Hawaiian Gardens City Hall (1964–1979); building razed 1988 for Gardens Shopping Center; 12134 Tilbury St.
- The original Hawaiian Gardens Library (1979–1988); building razed 1988 for Gardens Shopping Center; 12134 Tilbury St.

== Demographics ==
Historical population
Census	Pop.	Note	%±
1930	88		—
1940	432		390.9%
1950	1,200		177.8%
1960	2,100		75.0%
1970	9,052		331.0%
1980	10,548		16.5%
1990	13,639		29.3%
2000	14,779		8.4%
2010	14,254		−3.6%
2020	14,149		−0.7%
2024 (est.)	13,457	▼	−4.9%
U.S. Decennial Census; 1860–1870 1880-1890; 1900 1910 1920; 1930 1940 1950; 1960 1970 1980; 1990 2000 2010; 2020

Hawaiian Gardens was first listed as a city in the 1970 U.S. census.

=== Racial and ethnic composition ===
Hawaiian Gardens city, California – Racial and ethnic composition Note: the US Census treats Hispanic/Latino as an ethnic category. This table excludes Latinos from the racial categories and assigns them to a separate category. Hispanics/Latinos may be of any race.
Race / Ethnicity (NH = Non-Hispanic)	Pop 1980	Pop 1990	Pop 2000	Pop 2010	Pop 2020	% 1980	% 1990	% 2000	% 2010	% 2020
White alone (NH)	4,036	2,695	1,595	1,044	773	38.26%	19,76%	10.79%	7.32%	5.46%
Black or African American alone (NH)	139	579	621	482	550	1.32%	4.25%	4.20%	3.38%	3.89%
Native American or Alaska Native alone (NH)	151	62	69	46	18	1.43%	0.45%	0.47%	0.32%	0.13%
Asian alone (NH)	669	1,214	1,282	1,491	1,732	6.32%	8.90%	8.67%	10.46%	12.24%
Native Hawaiian or Pacific Islander alone (NH)	669	1,214	91	49	35	6.32%	8.90%	0.62%	0.34%	0.25%
Other race alone (NH)	13	11	16	14	56	0.12%	0.08%	0.11%	0.10%	0.40%
Mixed race or Multiracial (NH)	x	x	236	118	127	x	x	1.60%	0.83%	0.90%
Hispanic or Latino (any race)	5,540	9,078	10,869	11,010	10,858	52.52%	66.56%	73.54%	77.24%	76.74%
Total	10,548	13,639	14,779	14,254	14,149	100.00%	100.00%	100.00%	100.00%	100.00%

=== 2020 census ===
As of the 2020 census, Hawaiian Gardens had a population of 14,149. The median age was 33.3 years. 25.2% of residents were under the age of 18 and 11.5% of residents were 65 years of age or older. For every 100 females, there were 98.6 males, and for every 100 females age 18 and over, there were 94.9 males.

100.0% of residents lived in urban areas, while 0.0% lived in rural areas.

There were 3,735 households in Hawaiian Gardens, of which 46.6% had children under the age of 18 living in them. Of all households, 47.8% were married-couple households, 15.4% were households with a male householder and no spouse or partner present, and 29.3% were households with a female householder and no spouse or partner present. About 14.5% of all households were made up of individuals, and 7.5% had someone living alone who was 65 years of age or older.

There were 3,807 housing units, of which 1.9% were vacant. The homeowner vacancy rate was 0.0% and the rental vacancy rate was 1.5%.

=== 2023 ACS 5-year estimates ===
In 2023, the US Census Bureau estimated that 37.9% of the population were foreign-born. Of all people aged 5 or older, 26.2% spoke only English at home, 60.7% spoke Spanish, 2.7% spoke other Indo-European languages, 10.3% spoke Asian or Pacific Islander languages, and 0.2% spoke other languages. Of those aged 25 or older, 68.0% were high school graduates and 16.8% had a bachelor's degree.

The median household income in 2023 was $76,025, and the per capita income was $25,032. About 14.7% of families and 17.9% of the population were below the poverty line.

=== 2010 census ===
At the 2010 census Hawaiian Gardens had a population of 14,254. The population density was 14,905.0 inhabitants per square mile (5,754.9/km^{2}). The racial makeup of Hawaiian Gardens was 6,477 (45.4%) White (7.3% Non-Hispanic White), 546 (3.8%) African American, 178 (1.2%) Native American, 1,513 (10.6%) Asian, 57 (0.4%) Pacific Islander, 4,929 (34.6%) from other races, and 554 (3.9%) from two or more races. Hispanic or Latino of any race were 11,010 persons (77.2%).

The census reported that 14,238 people (99.9% of the population) lived in households, 16 (0.1%) lived in non-institutionalized group quarters, and no one was institutionalized.

There were 3,562 households, 1,930 (54.2%) had children under the age of 18 living in them, 1,819 (51.1%) were married couples living together, 714 (20.0%) had a female householder with no husband present, 337 (9.5%) had a male householder with no wife present. There were 217 (6.1%) partnerships, and 20 (0.6%) same-sex married couples or partnerships. 534 households (15.0%) were one person and 246 (6.9%) had someone living alone who was 65 or older. The average household size was 4.00. There were 2,870 families (80.6% of households); the average family size was 4.33.

The age distribution was 4,576 people (32.1%) under the age of 18, 1,759 people (12.3%) aged 18 to 24, 4,109 people (28.8%) aged 25 to 44, 2,684 people (18.8%) aged 45 to 64, and 1,126 people (7.9%) who were 65 or older. The median age was 28.4 years. For every 100 females, there were 99.4 males. For every 100 females age 18 and over, there were 96.9 males.

There were 3,703 housing units at an average density of 3,872.1 per square mile, of the occupied units 1,577 (44.3%) were owner-occupied and 1,985 (55.7%) were rented. The homeowner vacancy rate was 1.7%; the rental vacancy rate was 4.3%. 6,247 people (43.8% of the population) lived in owner-occupied housing units and 7,991 people (56.1%) lived in rental housing units.

According to the 2010 United States Census, Hawaiian Gardens had a median household income of $42,017, with 24.4% of the population living below the federal poverty line.

== Government and infrastructure ==
=== City government ===
The City of Hawaiian Gardens is a general law city and governs itself as a council-manager form of government. The city council is elected at-large. The city council appoints the city manager. The council establishes policies and ordinances and the city manager, assisted by the department heads, implements them. It is a contract city, meaning its main municipal services (fire, police, library) are contracted to other regional agencies. Prior to the passage of Proposition 13 in 1978, this, along with the city's gambling revenue, allowed it to keep property taxes very low. Incorporation in 1964 was primarily intended to prevent annexation to Long Beach, a full-service city with higher property taxes. As a small municipal enclave centered around gambling near many transit arteries, it has been called the "Money Laundering Capital" of Southern California.

The city council members must be Hawaiian Gardens residents and registered voters. As specified by the Constitution of California, city elections are non-partisan. One council member is also selected as a member of the Gateway Cities Council of Governments.

=== State and federal representation ===
In the California State Legislature, Hawaiian Gardens is in the 36th senatorial district, represented by Republican Tony Strickland, and in the 67th Assembly district, represented by Democrat Sharon Quirk-Silva.

In the United States House of Representatives, Hawaiian Gardens is in California's 45th congressional district, represented by Democrat Derek Tran.

=== Public services ===
Fire protection in Hawaiian Gardens is provided by the Los Angeles County Fire Department with ambulance transport by Care Ambulance Service.

The Los Angeles County Sheriff's Department operates the Lakewood Station in Lakewood, serving Hawaiian Gardens.

The Los Angeles County Department of Health Services operates the Whittier Health Center in Whittier, serving Hawaiian Gardens.

Hawaiian Gardens is served by the United States Postal Service Los Alamitos Post Office, located at 10650 Reagan St, Los Alamitos, CA 90720. Los Cerritos Community News serves the city.

Library Services are provided by the Los Angeles County Public Library, which operates a local branch at 11940 Carson St.

== Education ==
Hawaiian Gardens is served by the ABC Unified School District.

Schools within Hawaiian Gardens include Venn W. Furgeson Elementary School, Hawaiian Elementary School, and Fedde Middle School (formerly called Killingsworth Junior High School).

High school students are zoned to Artesia High School in Lakewood.

The city is represented by the Cerritos Community College district and pays bonds to build facilities in that district, but geographically is closer to the Liberal Arts campus of Long Beach City College.

== Economy ==
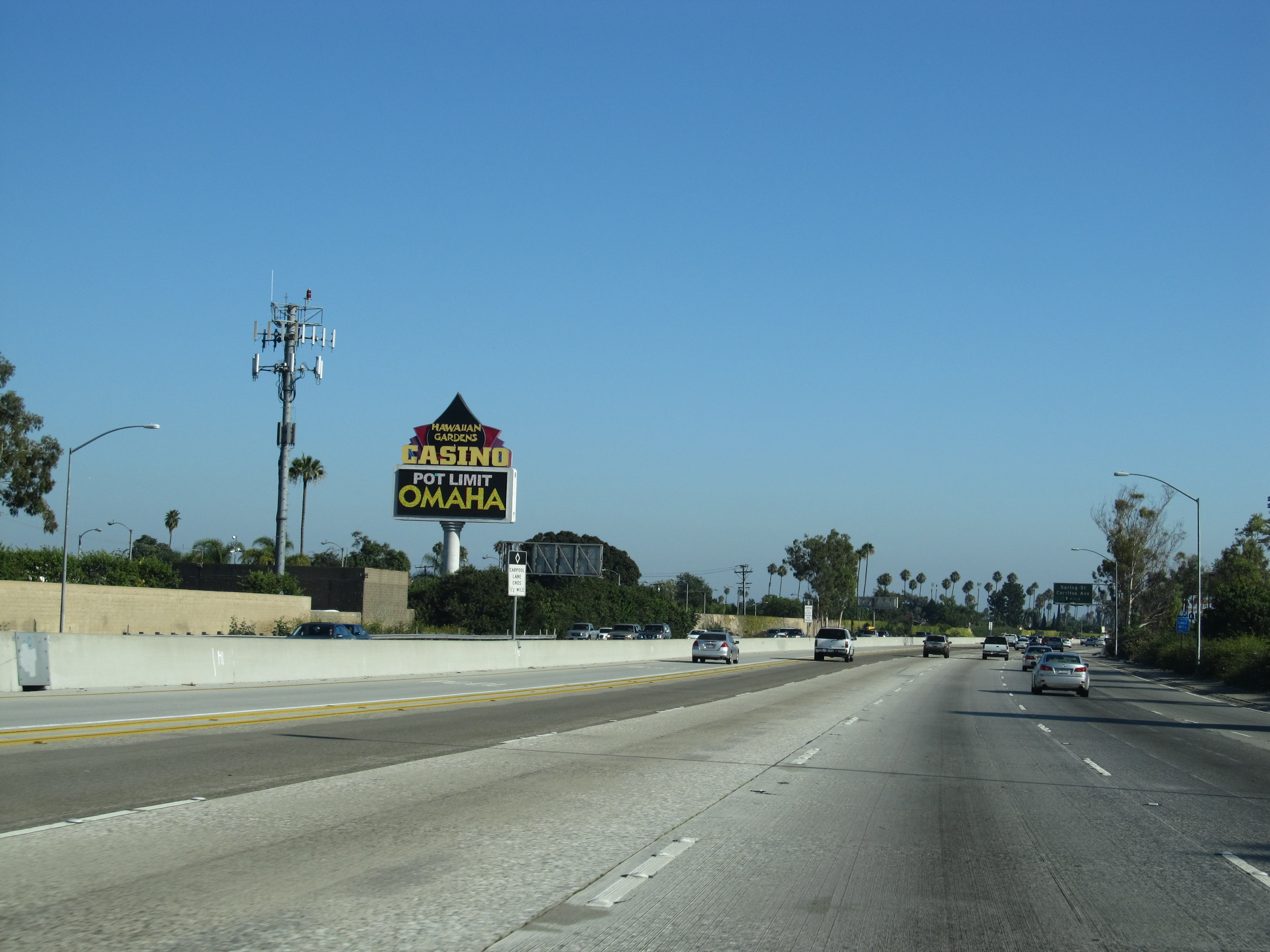
Interstate 605 (viewed from the southbound lanes) at Hawaiian Gardens, California approaching Hawaiian Gardens Casino

=== Top employers ===
According to the city's 2022 Annual Comprehensive Financial Report, the top employers in the city are:

#	Employer	# of Employees
1	Hawaiian Gardens Casino	913
2	ABC Unified School District	96
3	City of Hawaiian Gardens	85
4	Food 4 Less	67
5	McDonald's	56
6	Pacific Gardens Medical Center	53
7	Jack in the Box	28
8 (tie)	99 Cents Only Stores	27
8 (tie)	Howard Contracting Inc.	27
10	CVS Pharmacy	17

== See also ==
- Gateway Cities
