= Commerce Casino =

Card room in Commerce, California, United States

Coordinates: 33.998407°N 118.144587°W

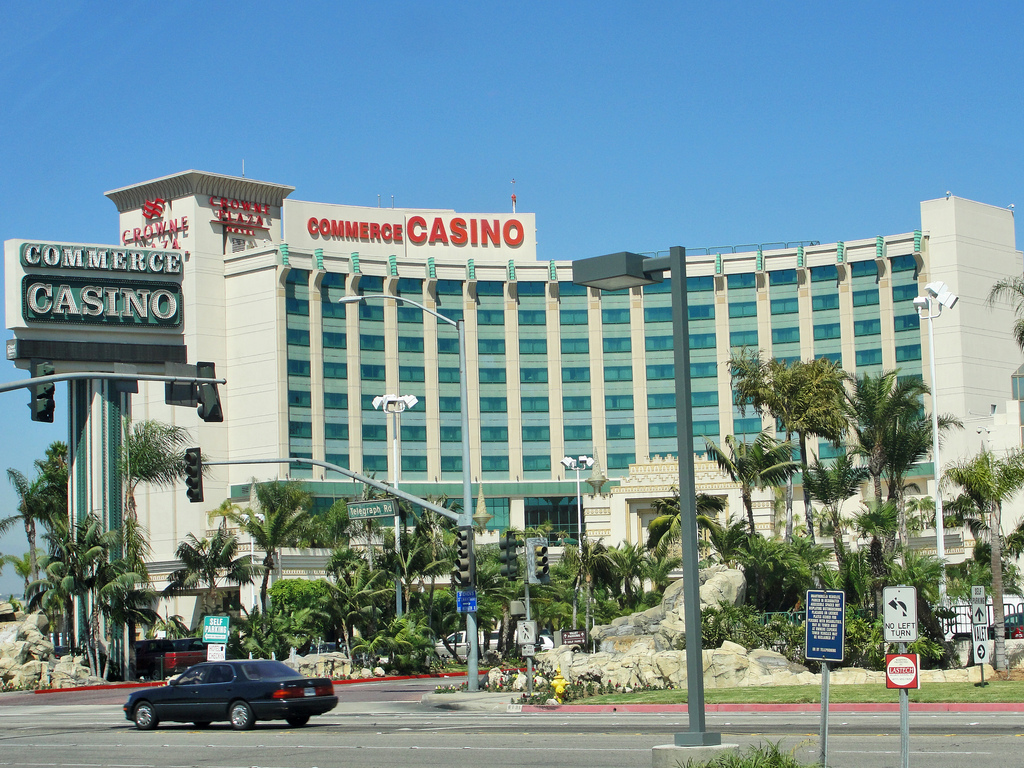
- Interactive map of Commerce Casino
- Location: Commerce, California 90040; 6131 East Telegraph Road
- Opened: August 1983
- Theme: Assyrian/Babylonian
- No. of rooms: 200
- Gaming space: 91,694 square feet (8,518.7 m^{2})
- Casino type: Land
- Renovated in: 2001 (hotel addition)
- Website: www.commercecasino.com

Commerce Casino, officially the Commerce Casino & Hotel is a cardroom located in the Los Angeles suburb of Commerce. With over 240 tables on site, Commerce Casino is the largest cardroom in the world. Established in 1983, the casino accounted for 38% of Commerce's tax revenues for the 2006-2007 fiscal year. As of 2016, the casino was providing $22 million a year in licensing fees to the city.

In addition to the main cardroom, the Commerce Casino complex includes a full-service 200-room Crowne Plaza Hotel, which houses dining establishments, a day spa, a beauty salon, pool and sundeck, banquet rooms, shops, and entertainment. The Commerce is also home to several restaurants and host to live boxing, mixed martial arts and professional wrestling events. Commerce Casino opened a Playboy-themed gaming lounge in 2014.

== Notable Events ==
The venue has hosted many professional wrestling events in its history. In 2021, the casino hosted the United Wrestling Network's Red Carpet Rumble pay-per-view event.

== Poker ==
The Commerce Casino offers a wide variety of limit, pot limit and no limit poker games, including:

- Seven-card stud
- Texas hold 'em
- Omaha Hi-Lo Split
- HORSE

The casino spreads more Texas Hold'em games than any other casino in the world. Commerce spreads hold'em games as low as 2-3 and 2-4. 3-6, 4-8 & 6-12 exist on the main floor, with 8-16 and larger limit games in the Hotel section. No Limit Hold 'em games have buy-ins as low as $40 and go much higher. There is a new $5/10 $500/$1500 spread No Limit Hold'em game which was first created in 2008.

The Casino's bad beat jackpots sometimes grow into six figures. Commerce Casino offers a $100,000 Super Jackpot for Hold 'em.

Players can bring members of a home game to the Casino and they will provide game instruction, dealers, a pit boss, cards, chips and poker snacks. The "home" games act as live cash games and are eligible for jackpots.

=== Tournaments ===
The Commerce Casino is home to several poker tournament series, including:

- Los Angeles Poker Classic - Annual tournament beginning in January and running through early March. This is Commerce's major tournament of the year, involving a World Poker Tour event, a Professional Poker Tour event and the celebrity event, the World Poker Tour Invitational.
- California State Poker Championship - Annual tournament, held in May. Originally held in June, the tournament was moved to avoid conflict with the World Series of Poker.
- Commerce Hold 'em Series - Annual tournament held in September with smaller buy-ins where every event is Texas hold 'em.
- The L.A. Poker Open - Annual tournament held in November.

=== Restaurants ===
The Commerce Casino is home to several eating establishments, including:

- The Commerce Cafe - Near the Main Poker Room offering Traditional American cuisine, pastries and Starbucks hot and iced coffees.
- Tableside Dining

== California games ==
Commerce also offers Pan, No Bust Blackjack, 3 Card Poker, Let It Ride, Caribbean Stud Poker, 21st Century Baccarat, EZ Baccarat, Pai Gow Poker, Super Pan Nine and 13 Card (Chinese poker).

Games besides poker, such as the ones listed above, are called "California Games" and have been modified to conform to California state gambling laws. The primary difference between California Games and normal casino table games is that the player does not play against the house but rather plays against a third-party provider that banks the games. California law requires that all non-poker games at the Commerce Casino or any California card room are player-banked, meaning players play only against one another, and never against the house. Any player that regularly banks the "player banked games" and does not have a contract with the casino to do so will be barred from the casino. The Commerce serves as a host for these games, providing a venue for their play and benefits indirectly off the gambling revenue through "rent" payments from the third-party provider. The casino also charges a collection to play the game usually 1% of the bet wagered (rounded up to the nearest dollar) for hosting these games.

== Off-Track betting ==
The Racebook at Commerce Casino opened in July 2009, featuring mini satellite wagering from California and Eastern U.S. race tracks.

== Popular culture ==
- In "So Close, Yet So Far", the second episode of the AMC television series, Fear the Walking Dead, an aerial nighttime shot of Los Angeles in the early stages of the zombie apocalypse shows the casino and hotel tower engulfed in flames next to a gridlocked Santa Ana Freeway.
- A comedy sketch promoting the casino was featured in First Night 2013 with Jamie Kennedy, a New Year's Eve television special hosted by comedian and television producer Jamie Kennedy.
- In Twin Peaks the return, the casino was featured as the Silver Mustang.
- In "A Bird in the Hand", season 12, episode 01 of "Columbo", exterior and interiors used in scenes
- The movie "Molly's Game" (based on a true story) references The Commerce Casino.
