= Gardens Casino =

Cardroom casino in California

Coordinates: 33.832334°N 118.078737°W

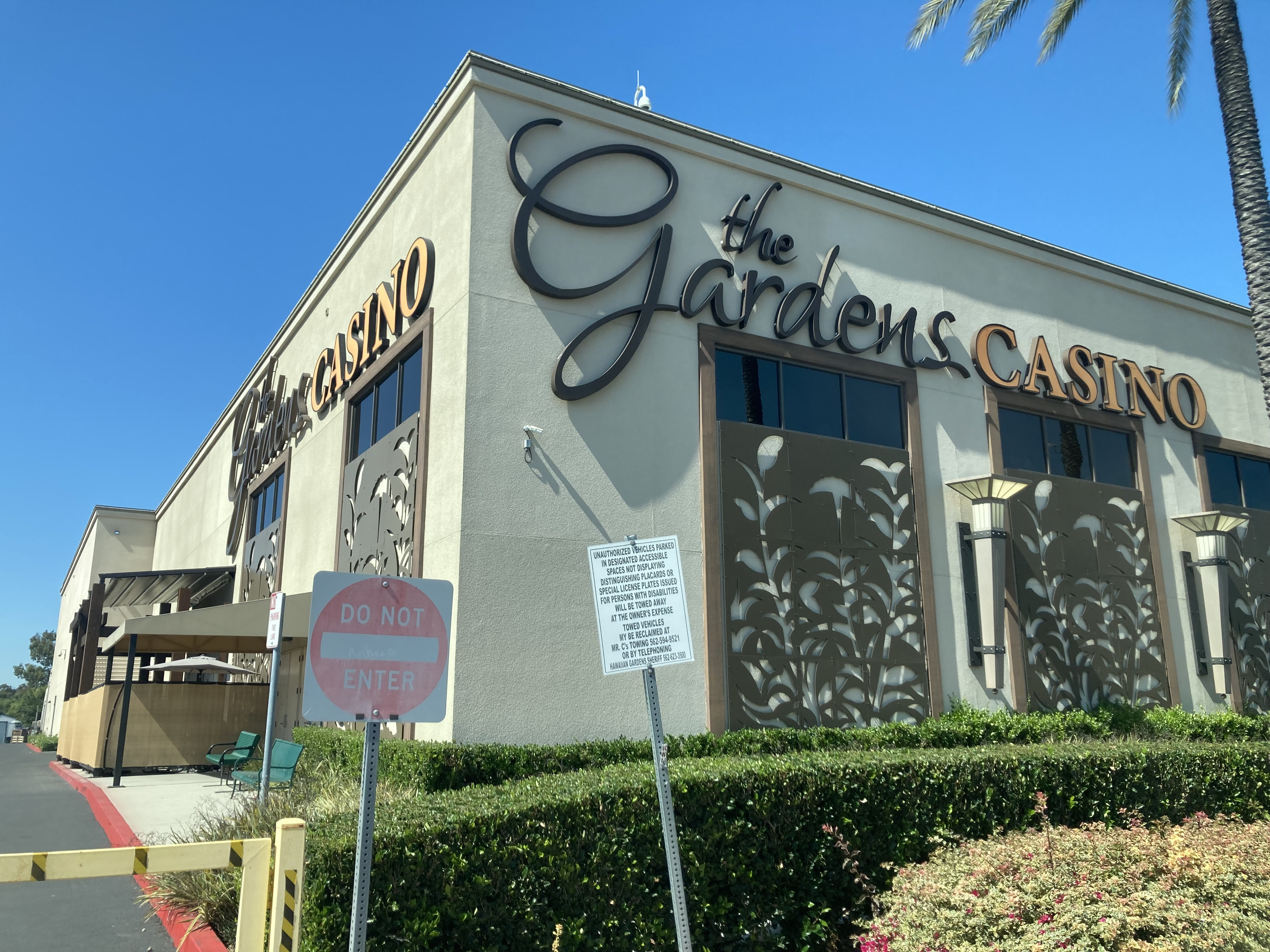
- Interactive map of Gardens Casino
- Location: Hawaiian Gardens, California; 11871 E. Carson St. Hawaiian Gardens, California 90716
- Opened: 1997
- Casino type: Land-based
- Owner: Irving Moskowitz
- Previous names: Hawaiian Gardens Casino; Hawaiian Gardens
- Website: www.thegardenscasino.com

The Gardens Casino is a cardroom casino located in Hawaiian Gardens, California. The casino was founded in 1997 and only offers card games. The casino started with a space of 59,900 square feet. In 2016, the casino underwent a $90 million renovation and expanded to 200,000 square feet.

In 2017, the casino faced a possible loss of license after admitting it failed to follow federal anti-money laundering laws. Keith Sharp, the Gardens Casino’s general counsel, stated managers have taken responsibility for the failure and "have made tremendous steps in improving our programs".

On December 5, 2019, California Attorney General Xavier Becerra announced a $3.1 million settlement with Hawaiian Gardens Casino for “misleading gambling regulators and violating the Bank Secrecy Act.” The settlement was in addition to the $2.8 million penalty imposed on the casino by the U.S. Treasury Department’s Financial Crimes Enforcement Network. The casino was also required to complete a 24-month compliance period to meet the terms of the settlement.

The television webcast show, Poker Night in America, has hosted shows at the casino, including a live show that was broadcast in March 2018.

== See also ==
- List of casinos in California
