= Thunder Valley Casino Resort =

Casino in Placer County, California, United States

- Interactive map of Thunder Valley Casino Resort
- Location: near Lincoln, California, U.S.; 1200 Athens Avenue; 38°50′27″N 121°18′44″W
- Opened: June 9, 2003; 23 years ago
- No. of rooms: 300
- Gaming space: 144,500 sq ft (13,420 m^{2})
- Notable restaurants: Cafe; The Buffet (until 2020); Food Court: Fatburger, Panda Express, Peet's Coffee & Tea, Pizza Hut and Subway; High Steaks; Red Lantern
- Casino type: Native American
- Owner: United Auburn Indian Community
- Architect: JMA Architecture Studios
- Renovated in: Expansion: July 2010
- Website: thundervalleyresort.com

Thunder Valley Casino Resort is an American hotel and casino located in unincorporated Placer County, California in Whitney, California near the city of Lincoln, California, 30 miles (48 km) northeast of Sacramento. It is owned and operated by the United Auburn Indian Community and designed by architect Edward Vance of JMA Architecture Studios, located in Las Vegas, Nevada. The resort opened on June 9, 2003. It was operated by Station Casinos from 2003 to 2010.

The 275,000-square-foot (25,550 m^{2}) facility offers a variety of gaming including slot machines, live poker and various other table games.

== History ==
Thunder Valley Casino Resort is owned by the United Auburn Indian Community, a Native American tribe consisting of mostly Miwuk and Maidu Indians indigenous to the Sacramento Valley region. In the 1950s and '60s, the United States government terminated 41 California rancherias—mini-reservations, including that of the Miwok and Maidu Auburn band. As a way to lift themselves out of poverty, the members of the tribe decided to build a casino after Congress restored the tribe's federal status in 1994, allowing the tribe to acquire land under tribal sovereignty.

The United Auburn Indian Community entered into a tribal-state gaming compact with the State of California in September 1999 in order to conduct Class III gaming on trust land. This compact was later successfully renegotiated with Governor Arnold Schwarzenegger in 2004.

Thunder Valley was designed by JMA Architecture Studios and built by the PENTA Building Group. The casino was opened in June 2003 and then expanded starting in March 2009 and finishing July 2010. Designed by Las Vegas Architect Paul Steelman of Steelman Partners, with JMA serving as the Architect of Record, the expansion included the build-out of an additional 80,000 square feet of gaming floor space (adding approximately 1,800 slots), a 30,000 square foot luxury spa and fitness facility, and 30,000 square foot convention and meeting room space. In addition to the casino expansion, the project consisted of a 12-story, 297 room hotel tower and a 7-story parking garage.

The UAIC is known for their efforts to abide by state and local land-use laws, even though they are not obligated to do so under sovereignty law. For example, the UAIC chose to include the California Environmental Quality Act in its local agreement, something only a handful of tribes submit to.

== Gambling ==
The casino has over 3,000 slot and video machines, 125 table games (including blackjack and paigow) and a live poker room with enough space for 160 players. The casino regularly holds promotions and special events including drawings, cash prizes, and tournaments.

== Attractions ==
The expansion completed in July 2010 includes a 17-story luxury hotel with 408 rooms, with 46 suites. Inside the hotel is a large banquet and entertainment hall (Pano Hall) with the capacity of 1,000 guests, meeting rooms, bars and a gift shop. The pool has surrounding private cabanas and a poolside bar, Coconut. There are a total of 14 restaurants and bars.

The spa offers facials, massages, pedicures, manicures, Lomi Lomi, hot stone massages, and the signature 24-karat gold leaf facial. There is also a sauna, whirlpool, steam room, and health club. Steelman Partners was the architect and interior designers. shop12 was the lighting designers for the major expansion in 2010.

Thunder Valley Casino Resort hosts a number of concerts and shows in the summertime in their outdoor amphitheater.

== Entertainment ==
=== The Venue ===
The Venue at Thunder Valley is a new $100 million entertainment venue which opening on February 17, 2023 with a performance by the Eagles. It hosts 4,500 seats inside a 150,000 square foot state-of-the art theater.

==== Events ====
A list of events at The Venue
Date	Event	Tour	Attendance	Revenue	Notes
February 17	Eagles	Hotel California 2023 Tour	—	—	Opening night of The Venue
February 18	Bruno Mars		—	—	—
February 19	Santana	Blessings and Miracles Tour	—	—	—
February 24–25	Gabriel Iglesias		—	—	—
March 3	Sammy Hagar And Friends	Live	—	—	—
March 4	Charlie Wilson		—	—	After 7 will serve as opening act
March 11	Xuan Hoi NGO	Vietnamese Show	—	—	First foreign event
March 17	Dirty Heads		—	—	Common Kings will serve as opening act
March 18	The Beach Boys		—	—	—
March 24	Jeff Dunham	Still Not Canceled	—	—	—
March 25	Anjelah Johnson-Reyes		—	—	—
March 31	Kevin James	The Irregardless Tour	—	—	—
April 1	Kansas		—	—	Blue Öyster Cult will serve as opening act
April 7	Boyz II Men		—	—	Troop and Soul For Real will serve as opening acts
April 8	Michael Carbonaro	Lies On Stage	—	—	—
April 14	Third Eye Blind	An Evening with Third Eye Blind	—	—	—
April 15	One Vision of Queen		—	—	—
April 22	Vivian Chow	A Long and Lasting Love	—	—	—
April 28	Bryan Adams	So Happy It Hurts Tour	—	—	—
April 29	Train				
May 5	Mi Banda El Mexicano, Banda Marcos, Banda Maguey	Quebradita Time!	—	—	—
May 6	The Black Crowes		—	—	—
May 12	Sarah Silverman				
May 13	John Fogerty				
May 19	Frankie Valli and The Four Seasons		—	—	—
May 20	Journey				
May 25–26	Eraserheads	Huling El Bimbo Tour	—	—	—
May 27	REO Speedwagon		—	—	John Waite will serve as opening act
June 2	Kid Rock	Bad Reputation Tour	—	—	—
June 3	V101 Summer Jam, Nelly, Bone Thugs-n-Harmony, Chingy, Twista, Luniz		—	—	—
June 8	Kevin Hart	Reality Check Tour			
June 9	Ringo Starr and His All Star Band		—	—	—
June 10	Tesla	Full Throttle Live 2023	—	—	Buckcherry will serve as opening act
June 17	Australia's Thunder from Down Under		—	—	—
June 23	Johnny Mathis	The Voice of Romance Tour	—	—	—
August 11	The Australian Pink Floyd Show		—	—	—
October 27	Janet Jackson	Together Again Tour	—	—	—
November 4	Gwen Stefani		—	—	—
February 3, 2024	Duran Duran		—	—	—
February 17, 2024	Red Hot Chili Peppers	Global Stadium Tour		—	—
April 20, 2024	Wakin Chau	The Younger Me Concert Tour	—	—	—
May 31, 2024	Sublime with Rome	Farewell Tour			

== Philanthropy ==
Using the revenue generated from Thunder Valley, the UAIC gives about $1 million annually to nonprofit groups in Placer County. Some beneficiaries of ongoing and previous donations include the Lighthouse Counseling & Family Resource Center, Sutter Auburn Faith Hospital Foundation, and Foothill Volunteer Center.

In January 2005, the UAIC donated $250,000 to assist Habitat for Humanity International's (HFHI) relief efforts in southern Asia following the 2004 Indian Ocean earthquake and tsunami.

In January 2010, the UAIC donated $50,000 to Partners in Health for their efforts in the 2010 Haiti earthquake aftermath.

== See also ==
- List of casinos in California
