= WPT Five Diamond World Poker Classic =

- Current season, competition or edition: World Poker Tour season 20 results
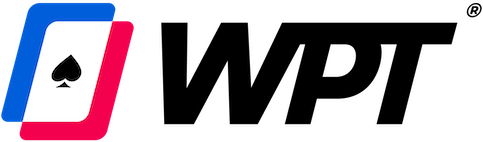
- Game: Poker
- Founded: May 27, 2002
- First season: Season 1 (I)
- Venues: Bellagio Resort & Casino; Las Vegas, Nevada
- Most recent champions: (United States) Chad Eveslage ($1,042,300)
- Sponsor: World Poker Tour
- Tournament format: No-Limit Hold'em; Multiple reentry
- Website: www.worldpokertour.com

The WPT Five Diamond World Poker Classic is an annual tournament as part of the World Poker Tour that is played out at Bellagio Resort & Casino in Las Vegas, Nevada. It has been part of every season of the World Poker Tour after being the inaugural event in Season 1 (I) in 2002.

== History ==
The World Poker Tour's first-ever event was the WPT Five Diamond World Poker Classic that began on May 27, 2002. Gus Hansen was crowned the first champion and also became the first player to final table this event twice when he finished third in Season 2 (II) behind eventual winner Paul Phillips. Season 2 (II) would see the date of the event shifted to December where it currently remains on the schedule every season. In Season 3 (III) the buy-in was raised from $10,200 to $15,300 and Daniel Negreanu won the event.

The $15,000 buy-in remained through to Season 8 (VIII) before it was reduced back to $10,000. In Season 9 (IX), Antonio Esfandiari won the event which would be the first of his three consecutive final table appearances as he finished sixth in Season 10 (X) and fourth in Season 11 (XI). Andrew Lichtenberger also has three final tables in this event with two coming back-to-back in Season 10 (X) and Season 11 (XI).

Two players have both won an event and finished runner-up. Ryan Tosoc finished second in Season 15 (XV) before winning in Season 16 (XVI), while Alex Foxen finished second in Season 16 (XVI) before winning in Season 18 (XVIII).

The event was moved to October for Season 20 (XX), which was the first time it wasn't held in December since the inaugural season. Chad Eveslage won his second WPT title and $1,042,300 after he defeated Steve Buckner.

From Season 16 (XVI), the final tables were streamed on PokerGO.

== Event winners ==
WPT Five Diamond World Poker Classic Event Winners
Season	Date	Winner	Prize	Runner-up	Entrants	Buy-in	Prize Pool	Payouts	Results
1 (I)	May 27-June 1, 2002	(Denmark) Gus Hansen	$556,460	(Indonesia) John Juanda	146	$10,200	$1,416,200	18	Results
2 (II)	December 15–18, 2003	(United States) Paul Phillips	$1,101,908	(United States) Dewey Temko	314	$10,200	$3,044,750	36	Results
3 (III)	December 14–18, 2004	(Canada) Daniel Negreanu	$1,770,218	(Costa Rica) Humberto Brenes	376	$15,300	$5,470,800	50	Results
4 (IV)	December 12–16, 2005	(Denmark) Rehne Pedersen	$2,078,185	(Finland) Patrik Antonius	555	$15,300	$8,075,250	100	Results
5 (V)	December 14–19, 2006	(Australia) Joe Hachem	$2,207,575	(United States) Jim Hanna	583	$15,400	$8,482,650	100	Results
6 (VI)	December 12–18, 2007	(Ukraine) Eugene Katchalov	$2,482,605	(United States) Ted Kearly	626	$15,400	$9,390,000	100	Results
7 (VII)	December 13–19, 2008	(United States) David Rheem	$1,538,730	(United States) Justin Young	497	$15,400	$7,231,350	100	Results
8 (VIII)	December 13–19, 2009	(United States) Daniel Alaei	$1,428,430	(United States) Josh Arieh	329	$15,400	$4,761,450	27	Results
9 (IX)	December 3–8, 2010	(United States) Antonio Esfandiari	$870,124	(United States) Andrew Robl	438	$10,300	$4,261,267	100	Results
10 (X)	December 6–11, 2011	(United Kingdom) James Dempsey	$821,612	(United States) Soi Nguyen	413	$10,300	$4,006,100	100	Results
11 (XI)	December 4–9, 2012	(United States) Ravi Raghavan	$1,268,571	(Canada) Shawn Buchanan	503	$10,300	$4,879,100	54	Results
12 (XII)	December 6–11, 2013	(United States) Dan Smith	$1,161,135	(Australia) Gary Benson	449	$10,300	$4,355,300	45	Results
13 (XIII)	December 15–20, 2014	(United States) Mohsin Charania	$1,477,890	(United States) Garrett Greer	586	$10,300	$5,684,200	54	Results
14 (XIV)	December 14–19, 2015	(United States) Kevin Eyster	$1,587,382	(United States) Bill Jennings	639	$10,400	$6,198,300	63	Results
15 (XV)	December 5–10, 2016	(United States) James Romero	$1,938,118	(United States) Ryan Tosoc	791	$10,400	$7,672,700	72	Results
16 (XVI)	December 5–10, 2017	(United States) Ryan Tosoc	$1,958,065	(United States) Alex Foxen	812	$10,400	$7,876,400	81	Results
17 (XVII)	December 11–15, 2018	(United States) Dylan Linde	$1,631,468	(Serbia) Milos Skrbic	1,001	$10,400	$9,709,700	126	Results
18 (XVIII)	December 16–21, 2019	(United States) Alex Foxen	$1,694,995	(Republic of Ireland) Toby Joyce	1,035	$10,400	$10,039,500	130	Results
19 (XIX)	December 15–19, 2021	(United States) Taylor Black	$1,241,430	(United States) Vikenty Shegal	716	$10,400	$6,945,200	90	Results
20 (XX)	October 19–23, 2022	(United States) Chad Eveslage	$1,042,300	(United States) Steve Buckner	569	$10,400	$5,519,300	72	Results

== Event results ==
=== Season 1 (I): WPT Five Diamond World Poker Classic ===
- 5-Day Event: May 27-June 1, 2002
- Buy-in: $10,200
- Number of Entrants: 146
- Total Prize Pool: $1,416,200
- Number of Payouts: 18
- Winning Hand: K♠ K♣

Final Table Results
Place	Name	Prize
1st	(Denmark) Gus Hansen	$556,460
2nd	(Indonesia) John Juanda	$278,240
3rd	(Lebanon) Freddy Deeb	$139,120
4th	(United States) John Hennigan	$83,472
5th	(Switzerland) Chris Bigler	$62,604
6th	(United States) Scotty Nguyen	$48,692

=== Season 2 (II): WPT Five Diamond World Poker Classic ===
- 4-Day Event: December 15–18, 2003
- Buy-in: $10,200
- Number of Entrants: 314
- Total Prize Pool: $3,044,750
- Number of Payouts: 36
- Winning Hand: 7♦ 7♥

Final Table Results
Place	Name	Prize
1st	(United States) Paul Phillips	$1,101,908
2nd	(United States) Dewey Tomko	$552,853
3rd	(Denmark) Gus Hansen	$276,426
4th	(United States) Abe Mosseri	$174,585
5th	(Australia) Tino Lechich	$130,940
6th	(Australia) Mel Judah	$101,842

=== Season 3 (III): WPT Five Diamond World Poker Classic ===
- 5-Day Event: December 14–18, 2004
- Buy-in: $15,300
- Number of Entrants: 376
- Total Prize Pool: $5,470,800
- Number of Payouts: 50
- Winning Hand: K♣ 7♦

Final Table Results
Place	Name	Prize
1st	(Canada) Daniel Negreanu	$1,770,218
2nd	(Costa Rica) Humberto Brenes	$923,475
3rd	(United States) Vinny Landrum	$462,851
4th	(United States) Jennifer Harman	$299,492
5th	(United States) Steve Rassi	$217,812
6th	(United States) Nam Le	$152,468

=== Season 4 (IV): WPT Five Diamond World Poker Classic ===
- 5-Day Event: December 12–16, 2005
- Buy-in: $15,300
- Number of Entrants: 555
- Total Prize Pool: $8,075,250
- Number of Payouts: 100
- Winning Hand: 8♣ 8♠

Final Table Results
Place	Name	Prize
1st	(Denmark) Rehne Pedersen	$2,078,185
2nd	(Finland) Patrik Antonius	$1,046,470
3rd	(United States) Doyle Brunson	$563,485
4th	(Taiwan) J.J. Liu	$362,140
5th	(United States) Darrell Dicken	$241,495
6th	(United States) Phil Laak	$160,995

=== Season 5 (V): WPT Five Diamond World Poker Classic ===
- 6-Day Event: December 14–19, 2006
- Buy-in: $15,400
- Number of Entrants: 583
- Total Prize Pool: $8,482,650
- Number of Payouts: 100
- Winning Hand: A♠ 6♣

Final Table Results
Place	Name	Prize
1st	(Australia) Joe Hachem	$2,207,575
2nd	(United States) Jim Hanna	$1,099,430
3rd	(Canada) Daniel Negreanu	$592,000
4th	(Denmark) Mads Andersen	$380,630
5th	(United States) David Redlin	$253,715
6th	(United States) Edward Jordan	$169,145

=== Season 6 (VI): WPT Five Diamond World Poker Classic ===
- 7-Day Event: December 12–18, 2007
- Buy-in: $15,400
- Number of Entrants: 626
- Total Prize Pool: $9,390,000
- Number of Payouts: 100
- Winning Hand: J♥ 10♦

Final Table Results
Place	Name	Prize
1st	(Ukraine) Eugene Katchalov	$2,482,605
2nd	(United States) Ted Kearly	$1,252,640
3rd	(United Kingdom) Dave Ulliott	$674,500
4th	(United States) Kenneth Rosen	$433,675
5th	(United States) Jordan Rich	$289,070
6th	(United States) Ryan Daut	$192,715

=== Season 7 (VII): WPT Five Diamond World Poker Classic ===
- 7-Day Event: December 13–19, 2008
- Buy-in: $15,400
- Number of Entrants: 497
- Total Prize Pool: $7,231,350
- Number of Payouts: 100
- Winning Hand: K♦ K♠

Final Table Results
Place	Name	Prize
1st	(United States) David Rheem	$1,538,730
2nd	(United States) Justin Young	$936,760
3rd	(United States) Evan McNiff	$540,440
4th	(United States) Steve Sung	$396,205
5th	(United States) Amnon Filippi	$288,235
6th	(United States) Hoyt Corkins	$216,175

=== Season 8 (VIII): WPT Five Diamond World Poker Classic ===
- 7-Day Event: December 13–19, 2009
- Buy-in: $15,400
- Number of Entrants: 329
- Total Prize Pool: $4,761,450
- Number of Payouts: 27
- Winning Hand: 10♥ 8♦

Final Table Results
Place	Name	Prize
1st	(United States) Daniel Alaei	$1,428,430
2nd	(United States) Josh Arieh	$952,290
3rd	(United States) Faraz Jaka	$571,374
4th	(Canada) Shawn Buchanan	$333,302
5th	(United States) Scotty Nguyen	$249,976
6th	(Republic of Ireland) Steve O'Dwyer	$202,362

=== Season 9 (IX): WPT Five Diamond World Poker Classic ===
- 6-Day Event: December 3–8, 2010
- Buy-in: $10,300
- Number of Entrants: 438
- Total Prize Pool: $4,261,267
- Number of Payouts: 100
- Winning Hand: K♣ J♦

Final Table Results
Place	Name	Prize
1st	(United States) Antonio Esfandiari	$870,124
2nd	(United States) Andrew Robl	$549,003
3rd	(United States) Vanessa Rousso	$358,964
4th	(United States) John Racener	$232,271
5th	(United States) Kirk Morrison	$168,924
6th	(United States) Ted Lawson	$126,693

=== Season 10 (X): WPT Five Diamond World Poker Classic ===
- 6-Day Event: December 6–11, 2011
- Buy-in: $10,300
- Number of Entrants: 413
- Total Prize Pool: $4,006,100
- Number of Payouts: 100
- Winning Hand: K♥ Q♣

Final Table Results
Place	Name	Prize
1st	(United Kingdom) James Dempsey	$821,612
2nd	(United States) Soi Nguyen	$517,478
3rd	(United States) Vanessa Selbst	$338,351
4th	(United States) Andrew Lichtenberger	$218,933
5th	(Portugal) Vitor Coelho	$159,224
6th	(United States) Antonio Esfandiari	$119,418

=== Season 11 (XI): WPT Five Diamond World Poker Classic ===
- 6-Day Event: December 4–9, 2012
- Buy-in: $10,300
- Number of Entrants: 503
- Total Prize Pool: $4,879,100
- Number of Payouts: 54
- Winning Hand: 7♥ 7♣

Final Table Results
Place	Name	Prize
1st	(United States) Ravi Raghavan	$1,268,571
2nd	(Canada) Shawn Buchanan	$746,502
3rd	(United States) Thomas Winters	$483,031
4th	(United States) Antonio Esfandiari	$329,339
5th	(United States) Andrew Lichtenberger	$234,197
6th	(United States) Jeremy Kottler	$187,845

=== Season 12 (XII): WPT Five Diamond World Poker Classic ===
- 6-Day Event: December 6–11, 2013
- Buy-in: $10,300
- Number of Entrants: 449
- Total Prize Pool: $4,355,300
- Number of Payouts: 45
- Winning Hand: K♠ 10♦

Final Table Results
Place	Name	Prize
1st	(United States) Dan Smith	$1,161,135
2nd	(Australia) Gary Benson	$672,685
3rd	(United States) Eddy Sabat	$436,160
4th	(United States) Shaun Suller	$303,793
5th	(United States) Barry Hutter	$219,165
6th	(United States) Joe Serock	$175,766

=== Season 13 (XIII): WPT Five Diamond World Poker Classic ===
- 6-Day Event: December 15–20, 2014
- Buy-in: $10,300
- Number of Entrants: 586
- Total Prize Pool: $5,684,200
- Number of Payouts: 54
- Winning Hand: 9♥ 6♦

Final Table Results
Place	Name	Prize
1st	(United States) Mohsin Charania	$1,477,890
2nd	(United States) Garrett Greer	$869,683
3rd	(United States) Brett Shaffer	$562,736
4th	(United States) Ryan Julius	$383,684
5th	(United States) Ryan Fee	$272,842
6th	(Germany) Tobias Reinkemeier	$218,842

=== Season 14 (XIV): WPT Five Diamond World Poker Classic ===
- 6-Day Event: December 14–19, 2015
- Buy-in: $10,400
- Number of Entrants: 639
- Total Prize Pool: $6,198,300
- Number of Payouts: 63
- Winning Hand: A♦ Q♣

Final Table Results
Place	Name	Prize
1st	(United States) Kevin Eyster	$1,587,382
2nd	(United States) Bill Jennings	$929,745
3rd	(United States) Ben Yu	$607,433
4th	(United States) Jake Schwartz	$412,187
5th	(United States) Cate Hall	$291,320
6th	(United States) Eddie Ochana	$226,238

=== Season 15 (XV): WPT Five Diamond World Poker Classic ===
- 6-Day Event: December 5–10, 2016
- Buy-in: $10,400
- Number of Entrants: 791
- Total Prize Pool: $7,672,700
- Number of Payouts: 72
- Winning Hand: K♦ K♥

Final Table Results
Place	Name	Prize
1st	(United States) James Romero	$1,938,118
2nd	(United States) Ryan Tosoc	$1,124,051
3rd	(United States) Jake Schindler	$736,579
4th	(United States) Alex Condon	$494,889
5th	(United States) Justin Bonomo	$345,272
6th	(Ukraine) Igor Yaroshevskyy	$268,545

=== Season 16 (XVI): WPT Five Diamond World Poker Classic ===
- 6-Day Event: December 5–10, 2017
- Buy-in: $10,400
- Number of Entrants: 812
- Total Prize Pool: $7,876,400
- Number of Payouts: 81
- Winning Hand: Q♣ 10♥

Final Table Results
Place	Name	Prize
1st	(United States) Ryan Tosoc	$1,958,065
2nd	(United States) Alex Foxen	$1,134,202
3rd	(United States) Mike Del Vecchio	$752,196
4th	(United States) Sean Perry	$504,090
5th	(United States) Ajay Chabra	$350,500
6th	(United States) Richard Kirsch	$271,736

=== Season 17 (XVII): WPT Five Diamond World Poker Classic ===
- 5-Day Event: December 11–15, 2018
- Buy-in: $10,400
- Number of Entrants: 1,001
- Total Prize Pool: $9,709,700
- Number of Payouts: 126
- Winning Hand: J♠ J♥

Final Table Results
Place	Name	Prize
1st	(United States) Dylan Linde	$1,631,468
2nd	(Serbia) Milos Skrbic	$1,087,603
3rd	(United States) Andrew Lichtenberger	$802,973
4th	(United States) Ping Liu	$599,147
5th	(United States) Lisa Hamilton	$451,880
6th	(United States) Barry Hutter	$344,529

=== Season 18 (XVIII): WPT Five Diamond World Poker Classic ===
- 5-Day Event: December 16–21, 2019
- Buy-in: $10,400
- Number of Entrants: 1,035
- Total Prize Pool: $10,039,500
- Number of Payouts: 130
- Winning Hand: A♣ J♠

Final Table Results
Place	Name	Prize
1st	(United States) Alex Foxen	$1,694,995
2nd	(Republic of Ireland) Toby Joyce	$1,120,040
3rd	(United States) Seth Davies	$827,285
4th	(United States) Peter Neff	$617,480
5th	(United States) Daniel Park	$465,780
6th	(United States) Jonathan Jaffe	$355,125

=== Season 19 (XIX): WPT Five Diamond World Poker Classic ===
- 5-Day Event: December 15–19, 2021
- Buy-in: $10,400
- Number of Entrants: 716
- Total Prize Pool: $6,945,200
- Number of Payouts: 90
- Winning Hand: A♥ K♠

Final Table Results
Place	Name	Prize
1st	(United States) Taylor Black	$1,241,430
2nd	(United States) Vikenty Shegal	$827,620
3rd	(Italy) Gianluca Speranza	$609,960
4th	(France) Lorenzo Lavis	$454,590
5th	(United States) Mohsin Charania	$342,645
6th	(United States) David Kim	$261,235

=== Season 20 (XX): WPT Five Diamond World Poker Classic ===
- 5-Day Event: October 19–23, 2022
- Buy-in: $10,400
- Number of Entrants: 569
- Total Prize Pool: $5,519,300
- Number of Payouts: 72
- Winning Hand: 7♥ 5♦

Final Table Results
Place	Name	Prize
1st	(United States) Chad Eveslage	$1,042,300
2nd	(United States) Steve Buckner	$690,000
3rd	(Belgium) Michael Gathy	$505,000
4th	(United States) Brian Kim	$377,000
5th	(United States) Albert Calderon	$283,000
6th	(United States) David Kim	$216,000
7th	(United States) Zachary Donovan	$166,000

== Multiple final tables ==
Both Antonio Esfandiari and Andrew Lichtenberger have made three final tables each. Esfandiari made three consecutive final tables from Season 9 (IX) to Season 11 (XI), while two of Lichtenberger's final tables came back-to-back in Season 10 (X) and Season 11 (XI).

Players with Multiple Final Tables
Name	Total	Wins
(United States) Antonio Esfandiari	3	1
(United States) Andrew Lichtenberger	3	0
(United States) Alex Foxen	2	1
(Denmark) Gus Hansen	2	1
(Canada) Daniel Negreanu	2	1
(United States) Ryan Tosoc	2	1
(United States) Mohsin Charania	2	1
(United States) Barry Hutter	2	0
(United States) Scotty Nguyen	2	0
(Canada) Shawn Buchanan	2	0
(United States) David Kim	2	0

== Biggest payouts ==
Below is a list of players that have cashed for over $1,000,000 at the WPT Five Diamond World Poker Classic in a single event.

WPT Five Diamond World Poker Classic Biggest Payouts
Rank	Player	Prize	Place	Season
1	(Ukraine) Eugene Katchalov	$2,482,605	1st	6 (VI)
2	(Australia) Joe Hachem	$2,207,575	1st	5 (V)
3	(Denmark) Rehne Pedersen	$2,078,185	1st	4 (IV)
4	(United States) Ryan Tosoc	$1,958,065	1st	16 (XVI)
5	(United States) James Romero	$1,938,118	1st	15 (XV)
6	(Canada) Daniel Negreanu	$1,770,218	1st	3 (III)
7	(United States) Alex Foxen	$1,694,995	1st	18 (XVIII)
8	(United States) Dylan Linde	$1,631,468	1st	17 (XVII)
9	(United States) Kevin Eyster	$1,587,382	1st	14 (XIV)
10	(United States) David Rheem	$1,538,730	1st	7 (VII)
11	(United States) Mohsin Charania	$1,477,890	1st	13 (XIII)
12	(United States) Daniel Alaei	$1,428,430	1st	8 (VIII)
13	(United States) Ravi Raghavan	$1,268,571	1st	11 (XI)
14	(United States) Ted Kearly	$1,252,640	2nd	6 (VI)
15	(United States) Taylor Black	$1,241,430	1st	19 (XIX)
15	(United States) Dan Smith	$1,161,135	1st	12 (XII)
16	(United States) Alex Foxen	$1,134,202	2nd	16 (XVI)
17	(United States) Ryan Tosoc	$1,124,051	2nd	15 (XV)
18	(Republic of Ireland) Toby Joyce	$1,120,040	2nd	18 (XVIII)
19	(United States) Paul Phillips	$1,101,908	1st	2 (II)
20	(United States) Jim Hanna	$1,099,430	2nd	5 (V)
21	(Serbia) Milos Skrbic	$1,087,603	2nd	17 (XVII)
22	(Finland) Patrik Antonius	$1,046,470	2nd	4 (IV)
23	(United States) Chad Eveslage	$1,042,300	1st	20 (XX)
