= World Poker Tour season 14 results =

Below are the results for season 14 (XIV) of the World Poker Tour (2015–16).

== Results ==
=== Canadian Spring Championship ===
- Casino: Playground Poker Club, Kahnawake, Quebec
- Buy-in: $3,500
- 6-Day Event: May 1–6, 2015
- Number of Entries: 370
- Total Prize Pool: $1,148,480
- Number of Payouts: 45

Final Table
Place	Name	Prize (CAD)
1st	(Canada) Sheraz Nasir	$255,408
2nd	(United States) Lu Zhang	$166,402
3rd	(Canada) Levi Stevens	$106,820
4th	(Canada) Gary Lucci	$79,130
5th	(Canada) Trevor Delaney	$59,340
6th	(United States) Dylan Wilkerson	$47,470

=== WPT Amsterdam ===
- Casino: Holland Casino, Amsterdam, Netherlands
- Buy-in: €3,300
- 6-Day Event: May 11–16, 2015
- Number of Entries: 341
- Total Prize Pool: €992,310
- Number of Payouts: 45

Final Table
Place	Name	Prize
1st	(Morocco) Farid Yachou	€201,000
2nd	(England) Steve Warburton	€150,000
3rd	(Netherlands) Kees van Brugge	€90,000
4th	(Sweden) Fredrik Andersson	€68,000
5th	(Netherlands) Joep van den Bijgaart	€51,000
6th	(United States) Jason Wheeler	€41,260

=== WPT Choctaw ===
- Casino: Choctaw Casino Resort, Durant, Oklahoma
- Buy-in: $3,700
- 5-Day Event: July 31 – August 4, 2015
- Number of Entries: 1,175
- Total Prize Pool: $3,989,125
- Number of Payouts: 145

Final Table
Place	Name	Prize
1st	(United States) Jason Brin	$682,975
2nd	(United States) Andy Hwang	$468,105
3rd	(United States) Darren Elias	$303,593
4th	(United States) Jake Schindler	$224,913
5th	(United States) Mina Greco	$167,691
6th	(Australia) Alex Lynskey	$135,504

=== Legends of Poker ===
- Casino: The Bicycle Hotel & Casino, Bell Gardens, California
- Buy-in: $3,700
- 7-Day Event: August 29 – September 4, 2015
- Number of Entries: 786
- Total Prize Pool: $2,630,349
- Number of Payouts: 72

Final Table
Place	Name	Prize
1st	(United States) Mike Shariati	$675,942
2nd	(United States) Freddy Deeb	$383,090
3rd	(United States) Brent Roberts	$251,035
4th	(United States) Aaron Kweskin	$168,664
5th	(United States) Stan Jablonski	$117,673
6th	(United States) Craig Chait	$91,523

=== Borgata Poker Open ===
- Casino: Borgata Hotel Casino & Spa, Atlantic City, New Jersey
- Buy-in: $3,500
- 6-Day Event: September 20–25, 2015
- Number of Entries: 1,027
- Total Prize Pool: $3,287,427
- Number of Payouts: 100

Final Table
Place	Name	Prize
1st	(United States) David Paredes	$723,227
2nd	(United States) James Gilbert	$434,598
3rd	(United States) Joe Kuether	$262,994
4th	(United States) Maurice Hawkins	$220,258
5th	(United States) Jerry Payne	$180,808
6th	(United States) Roman Valerstein	$146,291

=== WPT Maryland Live ===
- Casino: Maryland Live! Casino, Hanover, Maryland
- Buy-in: $3,500
- 5-Day Event: September 25–29, 2015
- Number of Entries: 337
- Total Prize Pool: $1,063,000
- Number of Payouts: 36

Final Table
Place	Name	Prize
1st	(United States) Aaron Mermelstein	$250,222
2nd	(United States) Xin Wang	$164,765
3rd	(United States) Andjelko Andrejevic	$105,981
4th	(United States) Greg Merson	$78,449
5th	(United States) Cate Hall	$58,890
6th	(United States) Ken Holmes	$47,091

=== Emperors Palace Poker Classic ===
- Casino: Emperors Palace Hotel Casino, Johannesburg, South Africa
- Buy-in: $3,600
- 4-Day Event: October 29 – November 1, 2015
- Number of Entries: 135
- Total Prize Pool: $312,030
- Number of Payouts: 15

Final Table
Place	Name	Prize
1st	(South Africa) Ben Cade	$100,000
2nd	(South Africa) Mark Lifman	$57,685
3rd	(United States) Aaron Overton	$37,417
4th	(United States) Nipun Java	$25,724
5th	(Sweden) Diana Svensk	$19,800
6th	(South Africa) Dean Doucha	$15,435

=== WPT UK ===
- Casino: Dusk Till Dawn Poker & Casino, Nottingham, England
- Buy-in: £2,200
- 6-Day Event: November 3–8, 2015
- Number of Entries: 450
- Total Prize Pool: £1,000,000
- Number of Payouts: 54

Final Table
Place	Name	Prize
1st	(United Kingdom) Iaron Lightbourne	£200,000
2nd	(United Kingdom) Craig McCorkell	£140,000
3rd	(United Kingdom) Fraser Bellamy	£90,000
4th	(United Kingdom) Andrew Seden	£65,000
5th	(United Kingdom) Russell Betts	£50,000
6th	(United Kingdom) Chi Zhang	£40,000

=== bestbet Poker Scramble ===
- Casino: bestbet Jacksonville, Jacksonville, Florida
- Buy-in: $5,000
- 5-Day Event: November 6–10, 2015
- Number of Entries: 412
- Total Prize Pool: $1,915,800
- Number of Payouts: 53

Final Table
Place	Name	Prize
1st	(United States) Tyler Patterson	$375,270
2nd	(United States) Benjamin Zamani	$252,267
3rd	(United States) Stan Jablonski	$162,210
4th	(United States) Marvin Karlins	$119,957
5th	(United States) Ryan Dunn	$90,057
6th	(United States) Jake Schwartz	$72,153

=== WPT Montreal ===
- Casino: Playground Poker Club, Kahnawake, Quebec
- Buy-in: $3,850
- 7-Day Event: November 13–19, 2015
- Number of Entries: 697
- Total Prize Pool: $2,366,315
- Number of Payouts: 81

Final Table
Place	Name	Prize (CAD)
1st	(United States) Jared Mahoney	$453,122
2nd	(United States) Darryll Fish	$304,343
3rd	(Germany) Rainer Kempe	$195,940
4th	(United States) Brian Altman	$144,780
5th	(Canada) Carter Swidler	$108,410
6th	(United States) A.J. Gambino	$87,520

=== WPT Prague ===
- Casino: King's Casino Prague, Prague, Czech Republic
- Buy-in: €3,300
- 6-Day Event: December 1–6, 2015
- Number of Entries: 256
- Total Prize Pool: €730,340
- Number of Payouts: 27

Final Table
Place	Name	Prize
1st	(Spain) Javier Gomez	€175,000
2nd	(Moldova) Pavel Plesuv	€120,000
3rd	(Bulgaria) Fahredin Mustafov	€77,500
4th	(Portugal) Pedro Marques	€57,400
5th	(Algeria) Abdelkader Benhalima	€43,000
6th	(Denmark) Henrik Hecklen	€34,100

=== Five Diamond World Poker Classic ===
- Casino: Bellagio Resort & Casino, Las Vegas, Nevada
- Buy-in: $10,400
- 6-Day Event: December 14–19, 2015
- Number of Entries: 639
- Total Prize Pool: $6,198,300
- Number of Payouts: 63

Final Table
Place	Name	Prize
1st	(United States) Kevin Eyster	$1,587,382
2nd	(United States) Bill Jennings	$929,745
3rd	(United States) Ben Yu	$607,433
4th	(United States) Jake Schwartz	$412,187
5th	(United States) Cate Hall	$291,320
6th	(United States) Eddie Ochana	$226,238

=== Borgata Winter Poker Open ===
- Casino: Borgata Hotel & Casino, Atlantic City, New Jersey
- Buy-in: $3,500
- 6-Day Event: January 31-February 5, 2016
- Number of Entries: 1,171
- Total Prize Pool: $3,748,371
- Number of Payouts: 110

Final Table
Place	Name	Prize
1st	(United States) Chris Leong	$816,246
2nd	(United States) Rafael Yaraliyev	$487,288
3rd	(United States) Liam He	$297,995
4th	(United States) Joe McKeehen	$249,267
5th	(United States) Yevgeniy Timoshenko	$206,160
6th	(United States) Matthew Wantman	$166,803

=== Fallsview Poker Classic ===
- Casino: Fallsview Casino, Niagara Falls, Ontario
- Buy-in: $5,000
- 4-Day Event: February 21–24, 2016
- Number of Entries: 423
- Total Prize Pool: $1,907,544
- Number of Payouts: 54

Final Table
Place	Name	Prize (CAD)
1st	(Canada) David Ormsby	$383,407
2nd	(Canada) Robert Forbes	$268,773
3rd	(Canada) Derek Verrian	$172,823
4th	(Canada) Mike Bui	$127,805
5th	(Canada) Soren Turkewitsch	$95,949
6th	(Canada) Thomas Archer	$76,874

=== L.A. Poker Classic ===
- Casino: Commerce Casino, Commerce, California
- Buy-in: $10,000
- 6-Day Event: February 27-March 3, 2016
- Number of Entries: 515
- Total Prize Pool: $4,944,000
- Number of Payouts: 63

Final Table
Place	Name	Prize
1st	(Germany) Dietrich Fast	$1,000,800
2nd	(United States) Mike Shariati	$656,540
3rd	(United States) Alex Keating	$423,890
4th	(United States) Sam Soverel	$316,440
5th	(United States) Farid Jattin	$238,070
6th	(United States) Anthony Spinella	$191,250

=== Bay 101 Shooting Star ===
- Casino: Bay 101, San Jose, California
- Buy-in: $7,500
- 5-Day Event: March 7–11, 2016
- Number of Entries: 753
- Total Prize Pool: $5,138,800
- Number of Payouts: 72

Final Table
Place	Name	Prize
1st	(Germany) Stefan Schillhabel	$1,298,000
2nd	(United States) Adam Geyer	$752,800
3rd	(United States) Bryan Piccioli	$493,350
4th	(United States) Andjelko Andrejevic	$331,500
5th	(United States) Griffin Paul	$231,310
6th	(United States) Maria Ho	$179,930

=== WPT Rolling Thunder ===
- Casino: Thunder Valley Casino Resort, Lincoln, California
- Buy-in: $3,500
- 5-Day Event: March 12–16, 2016
- Number of Entries: 409
- Total Prize Pool: $1,308,800
- Number of Payouts: 46

Final Table
Place	Name	Prize
1st	(United States) Harrison Gimbel	$275,112
2nd	(United States) Mohsin Charania	$192,132
3rd	(United States) Russell Garrett	$123,682
4th	(United States) Markus Gonsalves	$91,616
5th	(United States) Hafiz Khan	$68,712
6th	(United States) Derek Wolters	$54,970

=== WPT Vienna ===
- Casino: Montesino Vienna, Vienna, Austria
- Buy-in: €3,300
- 6-Day Event: March 15–20, 2016
- Number of Entries: 234
- Total Prize Pool: €680,940
- Number of Payouts: 27

Final Table
Place	Name	Prize
1st	(Romania) Vlad Darie	€170,800
2nd	(Hungary) Zoltan Gal	€109,340
3rd	(United Kingdom) Matthew Davenport	€70,800
4th	(Germany) Dietrich Fast	€52,450
5th	(Austria) Dominik Bosnjak	€39,360
6th	(Greece) Georgios Zisimopoulos	€31,500

=== Seminole Hard Rock Poker Showdown ===
- Casino: Seminole Hard Rock Hotel & Casino, Hollywood, Florida
- Buy-in: $3,500
- 7-Day Event: April 14–20, 2016
- Number of Entries: 1,222
- Total Prize Pool: $3,910,400
- Number of Payouts: 153

Final Table
Place	Name	Prize
1st	(United States) Justin Young	$669,161
2nd	(United States) Garrett Greer	$458,722
3rd	(United States) Hyoung Chae	$297,336
4th	(United States) Matthew Haugen	$220,207
5th	(United States) Tim Reilly	$164,113
6th	(Canada) Ben Tarzia	$132,560

=== Seminole Hard Rock Poker Finale ===
- Casino: Seminole Hard Rock Hotel & Casino, Hollywood, Florida
- Buy-in: $10,000
- 5-Day Event: April 17–21, 2016
- Number of Entries: 342
- Total Prize Pool: $3,249,000
- Number of Payouts: 43

Final Table
Place	Name	Prize
1st	(United States) David Rheem	$705,885
2nd	(United States) Aditya Prasetyo	$484,130
3rd	(United States) Richard Leger	$311,305
4th	(Spain) Adrian Mateos	$200,510
5th	(United States) William Benson	$154,585
6th	(United States) Bryan Piccioli	$127,905

=== WPT Tournament of Champions ===
- Casino: Seminole Hard Rock Hotel & Casino, Hollywood, Florida
- Buy-in: $15,400 (Only past WPT champions could enter, with Season XIV winners receiving free entry)
- 3-Day Event: April 22–24, 2016
- Number of Entries: 64
- Total Prize Pool: $1,060,000
- Number of Payouts: 8

Final Table
Place	Name	Prize
1st	(Morocco) Farid Yachou	$381,600
2nd	(Romania) Vlad Darie	$224,190
3rd	(United States) Michael Mizrachi	$140,450
4th	(United States) Jonathan Jaffe	$95,400
5th	(United States) Noah Schwartz	$74,200
6th	(United States) Darren Elias	$58,300
