= 2013 World Series of Poker Europe results =

Poker tournament series results

Below are the results for the 2013 World Series of Poker Europe.

== Key ==
*	Elected to the Poker Hall of Fame
(#/#)	This denotes a bracelet winner. The first number is the number of bracelets won in 2013. The second number is the total number of bracelets won. Both numbers represent totals as of that point during the tournament.
Place	What place each player finished
Name	The player who made it to the final table
Prize (€)	The amount of money, in Euros (€), awarded for each finish at the event's final table

== Results ==
=== Event 1: €1,100 Ladies No Limit Hold'em ===
- 2-Day Event: 11–12 October
- Number of buy-ins: 65
- Total Prize Pool: €62,400
- Number of Payouts: 7
- Winning Hand: J♥ J♣

Final Table
Place	Name	Prize
1st	Jackie Glazier (1/1)	€21,850
2nd	Maryline Valente	€13,500
3rd	Laurie Bismuth	€8,950
4th	Celine Bastian	€6,330
5th	Nathalie Odet	€4,770
6th	Sherrill Lindsay	€3,800
7th	Gaelle Baumann	€3,200

=== Event 2: €1,100 No Limit Hold'em Re-Entry ===
- 4-Day Event: 12–15 October
- Number of buy-ins: 659
- Total Prize Pool: €632,640
- Number of Payouts: 72
- Winning Hand: 10♥ 9♠

Final Table
Place	Name	Prize
1st	Henrik Johansson (1/1)	€129,700
2nd	Adriano Torre-Grossa	€80,250
3rd	Yaniv Botbol	€58,860
4th	Daniel Weinman	€43,772
5th	Serge Ekert	€32,992
6th	Daniel Laidlaw	€25,190
7th	Jose Obadia	€19,498
8th	Jean-Philippe Tuffery	€15,285
9th	Andrei Konopelko	€12,134

=== Event 3: €5,300 Mixed Max No Limit Hold'em ===
- 4-Day Event: 14–17 October
- Number of buy-ins: 140
- Total Prize Pool: €672,000
- Number of Payouts: 16
- Winning Hand: 7♥ 7♣

Final Table
Place	Name	Prize
1st	Darko Stojanovic (1/1)	€188,160
2nd	Dan O'Brien	€116,280
SF	Jason Mann	€62,770
SF	Noah Schwartz	€62,770
5th	Shannon Shorr	€30,695
6th	Jeremy Joseph	€30,695
7th	Jake Schwartz	€30,695
8th	Joe Kuether	€30,695

=== Event 4: €1,650 Pot Limit Omaha ===
- 3-Day Event: 15–17 October
- Number of buy-ins: 184
- Total Prize Pool: €270,480
- Number of Payouts: 21
- Winning Hand: A♥ Q♥ 10♦ 8♥

Final Table
Place	Name	Prize
1st	Jeremy Ausmus (1/1)	€70,324
2nd	Juha Helppi	€43,441
3rd	Jan-Peter Jachtmann (0/1)	€31,367
4th	Jason Mercier (0/2)	€23,036
5th	Martin Kozlov	€17,210
6th	Michael Schwartz	€13,077
7th	Jonathan Little	€10,102
8th	Yohann Aube	€7,933
9th	Ryan Chapman	€6,335

=== Event 5: €2,200 No Limit Hold'em ===
- 3-Day Event: 16–18 October
- Number of buy-ins: 337
- Total Prize Pool: €647,040
- Number of Payouts: 36
- Winning Hand: K♠ K♦

Final Table
Place	Name	Prize
1st	Roger Hairabedian (1/2)	€148,820
2nd	Erik Seidel (0/8)	€92,003
3rd	Kevin Song (0/1)	€67,118
4th	Matan Kraków	€49,784
5th	Erwann Pecheux	€37,052
6th	Mike Watson	€28,683
7th	Max Greenwood (0/1)	€22,258
8th	Ariel Silveira	€17,521
9th	Arnaud Peyroles	€13,989

=== Event 6: €3,250 Mixed Max Pot Limit Omaha ===
- 3-Day Event: 17–19 October
- Number of buy-ins: 127
- Total Prize Pool: €373,380
- Number of Payouts: 16
- Winning Hand: K♠ A♣ 8♥ 7♦

Final Table
Place	Name	Prize
1st	Noah Schwartz (1/1)	€104,580
2nd	Ludovic Lacay	€64,600
SF	Vitaly Lunkin (0/2)	€34,500
SF	Jyri Merivirta	€34,500
5th	Jeremy Joseph	€21,000
6th	Aku Joentausta	€21,000

=== Event 7: €10,450 No Limit Hold'em Main Event ===
- 7-Day Event: 19–25 October
- Number of buy-ins: 375
- Total Prize Pool: €3,600,000
- Number of Payouts: 40
- Winning Hand: A♠ K♣

Final Table
Place	Name	Prize
1st	Adrián Mateos (1/1)	€1,000,000
2nd	Fabrice Soulier (0/1)	€610,000
3rd	Dominik Nitsche (0/1)	€400,000
4th	Jerome Huge	€251,000
5th	Ravi Raghavan	€176,000
6th	Benny Spindler	€126,000
7th	Andrei Konopelko	€101,000
8th	Shannon Shorr	€77,500

=== Event 8: €25,600 High Roller No Limit Hold'em ===
- 3-Day Event: 22–24 October
- Number of buy-ins: 80
- Total Prize Pool: €1,920,000
- Number of Payouts: 9
- Winning Hand: J♦ J♠

Final Table
Place	Name	Prize
1st	Daniel Negreanu (2/6)	€725,000
2nd	Nicolau Villa-Lobos	€450,000
3rd	Philipp Gruissem	€250,000
4th	David Peters	€150,500
5th	Timothy Adams (0/1)	€100,600
6th	Scott Seiver (0/1)	€74,600
7th	Jason Koon	€63,500
8th	Erik Seidel (0/8)	€55,400
