= World Poker Tour season 19 results =

Below are the results for season 19 (2021) of the World Poker Tour. There are ten scheduled events, including three online events to be held on partypoker. Two events were cancelled during the season; WPT bestbet Scramble and WPT Maryland at Live! Casino.

== Events ==
=== WPT Online Series ===
- Casino: Online (partypoker)
- Buy-in: $3,200
- 6-Day Event: May 23-June 2, 2021
- Number of Entries: 1,065
- Total Prize Pool: $3,195,000
- Number of Payouts: 158

Final Table
| Place | Name | Prize |
|---|---|---|
| 1st | (Germany) Christian Rudolph | $487,443 |
| 2nd | (Brazil) Fabiano Kovalski | $401,793 |
| 3rd | (Canada) Daniel Dvoress | $249,324 |
| 4th | (Germany) Marc Lange | $163,003 |
| 5th | (Brazil) Luciano Hollanda | $111,783 |
| 6th | (Brazil) Yuri Dzivielevski | $86,399 |

=== Seminole Hard Rock Tampa ===
- Casino: Seminole Hard Rock Hotel and Casino, Tampa, Florida
- Buy-in: $3,500
- 5-Day Event: June 18–22, 2021
- Number of Entries: 1,165
- Total Prize Pool: $3,728,000
- Number of Payouts: 146

Final Table
| Place | Name | Prize |
|---|---|---|
| 1st | (United States) Brian Altman | $613,225 |
| 2nd | (United States) Gabriel Abusada | $408,825 |
| 3rd | (United States) Zachary Smiley | $302,200 |
| 4th | (United States) Jonathan Jaffe | $225,675 |
| 5th | (United States) John Haas | $170,275 |
| 6th | (United States) Will Berry | $129,825 |

=== WPT Venetian ===
- Casino: The Venetian, Las Vegas, Nevada
- Buy-in: $5,000
- 6-Day Event: July 2–7, 2021
- Number of Entries: 1,199
- Total Prize Pool: $5,545,375
- Number of Payouts: 150
- Note: Three women made the final table for the first time in WPT history

Final Table
| Place | Name | Prize |
|---|---|---|
| 1st | (United States) Chad Eveslage | $910,370 |
| 2nd | (United States) Mike Liang | $606,890 |
| 3rd | (United States) Kyna England | $448,755 |
| 4th | (United States) Tim McDermott | $335,200 |
| 5th | (Colombia) Daniela Rodriguez | $252,945 |
| 6th | (Taiwan) Kitty Kuo | $192,855 |

=== WPT Choctaw ===
- Casino: Choctaw Casino & Resort, Durant, Oklahoma
- Buy-in: $3,700
- 5-Day Event: July 23–27, 2021
- Number of Entries: 964
- Total Prize Pool: 3,272,780
- Number of Payouts: 122

Final Table
| Place | Name | Prize |
|---|---|---|
| 1st | (United States) Dapo Ajayi | $558,610 |
| 2nd | (United States) Viet Vo | $372,415 |
| 3rd | (United States) Albert Calderon | $275,085 |
| 4th | (United States) Hunter Cichy | $205,330 |
| 5th | (United States) Will Nguyen | $154,885 |
| 6th | (United States) Michael Perrone | $118,090 |

=== WPT World Online Championships ===
- Casino: Online (partypoker)
- Buy-in: $5,300
- 3-Day Event: August 29 - September 14, 2022
- Number of Entries: 1,179
- Total Prize Pool: $5,895,000
- Number of Payouts: 178

Final Table
| Place | Name | Prize |
|---|---|---|
| 1st | (Slovenia) Rok Gostisa | $959,493 |
| 2nd | (United States) David Peters | $660,482 |
| 3rd | (Romania) Vlad Darie | $453,677 |
| 4th | (Brazil) Bruno Volkmann | $296,185 |
| 5th | (Austria) Philipp Hofbauer | $202,734 |
| 6th | (England) Talal Shakerchi | $156,421 |

=== WPT Online Borgata Poker Open ===
- Casino: Online (partypoker US Network)
- Buy-in: $3,500
- 5-Day Event: September 19–21, 2021
- Number of Entries: 305
- Total Prize Pool: $1,000,000
- Number of Payouts: 48
- Note: Online screen names are in the place where real names are not available to the public

Final Table
| Place | Name | Prize |
|---|---|---|
| 1st | (United States) Orson Young | $195,748 |
| 2nd | "justliberto" | $135,930 |
| 3rd | (United States) Daniel Buzgon | $102,933 |
| 4th | "FitzroidPoo" | $76,830 |
| 5th | "betbetbet" | $61,070 |
| 6th | "CNC_LY" | $47,280 |

=== Seminole Rock 'N' Roll Poker Open ===
- Casino: Seminole Hard Rock Hotel & Casino, Hollywood, Florida
- Buy-in: $3,500
- 5-Day Event: November 26–30, 2021
- Number of Entries: 1,566
- Total Prize Pool: $5,011,200
- Number of Payouts: 196

Final Table
| Place | Name | Prize |
|---|---|---|
| 1st | (Lithuania) Gediminas Uselis | $778,490 |
| 2nd | (United States) Jacob Ferro | $573,605 |
| 3rd | (Canada) Harout Ghazarian | $380,000 |
| 4th | (Turkey) Selahaddin Bedir | $282,380 |
| 5th | (United States) Clayton Maguire | $211,925 |
| 6th | (United States) Anshul Rai | $170,835 |

=== Five Diamond World Poker Classic ===
- Casino: Bellagio Resort & Casino, Las Vegas, Nevada
- Buy-in: $10,400
- 5-Day Event: December 15–19, 2021
- Number of Entries: 716
- Total Prize Pool: $6,945,200
- Number of Payouts: 90
- Note: This was the second time Mohsin Charania reached the Five Diamond World Poker Classic final table (1st in Season 13)

Final Table
| Place | Name | Prize |
|---|---|---|
| 1st | (United States) Taylor Black | $1,241,430 |
| 2nd | (United States) Vikenty Shegal | $827,620 |
| 3rd | (Italy) Gianluca Speranza | $609,960 |
| 4th | (France) Lorenzo Lavis | $454,590 |
| 5th | (United States) Mohsin Charania | $342,645 |
| 6th | (South Korea) David Kim | $261,235 |
