= Gregory Brooks =

American poker player and entrepreneur

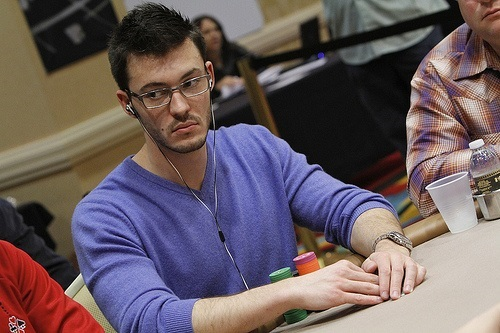
- Education: Wake Forest University
- Occupation: Entrepreneur
- Known for: Professional Poker Player; Entrepreneur
- Awards: 1st Place, 2011 World Poker Tour L.A. Poker Classic

Poker Stats

World Series of Poker
- Bracelet: None
- Money finishes: 3
- Highest WSOP Main Event finish: 7th, 2011

World Poker Tour
- Title: 1
- Final table: 1
- Money finish: 1

European Poker Tour
- Title: 1
- Final table: 1
- Money finishes: 2

Gregory Brooks is an entrepreneur and former professional poker player. He began his poker career as an online player on sites such as PokerStars and then moved to no limit tournaments where he won the 2011 World Poker Tour L.A. Poker Classic, defeating Vivek Rajkumar for a prize of $1,654,120. Brooks is the co-founder of Skorb, a venture that he began with his brother in 2011. He is also the founder of LeggoPoker, a community-based website for teaching poker strategy through videos and one-on-one training. The company was purchased by Phil Ivey's IveyPoker in 2013. Brooks also founded the website Textbook Assault which aggregates pricing of textbooks from multiple websites such as Amazon.com, Chegg.com, Barnes and Noble, and eCampus.com.

== Poker career ==
Brooks began his poker career at Party Poker, playing cash games while he was still attending Wake Forest University. As a freshman, he earned $25,000 over the summer of 2006 playing $1/$2 no limit hold'em and began to rise through the ranks of the online poker world. By the fall of 2007, Brooks was playing the largest stakes offered on PokerStars, and in the summer of 2008 released a montage video featuring various hands at stakes up to $50/$100 no limit hold'em. In the spring of 2011, Brooks began playing high-stakes poker in no-limit hold 'em tournaments. In addition to his earnings in no limit tournaments, Brooks is still active in online high-stakes poker tournaments.

Brooks' biggest victory came at the World Poker Tour 2011 L.A. Poker Classic where he took 1st place and a purse of $1,654,120.

=== Prize events ===
Date	Country	Series/Tournament	Place	Prize
June 20, 2011	USA	World Series of Poker	7th	$53,210
June 11, 2011	USA	World Series of Poker	93rd	$5,071
May 11, 2011	Spain	European Poker Tour	1st	€136,000 ($201,855)
February 25, 2011	USA	World Poker Tour	1st	$1,654,120
June 14, 2010	USA	World Series of Poker	103rd	$5,211
January 28, 2010	USA	Borgata Winter Open	6th	$6,208
January 10, 2010	Bahamas	PokerStars Caribbean Adventure	2nd	$12,000
September 30, 2009	United Kingdom	European Poker Tour	11th	€3,200 ($5,094)

== Business ventures ==
Brooks co-founded LeggoPoker, an online community that offers one-on-one training and instructional videos for poker players. The company was founded by Brooks and Chris Tickner and offers training from professional poker players such as Brooks, Andrew Lichtenberger, Aaron Jones, and Ben Sulsky (Sauce123). The company was purchased by Phil Ivey in 2013 as an addition to his Ivey League and currently operates as a division of IveyPoker.

In 2011, Brooks co-founded Skorb, an online portal that provides ways for college students to spend less on the things they buy. The website is only open to students and leverages discounts offered through partners such as percentage savings at sites like Apple, Microsoft, Best Buy, and Groupon. The site also allows students to earn money by involving parents and other supporting individuals.

Brooks also co-founded the online metasearch engine Textbook Assault. The website compares textbook prices from multiple sources such as Amazon.com, Bookbyte, Biblio.com, and ECampus.com. The result of each search displays the website a book can be found and the price that it is selling for on that site, but also allows users to check out directly from the Textbook Assault site.

== See also ==
- Poker tournament
- World Series of Poker
- World Poker Tour season 9 results
