= 2013 World Series of Poker Europe =

Series of poker tournaments

The seventh World Series of Poker Europe (WSOPE) took place from October 11, 2013 to October 25, 2013, at Casino Barriere in Enghien-les-Bains, France. There were eight bracelet events.

== Event schedule ==
#	Event	Entrants	Winner	Prize	Runner-up	Results	Reference
1	€1,100 Ladies No-Limit Hold'em	65	Jackie Glazier (1/1)	€21,850	Maryline Valente	Results	
2	€1,100 No-Limit Hold’em Re-Entry	659	Henrik Johansson (1/1)	€129,700	Adriano Torre-Grossa	Results	
3	€5,300 Mixed-Max No-Limit Hold’em	140	Darko Stojanovic (1/1)	€188,160	Dan O'Brien	Results	
4	€1,650 Pot Limit Omaha	184	Jeremy Ausmus (1/1)	€70,324	Juha Helppi	Results	
5	€2,200 No Limit Hold’em	337	Roger Hairabedian (1/2)	€148,820	Erik Seidel (0/8)	Results	
6	€3,250 Mixed-Max Pot-Limit Omaha	127	Noah Schwartz (1/1)	€104,580	Ludovic Lacay	Results	
7	€10,450 Main Event – No-Limit Hold’em	375	Adrián Mateos (1/1)	€1,000,000	Fabrice Soulier (0/1)	Results	
8	€25,600 High Roller No-Limit Hold’em	80	Daniel Negreanu (2/6)	€725,000	Nicolau Villa-Lobos	Results	

== Main Event ==
The 2013 World Series of Poker Europe Main Event began on October 19 and finished October 25. The event drew 375 entrants, generating a prize pool of €3,600,000. The top 40 players finished in the money, with the winner earning €1,000,000.

=== Final table ===
Name	Number of chips (percentage of total)	WSOP Bracelets	WSOP Cashes*	WSOP Earnings*
(Spain) Adrian Mateos	3,781,000 (33.5%)	0	0	0
(Germany) Dominik Nitsche	2,354,000 (20.9%)	1	15	$754,395
(France) Fabrice Soulier	1,871,000 (16.6%)	1	22	$1,180,219
(Germany) Benny Spindler	1,748,000 (15.5%)	0	4	$197,905
(United States) Ravi Raghavan	898,000 (8.0%)	0	13	$206,674
(France) Jerome Huge	637,000 (5.6%)	0	0	0

*-Career statistics prior to start of 2013 WSOPE Main Event

=== Final table results ===
Place	Name	Prize
1st	Adrian Mateos (1/1)	€1,000,000
2nd	Fabrice Soulier (0/1)	€610,000
3rd	Dominik Nitsche (0/1)	€400,000
4th	Jerome Huge	€251,000
5th	Ravi Raghavan	€176,000
6th	Benny Spindler	€126,000
7th	Andrei Konopelko	€101,000
8th	Shannon Shorr	€77,500
