= Rob Akery =

English poker player (born 1986)

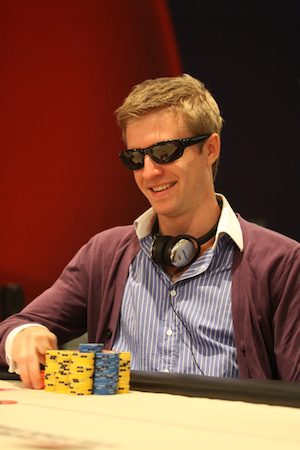
- Nickname: Vaga_Lion
- Born: 15 March 1986 (age 40)

World Poker Tour
- Final table: 1
- Money finish: $169,930

European Poker Tour
- Final tables: 3
- Money finish: $423,258

Rob Akery (also known as Vaga_Lion) is an English professional poker player from Bristol. He has more than US$1.29 million in recorded live tournament cashes, including third place in the £20,000 High Roller at the 2011 EPT London festival.

== Career ==
Akery started playing poker in 2004 and went professional in 2005. Rob started playing poker at the age of 18 after receiving a $5 transfer into his account from a friend. At 21, Akery played his first World Series of Poker Main Event. As of 2011, Akery was reported to have accumulated total live tournament winnings of $1,256,194.

== Online poker ==
Akery won the PokerStars Sunday Million on 4 June 2008 for $177,816 following a heads-up deal, and he captured a PokerStars Super Tuesday title in January 2017.

== Age of Mythology ==
Akery was previously one of the top players of Age of Mythology and was at one stage ranked as the world's top player.

== Tournaments Overview ==
Date	Event	Place	Prize
Nov 2007	GBPT Grand Final	2nd	$99,828
Jan 2008	Crown Aussie Millions Championship	9th	$184,036
June 2008	Online Pokerstars Sunday Million	1st	$177,816
Dec 2008	Grand Final - Great British Poker Tour	2nd	$103,236
Sept 2009	London Open PokerStars EPT - Season 6	4th	$26,222
Jul 2010	Bellagio Cup VI/ WPT Season 9	5th	$169,930
May 2011	PokerStars EPT Madrid - Season 7	2nd	$129,752
Oct 2011	Pokerstars EPT London / Season 8 / UKIPT /Season 2	3rd	$359,121
