= World Poker Tour season 11 results =

Results of the World Poker Tour Season XI

Below are the results for season 11 (XI) of the World Poker Tour. These events happened between August 4, 2012, and May 24, 2013.

== Results ==
=== Merit Cyprus Classic ===
- Casino: Merit Crystal Cove Hotel and Casino, Alsancak Mevkii Kyrenia, Cyprus
- Buy-in: $4,000 + $400
- 6-Day Event: August 4–9, 2012
- Number of Entries: 329
- Total Prize Pool: $1,212,694
- Number of Payouts: 36
- Winning Hand: J♦ 9♦

Final Table
Place	Name	Prize
1st	(Germany) Marvin Rettenmaier	$287,784
2nd	(Russia) Artur Voskanyan	$184,020
3rd	(Israel) Ran Azor	$118,360
4th	(Romania) Victor Parashiv	$87,610
5th	(Lebanon) Joseph El Khoury	$65,770
6th	(Belarus) Kiryl Radzivonau	$52,590

=== Parx Open Poker Classic ===
- Casino: Parx Casino, Bensalem, Pennsylvania
- Buy-in: $3,300 + $200
- 6-Day Event: August 10–15, 2012
- Number of Entries: 500
- Total Prize Pool: $1,600,500
- Number of Payouts: 54
- Winning Hand: K♥ 9♦

Final Table
Place	Name	Prize
1st	(United States) Anthony Gregg	$416,127
2nd	(United States) Stephen Reynolds	$244,877
3rd	(United States) Chris Lee	$158,450
4th	(United States) Larry Sharp	$108,034
5th	(United States) Chris Vandeursen	$76,824
6th	(United States) Andre Nyffeler	$61,619

=== Legends of Poker ===
- Casino: The Bicycle Casino, Bell Gardens, California
- Buy-in: $3,500 + $200
- 6-Day Event: August 24–29, 2012
- Number of Entries: 622
- Total Prize Pool: $2,111,690
- Number of Payouts: 63
- Winning Hand: J♥ J♠

Final Table
Place	Name	Prize
1st	(United States) Josh Hale	$500,000
2nd	(United States) Max Steinberg	$293,490
3rd	(United States) Raouf Malek	$192,400
4th	(United States) Ali Eslami	$133,700
5th	(Canada) Greg Mueller	$97,100
6th	(United States) Jeff Madsen	$75,400

=== Grand Prix de Paris ===
- Casino: Aviation Club de France, Paris, France
- Buy-in: €7,500
- 6-Day Event: Sep 10–15, 2012
- Number of Entries: 228
- Total Prize Pool: €1,624,500
- Number of Payouts: 27
- Winning Hand: Q♠ Q♣

Final Table
Place	Name	Prize
1st	(Canada) Matthew Salsberg	€400,000
2nd	(Denmark) Theo Jørgensen	€264,600
3rd	(Germany) Philipp Gruissem	€170,065
4th	(Canada) Timothy Adams	€125,775
5th	(United States) Mohsin Charania	€95,615
6th	(Germany) Fabian Quoss	€75,765

=== WPT Malta ===
- Casino: Casino at Portomaso, Portomaso
- Buy-in: €3,000 + €300
- 5-Day Event: Sep 16–20, 2012
- Number of Entries: 169
- Total Prize Pool: €643,641
- Number of Payouts: 21
- Winning Hand: A♠ 3♣

Final Table
Place	Name	Prize
1st	(France) Yorane Kerignard	€120,000
2nd	(Italy) Jackson Genovesi	€82,370
3rd	(Italy) Alessio Isaia	€52,600
4th	(Taiwan) Hui Chen-Kuo	€39,200
5th	(Montenegro) Zeljko Krizan	€29,300
6th	(Finland) Sampo Ryynanen	€23,300

=== Borgata Poker Open ===
- Casino: Borgata Hotel Casino, Atlantic City, New Jersey
- Buy-in: $3,300 + $200
- 6-Day Event: Sep 16–21, 2012
- Number of Entries: 1,181
- Total Prize Pool: $3,897,300
- Number of Payouts: 110
- Winning Hand: K♣ Q♥

Final Table
Place	Name	Prize
1st	(United States) Ben Hamnett	$818,847
2nd	(United States) Matthew Burnitz	$488,850
3rd	(United States) Tyler Patterson	$298,950
4th	(United States) Ofir Mor	$250,065
5th	(United States) Steve Brecher	$206,821
6th	(United States) David Diaz	$167,337

=== WPT Emperors Palace Poker Classic ===
- Casino: Emperors Palace Hotel Casino Convention Entertainment Resort, Johannesburg
- Buy-in: $3,300 + $300
- 5-Day Event: Oct 22–26, 2012
- Number of Entries: 230
- Total Prize Pool: $759,000
- Number of Payouts: 27
- Winning Hand: A♣ 4♣

Final Table
Place	Name	Prize
1st	(Germany) Dominik Nitsche	$206,153
2nd	(England) Jerome Bradpiece	$121,477
3rd	(Estonia) Ross William	$80,985
4th	(South Africa) Wesley Wiegand	$56,321
5th	(South Africa) Jason Strauss	$41,965
6th	(South Africa) Andrew Anthony	$32,394

=== bestbet Jacksonville Fall Poker Scramble ===
- Casino: BestBet Jacksonville, Jacksonville, Florida
- Buy-in: $3,200 + $300
- 5-Day Event: Nov 9–13, 2012
- Number of Entries: 477
- Total Prize Pool: $1,526,400
- Number of Payouts: 45
- Winning Hand: Q♠ 10♠

Final Table
Place	Name	Prize
1st	(United States) Noah Schwartz	$402,972
2nd	(United States) Byron Kaverman	$236,592
3rd	(United States) Ryan Hartmann	$153,403
4th	(United States) Hans Winzeler	$106,848
5th	(United States) Brian Senie	$77,083
6th	(United States) Lee Markholt	$61,819

=== WPT Copenhagen ===
- Casino: Casino Copenhagen, Copenhagen, Denmark
- Buy-in: DKr 24,000 + 2,250
- 6-Day Event: Nov 12–17, 2012
- Number of Entries: 229
- Total Prize Pool: DKr 5,496,000
- Number of Payouts: 27
- Winning Hand: K♦ K♣

Final Table
Place	Name	Prize
1st	(Sweden) Emil Olsson	DKr 1,346,000
2nd	(Norway) Morten Klein	DKr 845,000
3rd	(Denmark) Philip Jacobsen	DKr 545,000
4th	(United States) Stanislav Barshak	DKr 400,000
5th	(Sweden) Robin Christoffer Ylitalo	DKr 300,000
6th	(Denmark) Jan Djerberg	DKr 240,000

=== WPT Montréal ===
- Casino: Playground Poker Club, Kahnawake, Canada
- Buy-in: $3,000 + $300
- 5-Day Event: Nov 23–27, 2012
- Number of Entries: 1,173
- Total Prize Pool: $3,387,930
- Number of Payouts: 117
- Winning Hand: K♠ J♥

Final Table
Place	Name	Prize
1st	(Canada) Jonathan Roy	$784,101
2nd	(Canada) Pascal Lefrançois	$473,572
3rd	(United States) Jeff Gross	$319,238
4th	(Canada) Gavin Smith	$212,937
5th	(Canada) Sylvain Siebert	$147,184
6th	(United States) Peter Kaemmerlen	$113,792

=== WPT Mazagan ===
- Casino: Mazagan Beach and Golf Resort, El Jadida, Morocco
- Buy-in: €3,200 + €300
- 5-Day Event: Nov 27 – Dec 1, 2012
- Number of Entries: 146
- Total Prize Pool: €438,253
- Number of Payouts: 18
- Winning Hand: A♣ 3♥

Final Table
Place	Name	Prize
1st	(Italy) Giacomo Fundaro	€127,707
2nd	(France) Frederic Brunet	€75,225
3rd	(France) Jeremy Nock	€48,673
4th	(Belgium) Davidi Kitai	€35,928
5th	(France) Clement Beauvois	€26,990
6th	(France) Bruno Fitoussi	€21,681

=== WPT Prague ===
- Casino: Corinthia Casino, Prague, Czech Republic
- Buy-in: €3,000 + €300
- 7-Day Event: Dec 3–9, 2012
- Number of Entries: 567
- Total Prize Pool: €1,684,295
- Number of Payouts: 72
- Winning Hand: 7♣ 7♦

Final Table
Place	Name	Prize
1st	(Poland) Marcin Wydrowski	€325,000
2nd	(Russia) Alexander Lahkov	€213,775
3rd	(Germany) Bodo Sbrzesny	€137,470
4th	(China) Tony Chang	€101,800
5th	(United States) Michael Gagliano	€76,315
6th	(Romania) Alin Grasu	€61,150

=== Doyle Brunson Five Diamond World Poker Classic ===
- Casino: Bellagio, Las Vegas
- Buy-in: $10,000 + $300
- 6-Day Event: Dec 4–9, 2012
- Number of Entries: 503
- Total Prize Pool: $4,879,100
- Number of Payouts: 54
- Winning Hand: 7♣ 7♥

Final Table
Place	Name	Prize
1st	(United States) Ravi Raghavan	$1,268,571
2nd	(Canada) Shawn Buchanan	$746,502
3rd	(United States) Thomas Winters	$483,031
4th	(United States) Antonio Esfandiari	$329,339
5th	(United States) Andrew Lichtenberger	$234,197
6th	(United States) Jeremy Kottler	$187,845

=== Borgata Winter Poker Open ===
- Casino: Borgata Hotel Casino, Atlantic City, New Jersey
- Buy-in: $3,300 + $200
- 6-Day Event: Jan 27 – Feb 1, 2013
- Number of Entries: 1,042
- Total Prize Pool: $3,335,442
- Number of Payouts: 100
- Winning Hand: A♠ 6♠

Final Table
Place	Name	Prize
1st	(United States) Andy Hwang	$730,053
2nd	(United States) Jim Anderson	$438,698
3rd	(United States) Mike Gogliormella	$265,475
4th	(United States) Matt Haugen	$222,336
5th	(United States) Jeremy Druckman	$182,514
6th	(Canada) Matthew Salsberg	$147,671

=== WPT Lucky Hearts Poker Open ===
- Casino: Seminole Hard Rock Hotel and Casino, Hollywood, Florida
- Buy-in: $3,250 + $250
- 5-Day Event: Feb 8–12, 2013
- Number of Entries: 369
- Total Prize Pool: $1,199,250
- Number of Payouts: 36
- Winning Hand: 8♣ 8♥

Final Table
Place	Name	Prize
1st	(United States) Matt Giannetti	$323,804
2nd	(United States) Lily Kiletto	$191,880
3rd	(United States) Darryll Fish	$125,921
4th	(United States) Danny Shiff	$86,946
5th	(United States) Hayden Fortini	$64,160
6th	(Canada) Matthew Salsberg	$50,968

=== WPT Baden ===
- Casino: Casino Baden, Baden, Austria
- Buy-in: €3,300
- 6-Day Event: Feb 19–24, 2013
- Number of Entries: 254
- Total Prize Pool: €1,031,142
- Number of Payouts: 27
- Winning Hand: A♠ 9♠

Final Table
Place	Name	Prize
1st	(Serbia) Vladimir Bozinovic	€271,258
2nd	(Netherlands) Paul Berende	€172,695
3rd	(Austria) Oswin Zieglebecker	€111,587
4th	(Finland) Kimmo Kurko	€81,034
5th	(Germany) Marvin Rettenmaier	€59,496
6th	(Poland) Grzegorz Wyraz	€47,820

=== L.A. Poker Classic ===
- Casino: Commerce Casino, Commerce, California
- Buy-in: $10,000
- 6-Day Event: Feb 23–28, 2013
- Number of Entries: 517
- Total Prize Pool: $4,963,200
- Number of Payouts: 63
- Winning Hand: Q♥ 5♥

Final Table
Place	Name	Prize
1st	(Canada) Paul Klann	$1,004,090
2nd	(United States) Paul Volpe	$651,170
3rd	(United States) Jesse Yaginuma	$429,810
4th	(United States) Danny Fuhs	$316,650
5th	(United States) David Fong	$236,250
6th	(England) Toby Lewis	$193,560

=== Bay 101 Shooting Star ===
- Casino: Bay 101, San Jose, California
- Buy-in: $7,500
- 5-Day Event: March 4–8, 2013
- Number of Entries: 643
- Total Prize Pool: $4,597,450
- Number of Payouts: 63
- Winning Hand: 8♠ 6♦

Final Table
Place	Name	Prize
1st	(United States) WeiKai Chang	$1,138,350
2nd	(United States) Joe Nguyen	$666,740
3rd	(United States) Paul Volpe	$435,610
4th	(United States) Erik Seidel	$295,590
5th	(United States) Chris Johnson	$208,910
6th	(United States) Joe Kuether	$162,240

=== WPT Venice Grand Prix ===
- Casino: Casino di Venezia, Venice, Italy
- Buy-in: €3,000 + €300
- 6-Day Event: March 25–30, 2013
- Number of Entries: 173
- Total Prize Pool: €519,000
- Number of Payouts: 21
- Winning Hand: J♣ 8♠

Final Table
Place	Name	Prize
1st	(Italy) Rocco Palumbo	€180,097
2nd	(Italy) Marcello Montagner	€108,316
3rd	(United States) Mike Sexton	€69,723
4th	(Switzerland) Roberto Begni	€51,585
5th	(Italy) Xia Lin	€38,721
6th	(Italy) Erion Islamay	€31,002

=== WPT Barcelona ===
- Casino: Casino Barcelona, Barcelona, Spain
- Buy-in: €3,200 + €300
- 6-Day Event: April 5–10, 2013
- Number of Entries: 249
- Total Prize Pool: €796,800
- Number of Payouts: 27
- Winning Hand: 8♣ 8♥

Final Table
Place	Name	Prize
1st	(Canada) Chanracy Khun	€200,000
2nd	(France) Benjamin Pollak	€126,000
3rd	(Portugal) Antonio Alfaia	€83,000
4th	(Morocco) Tahiri Hassani Najib	€62,000
5th	(Spain) Bruno Garcia Cotelo	€46,000
6th	(Spain) Sergio Fernandez	€37,000

=== Seminole Hard Rock Showdown ===
- Casino: Seminole Hard Rock Hotel and Casino Hollywood, Hollywood, Florida
- Buy-in: $5,000
- 6-Day Event: April 11–16, 2013
- Number of Entries: 542
- Total Prize Pool: $2,547,000
- Number of Payouts: 54
- Winning Hand: A♣ 10♣

Final Table
Place	Name	Prize
1st	(United States) Kevin Eyster	$660,395
2nd	(Canada) Ben Tarzia	$389,750
3rd	(United States) Zo Karim	$252,190
4th	(United States) Paul Dlugozima	$171,950
5th	(United States) Daniel Letts	$122,275
6th	(United States) Jeff Madsen	$100,000

=== bestbet Open ===
- Casino: bestbet Jacksonville, Jacksonville, Florida
- Buy-in: $3,500
- 5-Day Event: April 26–30, 2013
- Number of Entries: 351
- Total Prize Pool: $1,123,204
- Number of Payouts: 36
- Winning Hand: A♥ Q♦

Final Table
Place	Name	Prize
1st	(United States) Mike Linster	$321,521
2nd	(United States) David Bell	$175,712
3rd	(United States) Danny Schechter	$115,311
4th	(United States) Pete Chwala	$79,619
5th	(United States) Pete Tinnesz	$58,754
6th	(United States) David Diaz	$46,673

=== Canadian Spring Championship ===
- Casino: Playground Poker Club, Kahnawake, Quebec
- Buy-in: $3,300
- 7-Day Event: May 3–9, 2013
- Number of Entries: 735
- Total Prize Pool: $2,121,244
- Number of Payouts: 72
- Winning Hand: 8♣ 5♠

Final Table
Place	Name	Prize
1st	(Canada) Amir Babakhani	$442,248
2nd	(Canada) Barry Kruger	$272,555
3rd	(Canada) Jason Duval	$199,029
4th	(Canada) Bobby Liang	$136,700
5th	(Canada) Martin Leblanc	$102,251
6th	(Canada) Jonathan Bardier	$81,767

=== WPT World Championship ===
- Casino: Bellagio, Las Vegas
- Buy-in: $25,000
- 7-Day Event: May 18–24, 2013
- Number of Entries: 146
- Total Prize Pool: $3,540,500
- Number of Payouts: 15
- Winning Hand: K♦ 9♣

Final Table
Place	Name	Prize
1st	(United States) David Rheem	$1,150,297
2nd	(United States) Erick Lindgren	$650,275
3rd	(Canada) Jonathan Roy	$421,800
4th	(United States) Matt Hyman	$289,988
5th	(United States) Brandon Steven	$223,203
6th	(United States) David Peters	$173,993
