= World Poker Tour season 9 results =

Below are the results of season nine of the World Poker Tour (2010–2011)

== Results ==
=== WPT Grand Prix de Paris ===
- Casino: Aviation Club de France, Paris, France
- Buy-in: €10,000
- 5-Day Event: May 8 – 15, 2010
- Number of Entries: 247
- Total Prize Pool: €2,347,797
- Number of Payouts: 27
- Winning Hand: A♠ K♣

Final Table
Place	Name	Prize
1st	(Denmark) Theo Jørgensen	€633,902
2nd	(France) Antoine Amourette	€328,690
3rd	(Sweden) Per Linde	€234,780
4th	(France) Mickael Guenni	€187,825
5th	(France) Fabrice Touil	€140,870
6th	(France) Nourredine Aïtaleb	€93,910
7th	(France) Arnaud Mattern	€82,175
8th	(Sweden) Jimmy Ostensson	€70,435

=== WPT Spanish Championship ===
- Casino: Casino Barcelona, Barcelona, Spain
- Buy-in: €3,200 + €300
- 5-Day Event: May 19 – 23, 2010
- Number of Entries: 326
- Total Prize Pool: €1,034,400
- Number of Payouts: 36
- Winning Hand: Q♣ 5♣

Final Table
Place	Name	Prize
1st	(Germany) Ali Tekintamgac	€315,000
2nd	(Spain) Roberto Garcia Santiago	€160,000
3rd	(Sweden) Mats Erik Iremark	€81,000
4th	(Austria) Manuel Blaschke	€71,000
5th	(Denmark) Mads Smith Hansen	€61,000
6th	(France) Tristan Quentin Clemencon	€51,000
7th	(Sweden) Per Emil Mattson	€41,000
8th	(Spain) Bartolome Gomila Romero	€31,000
9th	(Spain) Manuel Cuberos Lopez Cozar	€21,400

=== Bellagio Cup VI ===
- Casino: Bellagio, Las Vegas, Nevada
- Buy-in: $10,000 + 300
- 6-Day Event: Jul 11 – 16, 2010
- Number of Entries: 353
- Total Prize Pool: $3,424,100
- Number of Payouts: 50
- Winning Hand: K♥ 10♦

Final Table
Place	Name	Prize
1st	(Germany) Moritz Kranich	$875,150
2nd	(United States) Justin Smith	$594,755
3rd	(United States) Phil Ivey	$363,650
4th	(Australia) John Caridad	$237,902
5th	(United Kingdom) Robert Akery	$169,930
6th	(Canada) Eric Afriat	$118,950

=== Legends of Poker ===
- Casino: The Bicycle Casino, Los Angeles, California
- Buy-in: $4,800 + 200
- 6-Day Event: Aug 20 – 25, 2010
- Number of Entries: 462
- Total Prize Pool: $2,151,072
- Number of Payouts: 45
- Winning Hand: A♣ 9♣

Final Table
Place	Name	Prize
1st	(United States) Andy Frankenberger	$750,000
2nd	(Canada) Kyle Wilson	$370,000
3rd	(United States) Tom Lee	$147,772
4th	(United States) Thomas Braband	$109,000
5th	(United States) Jared Jaffee	$86,000
6th	(United States) Franco Brunetti	$63,000

=== WPT London Poker Classic ===
- Casino: Palm Beach Casino, London, England
- Buy-in: £5000 +£300
- 6-Day Event: August 30, 2010 to September 4, 2010
- Number of Entries: 171
- Total Prize Pool: £820,800
- Number of Payouts: 18
- Winning Hand: Q♠ Q♥

Final Table
Place	Name	Prize
1st	(United Kingdom) Jake Cody	£273,783
2nd	(Sweden) Nichlas Mattsson	£176,979
3rd	(United Kingdom) Bruce Atkinson	£93,316
4th	(Sweden) Kristoffer Thorsson	£56,311
5th	(Italy) Giovanni Safina	£42,233
6th	(United Kingdom) Sandiep Khosa	£34,189
7th	(Germany) Fabian Quoss	£26,144
8th	(United Kingdom) Gareth Teatum	£18,100

=== Borgata Poker Open ===
- Casino: Borgata, Atlantic City, New Jersey
- Buy-in: $3,300 + 200
- 6-Day Event: Sep 19 – 24, 2010
- Number of Entries: 1042
- Total Prize Pool: $3,438,600
- Number of Payouts: 100
- Winning Hand: Q♥ J♠

Final Table
Place	Name	Prize
1st	(United States) Dwyte Pilgrim	$733,802
2nd	(United States) Kianoosh Mohajeri	$440,945
3rd	(United States) Ofir Mor	$266,835
4th	(United States) Brandon Novena	$223,475
5th	(Switzerland) Daniel Makowsky	$183,449
6th	(United States) Benjamin Klier	$148,427

=== Festa al Lago ===
- Casino: Bellagio, Las Vegas, Nevada
- Buy-in: $10,000 + 300
- 6-Day Event: Oct 15 – 20, 2010
- Number of Entries: 335
- Total Prize Pool: $3,224,000
- Number of Payouts: 50
- Winning Hand: 9♣ 3♦

Final Table
Place	Name	Prize
1st	(United States) Randal Flowers	$831,500
2nd	(United States) Michael Benvenuti	$564,200
3rd	(United States) Noah Schwartz	$344,968
4th	(United States) Jason Koon	$225,680
5th	(United States) Andy Frankenberger	$161,200
6th	(United States) Skip Wilson	$112,840

=== Foxwoods World Poker Finals ===
- Casino: Foxwoods Resort Casino, Mashantucket, Connecticut
- Buy-in: $9,700 + 300
- 6-Day Event: Oct 28 – Nov 2, 2010
- Number of Entries: 242
- Total Prize Pool: $2,276,978
- Number of Payouts: 25
- Winning Hand: Q♦ Q♥

Final Table
Place	Name	Prize
1st	(United States) Jeff Forrest	$548,752
2nd	(United States) Dave Inselberg	$325,608
3rd	(United States) Tom Marchese	$211,759
4th	(Russia) Nikolai Yakovenko	$170,773
5th	(United States) Keven Stammen	$128,650
6th	(United States) Mohsin Charania	$104,741

=== WPT Amneville ===
- Casino: Casino Municipal D Amneville, Amnéville, France
- Buy-in: €3200 + €300
- 5-Day Event: 2 Nov 2010 to 6 Nov 2010
- Number of Entries: 543
- Total Prize Pool: €1,640,000
- Number of Payouts: 54
- Winning Hand: K♣ K♥

Final Table
Place	Name	Prize
1st	(Switzerland) Sam El Sayed	€426,425
2nd	(Italy) Franck Pepe	€229,613
3rd	(France) Ilan Boujena	€161,550
4th	(France) Nesrin Kourdourli	€109,886
5th	(United States) William Bresson	€79,545
6th	(France) Jean-Paul Pasqualini	€62,323
7th	(France) Julien Robert	€46,743
8th	(Lebanon) Georges Chehade	€34,442

=== WPT Marrakech ===
- Casino: Casino De Marrakech, Marrakesh, Morocco
- Buy-in: €4,250 + 750
- 4-Day Event: Nov 27 - 30, 2010
- Number of Entries: 222
- Total Prize Pool: €905,528
- Number of Payouts: 27
- Winning Hand: J♠ 9♥

Final Table
Place	Name	Prize
1st	(Germany) Sébastian Homann	€254,745
2nd	(France) Guillaume Cescut	€141,518
3rd	(France) Sébastien Compte	€94,345
4th	(Germany) Félix Oberauer	€75,472
5th	(France) Guillaume de la Gorce	€56,609
6th	(Germany) Dominik Nitsche	€37,736
7th	(Sweden) Johan Williamsson	€30,190
8th	(France) Julien Labussière	€26,418
9th	(France) Patrick Muleta	€19,920

=== Doyle Brunson Five Diamond World Poker Classic ===
- Casino: Bellagio, Las Vegas, Nevada
- Buy-in: $10,000 + 300
- 6-Day Event: Dec 3 – 8, 2010
- Number of Entries: 438
- Total Prize Pool: 4,261,267
- Number of Payouts: 100
- Winning Hand: K♣ J♦

Final Table
Place	Name	Prize
1st	(United States) Antonio Esfandiari	$870,124
2nd	(United States) Andrew Robl	$549,003
3rd	(United States) Vanessa Rousso	$358,964
4th	(United States) John Racener	$232,271
5th	(United States) Kirk Morrison	$168,924
6th	(United States) Ted Lawson	$126,693

=== WPT Southern Poker Championship ===
- Casino: Beau Rivage, Biloxi, Mississippi
- Buy-in: $9,700 + 300
- 7-Day Event: Jan 23 – 27, 2011
- Number of Entries: 214
- Total Prize Pool: $2,011,600
- Number of Payouts: 27
- Winning Hand: K♦ 4♠

Final Table
Place	Name	Prize
1st	(Russia) Alexander Kuzmin	$601,469
2nd	(United States) Leif Force	$315,790
3rd	(United States) Allen Carter	$218,471
4th	(United States) Shannon Shorr	$144,985
5th	(United States) Pat Mahoney	$113,208
6th	(United States) Ryan Hughes	$89,375

=== WPT Venice ===
- Casino: Casino Di Venezia, Venice, Italy
- Buy-in: €3,000 + 300
- 6-Day Event: Feb 3 – 8, 2011
- Number of Entries: 523
- Total Prize Pool: €1,521,930
- Number of Payouts: 54
- Winning Hand: A♥ Q♦

Final Table
Place	Name	Prize
1st	(Italy) Alessio Isaia	€380,000
2nd	(Hungary) Szabolcs Mayer	€228,990
3rd	(United Kingdom) David Vamplew	€149,910
4th	(France) Emmanuel Rodrigues	€101,960
5th	(France) Adrien Camille Garrigues	€73,180
6th	(Italy) Luca Fiorini	€57,830
7th	(Russia) Maxim Lykov	€43,370
8th	(Italy) Renato Paolini	€31,960

=== WPT Celebrity Invitational ===
- Casino: Commerce Casino, Los Angeles, California
- Buy-in:
- 2-Day Event: February 19, 2011
- Number of Entries: 482
- Total Prize Pool: $20,000
- Number of Payouts:
- Winning Hand: Q♥ 3♥

Final Table
Place	Name	Prize
1st	(Belgium) Davidi Kitai	$100,000
2nd	(France) Almira Skripchenko	$50,000
3rd	(United States) Dan Heimiller	$20,000
4th	(United States) George Rechnitzer	$15,000
5th	(United States) Damon Schramm	$10,000
6th	(Canada) Dinara Khaziyeva	$5,000

=== L.A. Poker Classic ===
- Casino: Commerce Casino, Los Angeles, California
- Buy-in: $9,600 + 400
- 6-Day Event: Feb 25 – Mar 3, 2011
- Number of Entries: 681
- Total Prize Pool: $6,537,600
- Number of Payouts: 64
- Winning Hand: 8♠ 7♣

Final Table
Place	Name	Prize
1st	(United States) Gregory Brooks	$1,654,120
2nd	(India) Vivek Rajkumar	$908,730
3rd	(Spain) Carlos Mortensen	$640,680
4th	(United States) Amir Lehavot	$421,680
5th	(United States) Steve Gross	$304,000
6th	(United States) Darryll Fish	$235,350

=== WPT Bay 101 Shooting Star ===
- Casino: Bay 101, San Jose, California
- Buy-in: $9,600 + 400
- 5-Day Event: Mar 14 – Mar 18, 2011
- Number of Entries: 415
- Total Prize Pool: $3,942,500
- Number of Payouts: 45
- Winning Hand: 10♠ 8♠

Final Table
Place	Name	Prize
1st	(United States) Alan Sternberg	$1,039,000
2nd	(United States) Steven Kelly	$595,300
3rd	(United States) Mike Matusow	$369,800
4th	(India) Vivek Rajkumar	$295,800
5th	(United States) Casey McCarrel	$221,800
6th	(United States) Mike Sexton	$148,000

=== WPT Vienna ===
- Casino: Montesino, Vienna, Austria
- Buy-in: €3,200 + 300
- 5-Day Event: Mar 25 – 29, 2011
- Number of Entries: 555
- Total Prize Pool: €1,776,000
- Number of Payouts: 54
- Winning Hand: A♠ 10♥

Final Table
Place	Name	Prize
1st	(Russia) Dmitry Gromov	€447,840
2nd	(Russia) Maxim Kolosov	€241,180
3rd	(Denmark) Simon Ravnsbaek	€169,690
4th	(Italy) Mario Adinolfi	€115,420
5th	(Romania) Valentin Stroiescu	€83,550
6th	(Austria) Maximillian Noll	€65,460
7th	(Italy) Alessio Isaia	€49,100
8th	(Austria) Mark Jenisch	€36,180

=== WPT Bratislava ===
- Casino: Golden Vegas, Bratislava
- Buy-in: €2,500 + 220
- 2-Day Event: March 30, 2011
- Number of Entries: 300
- Total Prize Pool:
- Number of Payouts:
- Winning Hand: 5♣ 5♥

Final Table
Place	Name	Prize
1st	(Wales) Roberto Romanello	€140,685
2nd	(Colombia) Mayu Roca Uribe	€75,220
3rd	(Germany) Alexander Jager	€42,000
4th	(Germany) Frank Dollinger	€33,000
5th	(Sweden) Jesper Hoog	€26,000
6th	(Sweden) Chris Williamson	€21,000
7th	(Austria) Bodo Sbrzesny	€17,000
8th	(Slovakia) Marek Tatar	€14,000
9th	(Slovenia) Lubomir Kudlicka	€11,000

=== WPT Hollywood Poker Open ===
- Casino: Hollywood Casino, Lawrenceburg, Indiana
- Buy-in: $9,600 + 400
- 5-Day Event: Apr 9 – Apr 13, 2011
- Number of Entries: 97
- Total Prize Pool: $911,800
- Number of Payouts: 12
- Winning Hand: J♥ 10♥

Final Table
Place	Name	Prize
1st	(United States) Mike Scarborough	$273,664
2nd	(United States) Erik Seidel	$155,103
3rd	(United States) William Reynolds	$110,788
4th	(United States) Thomas Marchese	$77,551
5th	(United States) Andy Whetstone	$62,041
6th	(United States) Ali Eslami	$50,962

=== Seminole Hard Rock Showdown ===
- Casino: Seminole Hard Rock Hotel and Casino, Hollywood, Florida
- Buy-in: $9,600 + 400
- 5-Day Event: Apr 27 – May 3, 2011
- Number of Entries: 433
- Total Prize Pool: $4,156,800
- Number of Payouts: 45
- Winning Hand: Q♣ 8♦

Final Table
Place	Name	Prize
1st	(United States) Taylor von Kriegenbergh	$1,122,340
2nd	(United States) Curt Kohlberg	$586,109
3rd	(United States) Justin Zaki	$415,680
4th	(United States) Abbey Daniels	$286,819
5th	(United States) Allen Bari	$211,997
6th	(United States) Tommy Vedes	$166,272

=== WPT World Championship ===
- Casino: Bellagio, Las Vegas, Nevada
- Buy-in: $25,000 + 500
- 7-Day Event: May 14, 2011 – May 20, 2011
- Number of Entries: 220
- Total Prize Pool: $5,309,500
- Number of Payouts: 27
- Winning Hand: J♠ 9♦

Final Table
Place	Name	Prize
1st	(United States) Scott Seiver	$1,618,344
2nd	(United States) Farzad Bonyadi	$1,061,900
3rd	(United States) Galen Hall	$589,355
4th	(United States) Roger Teska	$371,665
5th	(United States) Tony Gargano	$278,749
6th	(United States) Justin Young	$225,654

== Other Events ==
During season 9 of the WPT there were three special events that did not apply to the Player of the Year standings:

- The WPT Celebrity Invitational - February 19–20, 2011 - Commerce Casino - prelude to Event #14: L.A. Poker Classic
- The Silicon Valley Power Challenge - March 13, 2011 - Bay 101 Casino - prelude to Event #15: WPT Bay 101 Shooting Star
- The WPT World Championship Super High Roller - May 18–19, 2011 - Bellagio - coincident with end of Event #19: WPT World Championship

== Season IX Player of the Year ==
Andy Frankenberger won Player of the Year.

Final Standings
Rank	Name	Points
1	Andy Frankenberger	2,100
2	Vivek Rajkumar	2,000
3	Sam El Sayed	1,800
4	Alessio Isaia	1,750
5	Kia Mohajeri	1,700
5	Shannon Shorr	1,700

Top 6 players, including ties.
