= Noah Schwartz =

American poker player (born 1983)

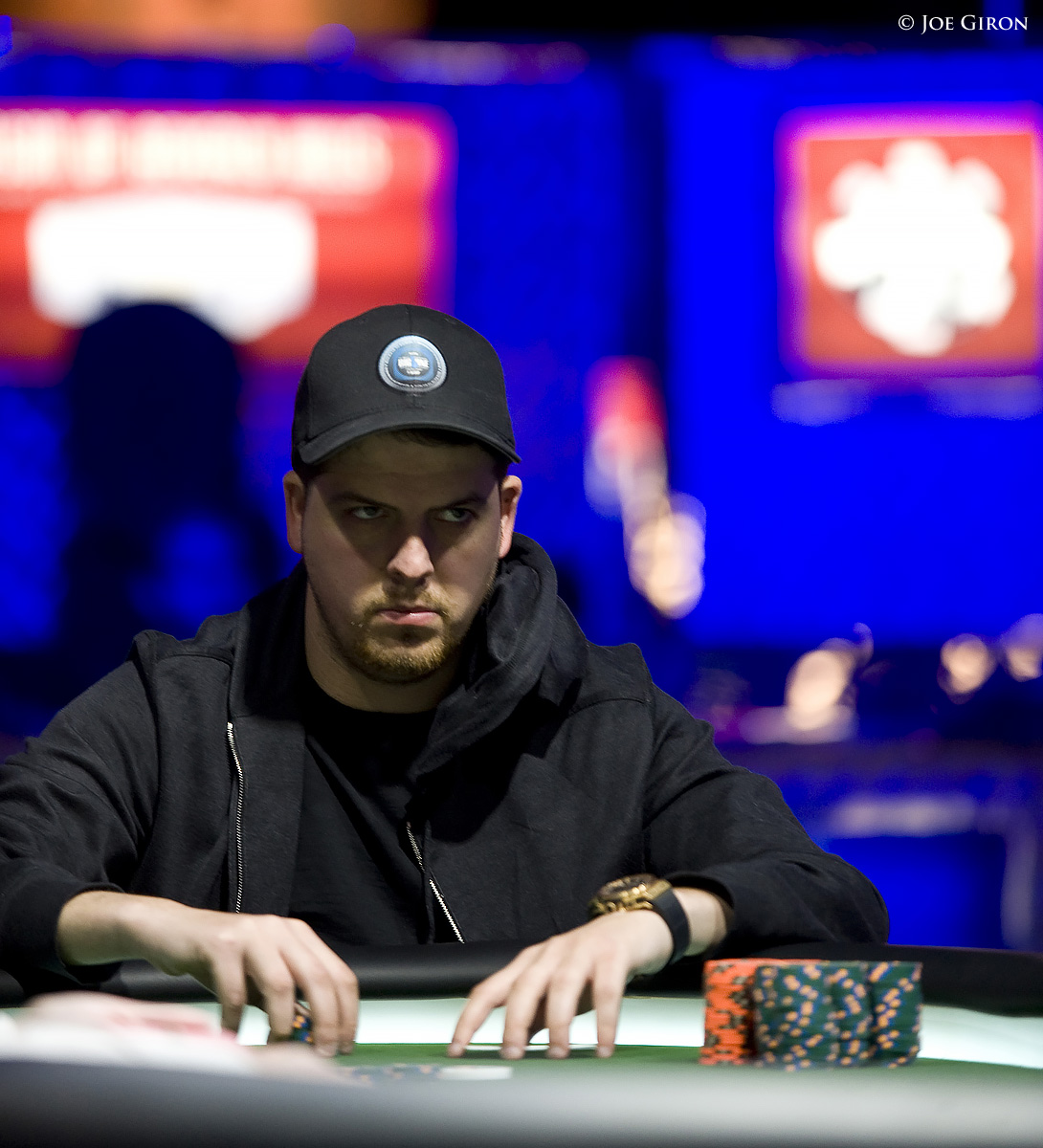
- Schwartz at a 2013 World Series of Poker event
- Born: August 1, 1983 (age 43)

World Series of Poker
- Bracelet: 1
- Final tables: 5
- Money finishes: 19
- Highest WSOP Main Event finish: 52nd, 2013

World Poker Tour
- Titles: 2
- Final tables: 8
- Money finishes: 20

Noah Schwartz (born August 1, 1983) is an American professional poker player from Miami Beach, Florida. He has won a World Series of Poker bracelet and a World Poker Tour title. He has reached six WPT final tables, five WSOP final tables and his lifetime winnings as of April 2016 exceed $5.3 million.

== Early life ==
Schwartz was born and raised in South Florida. He played high school baseball and was a highly recruited left-handed pitcher. During his freshman year at Florida International University he injured his elbow, prematurely ending his baseball career. He finished school and received a bachelor's degree in finance.

== Poker career ==
When he was 17 his father died suddenly of cancer and Schwartz began playing poker as a distraction. At first he played a weekly game with friends and family but then moved to online poker. He financed his PartyPoker account with a credit card and a student loan for $25,000. Early on his earnings and losses were volatile. He won a couple of tournaments and was capable of winning tens of thousands of dollars a day but he would often lose it quickly, playing long hours with little sleep. In 2006, with the last of the money in his account, Schwartz entered a PartyPoker tournament and won $93,000. This time he used the money to pay off his debts. He grew more disciplined in his approach and began winning small amounts consistently. In 2007 he won PokerStars Sunday Second Chance for $47,000, followed by PokerStars Sunday Million for $291,473.

That same year Schwartz began playing live with the money he had won online. He immediately began playing $5,000 and $10,000 events and had some success at the 2007 World Series of Poker Main Event, coming in 252nd place. After winning a few small cashes on the World Poker Tour, Schwartz took fourth in the 2008 Borgata Winter Open for $331, 958, which was his largest payday up to that point. He managed four more final tables over the next year before finishing eighth in the 2009 WSOP $40,000 buy-in event for $246,834. He took third in the 2010 WPT Festa Al Lago main event for $344,968 and in 2011 he made the final table for both WSOP Europe and Epic Poker League, earning $149,740 and $89,680 respectively. Schwartz started 2012 with a win in a PokerStars Caribbean Adventure Preliminary event and then made another WPT final table, finishing fourth in the LA Poker Classic for $355,750. That summer he also took sixth in the EPT Grand Final high roller event for $219,535.

In 2012 Schwartz gained attention by funding his one-million-dollar entry fee for The Big One for One Drop tournament through investor capital. He registered a company called One Drop Investments LLC and received commitments from about a dozen investors. The Wall Street Journal cited it as an example of the growing trend of successful players drumming up interest from hedge fund managers, real estate moguls and wealthy businessmen.

In November 2012 Schwartz won his first World Poker Tour title at the Jacksonville bestbet Fall Poker Scramble, beating a field of 477 entrants and earning $402,970. In 2013 Schwartz earned his first World Series of Poker bracelet, beating Ludovic Lacay to win the €3,000 Pot-Limit Omaha Mixed Max Event at the 2013 WSOP Europe in Cannes, France. In December 2014 Schwartz made the final table in the WPT Alpha8 Las Vegas, finishing fourth and winning $539,550. In January 2015 Schwartz won the World Poker Tour's Alpha8 Florida tournament at the Seminole Hard Rock Casino. He won $585,000 and became the first player in poker history to win both an Alpha8 title and a regular WPT title.

As of 2023, Schwartz's total live earnings are greater than $6.5 million.

== Personal life ==
Schwartz resides in Sunny Isles Beach, Florida. He is involved with the Make-a-Wish Foundation and the South Florida After-School All-Stars organization.
