= World Poker Tour season 18 results =

Below are the results of season 18 of the World Poker Tour (2019–21). There were 29 scheduled events.

As a result of the COVID-19 pandemic, several events on the schedule were postponed. In addition, three final tables that were supposed to take place at the HyperX Esports Arena at the Luxor Hotel & Casino in Las Vegas were also delayed.

In January 2021, the WPT returned with the WPT Lucky Hearts Poker Open, the first live event since March 2020. The three final tables that were delayed were played in either March or May, more than a year after the lineup was set.

The Seminole Hard Rock Poker Showdown, the final event on the schedule, set a new record for the largest WPT event with 2,482 entrants.

== Events ==
=== Gardens Poker Festival ===
- Casino: The Gardens Casino, Hawaiian Gardens, California
- Buy-in: $5,000
- 6-Day Event: July 20–25, 2019
- Number of Entries: 373
- Total Prize Pool: $1,753,100
- Number of Payouts: 48

Final Table
Place	Name	Prize
1st	(United States) Roger Teska	$368,475
2nd	(Hungary) Laszlo Molnar	$235,615
3rd	(United States) Lior Orel	$172,770
4th	(Germany) Lars Kamphues	$128,320
5th	(United States) Andrew Wisdom	$96,545
6th	(United States) Cord Garcia	$73,600

=== Legends of Poker ===
- Casino: The Bicycle Hotel & Casino, Bell Gardens, California
- Buy-in: $5,000
- 5-Day Event: August 31-September 4, 2019
- Number of Entries: 520
- Total Prize Pool: $2,392,000
- Number of Payouts: 65

Final Table
Place	Name	Prize
1st	(United States) Aaron Van Blarcum	$474,390
2nd	(United States) Gueorgui Gantchev	$306,265
3rd	(United States) Jared Griener	$226,040
4th	(United States) Vahan Sudzhyan	$168,630
5th	(United States) Jisup Hwang	$127,165
6th	(Greece) Antonios Roungeris	$96,955

=== Borgata Poker Open ===
- Casino: Borgata Hotel Casino & Spa, Atlantic City, New Jersey
- Buy-in: $3,500
- 6-Day Event: September 15–20, 2019
- Number of Entries: 1,156
- Total Prize Pool: $3,700,356
- Number of Payouts: 145

Final Table
Place	Name	Prize
1st	(United States) Donald Maloney	$616,186
2nd	(Albania) Uke Dauti	$410,787
3rd	(United States) Kevin Albers	$303,903
4th	(United States) Dave Farah	$227,077
5th	(United Kingdom) Jerry Maher	$171,386
6th	(United States) Victor Ramdin	$130,672

=== WPT Maryland at Live! Casino ===
- Casino: Live! Casino & Hotel, Hanover, Maryland
- Buy-in: $3,500
- 5-Day Event: September 28-October 2, 2019
- Number of Entries: 495
- Total Prize Pool: $1,584,000
- Number of Payouts: 62

Final Table
Place	Name	Prize
1st	(United States) Nitis Udornpim	$319,415
2nd	(United States) Stephen Deutsch	$202,905
3rd	(United States) Brian Altman	$149,515
4th	(United States) Anthony Zinno	$111,415
5th	(United States) Robert McLaughlin	$83,970
6th	(United States) Jeffrey Colpitts	$64,020

=== WPT UK ===
- Casino: Dusk Till Dawn Poker & Casino, Nottingham, England
- Buy-in: $3,300
- 5-Day Event: October 2–6, 2019
- Number of Entries: 690
- Total Prize Pool: $2,007,900
- Number of Payouts: 100

Final Table
Place	Name	Prize
1st	(Sweden) Simon Brändström	$330,000
2nd	(United Kingdom) Ryan Mandara	$221,650
3rd	(United Kingdom) James Rann	$168,500
4th	(United Kingdom) Matthew Eardley	$128,500
5th	(Argentina) Maria Lampropulos	$98,500
6th	(United Kingdom) Paul Siddle	$76,000

=== bestbet Bounty Scramble ===
- Casino: bestjet Jacksonville, Jacksonville, Florida
- Buy-in: $5,000
- 5-Day Event: October 11–15, 2019
- Number of Entries: 349
- Total Prize Pool: $1,615,870
- Number of Payouts: 45

Final Table
Place	Name	Prize
1st	(United States) Josh Adkins	$331,480
2nd	(United States) Tan Nguyen	$210,988
3rd	(United States) Josh Kay	$155,340
4th	(South Korea) Jason Lee	$115,691
5th	(United States) Jonathan Cronin	$87,170
6th	(United States) Jeff Cunningham	$66,457

=== WPT Montreal ===
- Casino: Playground Poker Club, Kahnawake, Quebec
- Buy-in: $3,300
- 6-Day Event: October 29-November 3, 2019
- Number of Entries: 1,109
- Total Prize Pool: $3,327,000
- Number of Payouts: 159

Final Table
Place	Name	Prize
1st	(Canada) Geoffrey Hum	$500,000
2nd	(United States) Adedapo Ajayi	$335,000
3rd	(United States) Joseph Cheong	$235,290
4th	(Canada) Mike Watson	$180,000
5th	(Canada) Kristen Bicknell	$140,000
6th	(Sweden) Martin Jacobson	$110,000

=== Seminole Rock 'N' Roll Poker Open ===
- Casino: Seminole Hard Rock Hotel & Casino, Hollywood, Florida
- Buy-in: $3,500
- 6-Day Event: November 29-December 4, 2019
- Number of Entries: 988
- Total Prize Pool: $3,161,600
- Number of Payouts: 124

Final Table
Place	Name	Prize
1st	(Bulgaria) Milen Stefanov	$545,070
2nd	(Germany) Fabian Gumz	$353,380
3rd	(United States) David Novosel	$260,845
4th	(Russia) Roman Korenev	$194,605
5th	(Venezuela) Cesar Fuentes	$146,760
6th	(United States) Francis Anderson	$111,895

=== Five Diamond World Poker Classic ===
- Casino: Bellagio Resort & Casino, Las Vegas, Nevada
- Buy-in: $10,400
- 5-Day Event: December 16–21, 2019
- Number of Entries: 1,035
- Total Prize Pool: $10,039,500
- Number of Payouts: 130

Final Table
Place	Name	Prize
1st	(United States) Alex Foxen	$1,694,995
2nd	(Republic of Ireland) Toby Joyce	$1,120,040
3rd	(United States) Seth Davies	$827,285
4th	(United States) Peter Neff	$617,480
5th	(United States) Daniel Park	$465,780
6th	(United States) Jonathan Jaffe	$355,125

=== Gardens Poker Championship ===
- Casino: The Gardens Casino, Hawaiian Gardens, California
- Buy-in: $10,000
- 5-Day Event: January 9–13, 2020 (Final Table: March 10, 2021)
- Number of Entries: 257
- Total Prize Pool: $2,467,200
- Number of Payouts: 33

Final Table
Place	Name	Prize
1st	(United States) Markus Gonsalves	$554,495
2nd	(United States) Tuan Phan	$359,650
3rd	(Canada) Jonathan Cohen	$263,090
4th	(United States) Chance Kornuth	$195,085
5th	(United States) Straton Wilhelm	$146,655
6th	(United States) Qing Liu	$111,795

=== Lucky Hearts Poker Open ===
- Casino: Seminole Hard Rock Hotel & Casino, Hollywood, Florida
- Buy-in: $3,500
- 6-Day Event: January 17–22, 2020
- Number of Entries: 843
- Total Prize Pool: $2,697,600
- Number of Payouts: 106
- Note: Altman becomes the first player to win the same WPT event twice.

Final Table
Place	Name	Prize
1st	(United States) Brian Altman	$482,636
2nd	(United States) John Dollinger	$311,751
3rd	(Canada) Chanracy Khun	$230,086
4th	(Russia) Nadya Magnus	$171,642
5th	(United States) Nadeem Hirani	$129,438
6th	(United States) Peter Walsworth	$98,686

=== WPT Russia ===
- Casino: Casino Sochi, Sochi, Russia
- Buy-in: RUB 210,000
- 6-Day Event: January 21–26, 2020
- Number of Entries: 489
- Total Prize Pool: RUB 95,500,000
- Number of Payouts: 71

Final Table
Place	Name	Prize
1st	(Russia) Aleksey Badulin	RUB 16,257,000
2nd	(Serbia) Vlada Stojanovic	RUB 11,550,000
3rd	(Russia) Ernest Shakaryan	RUB 8,442,490
4th	(Armenia) Vahe Martirosyan	RUB 6,370,000
5th	(Russia) Sergey Kharlamov	RUB 4,900,000
6th	(Russia) Roman Timergazin	RUB 3,745,000

=== Borgata Winter Poker Open ===
- Casino: Borgata Hotel Casino & Spa, Atlantic City, New Jersey
- Buy-in: $3,500
- 5-Day Event: January 26–30, 2020 (Final Table: May 16, 2021)
- Number of Entries: 1,290
- Total Prize Pool: $4,129,290
- Number of Payouts: 162

Final Table
Place	Name	Prize
1st	(Canada) Veerab Zakarian	$674,840
2nd	(United States) James Anderson	$449,904
3rd	(United States) Brian Altman	$333,012
4th	(United States) Nathan Russler	$248,913
5th	(United States) Bin Weng	$187,900
6th	(United States) Andrew Hanna	$143,264

=== WPT Germany ===
- Casino: King's Resort, Rozvadov, Czech Republic
- Buy-in: €3,300
- 6-Day Event: February 18–23, 2020
- Number of Entries: 510
- Total Prize Pool: €1,453,500
- Number of Payouts: 73

Final Table
Place	Name	Prize
1st	(Germany) Christopher Pütz	€270,000
2nd	(Hungary) Laszlo Papai	€174,500
3rd	(Netherlands) Joep van den Bijgaart	€125,000
4th	(Czech Republic) Josef Gulas	€91,000
5th	(Italy) Gianluca Speranza	€68,000
6th	(Netherlands) Farukh Tach	€52,000

=== Fallsview Poker Classic ===
- Casino: Fallsview Casino Resort, Niagara Falls, Ontario
- Buy-in: $5,000
- 3-Day Event: February 21–23, 2020
- Number of Entries: 594
- Total Prize Pool: $2,708,046
- Number of Payouts: 75

Final Table
Place	Name	Prize
1st	(Canada) Eric Afriat	$508,021
2nd	(Canada) Marc-Olivier Carpentier-Perrault	$356,180
3rd	(Canada) Adam Hui	$229,013
4th	(Canada) Trung Hien Nguyen	$163,965
5th	(Canada) Demo Kiriopoulos	$125,850
6th	(Canada) Zuhair Al-Pachachi	$103,217

=== L.A. Poker Classic ===
- Casino: The Commerce Hotel & Casino, Commerce, California
- Buy-in: $10,000
- 5-Day Event: February 29-March 4, 2020 (Final Table: May 17, 2021)
- Number of Entries: 490
- Total Prize Pool: $4,727,550
- Number of Payouts: 62

Final Table
Place	Name	Prize
1st	(United States) Balakrishna Patur	$1,015,000
2nd	(Lithuania) Matas Cimbolas	$600,060
3rd	(United States) James Carroll	$431,585
4th	(Canada) Scott Hempel	$323,485
5th	(Hong Kong) Ka Kwan Lau	$243,330
6th	(United States) Upeshka De Silva	$185,330

=== WPT Rolling Thunder ===
- Casino: Thunder Valley Casino Resort, Lincoln, California
- Buy-in: $5,000
- 4-Day Event: March 7–10, 2020
- Number of Entries: 250
- Total Prize Pool: $1,162,500
- Number of Payouts: 32

Final Table
Place	Name	Prize
1st	(Vietnam) Tony Tran	$279,270
2nd	(United States) Jake Schwartz	$177,680
3rd	(Germany) Robert Heidorn	$122,105
4th	(United States) Kevin Rabichow	$85,800
5th	(United States) Erkut Yilmaz	$61,685
6th	(United States) Shankar Pillai	$45,390

=== WPT Online Championship ===
- Casino: Online (partypoker)
- Buy-in: $3,200
- 7-Day Event: May 10–20, 2020
- Number of Entries: 2,130
- Total Prize Pool: $6,390,000
- Number of Payouts: 312

Final Table
Place	Name	Prize
1st	(Sweden) Christian Jeppsson	$923,786
2nd	(Russia) Viktor Ustimov	$865,542
3rd	(Finland) Jukka Koskela	$477,333
4th	(Russia) Nikolay Ponomarev	$317,583
5th	(United States) Alexander Clark	$221,733
6th	(Germany) Pascal Hartmann	$151,443

=== World Championship 8-Max by partypoker ===
- Casino: Online (partypoker)
- Buy-in: $3,200
- 4-Day Event: August 1–4, 2020
- Number of Entries: 1,062
- Total Prize Pool: $3,186,000
- Number of Payouts: 136

Final Table
Place	Name	Prize
1st	(United Kingdom) Gavin Cochrane	$540,664
2nd	(Belgium) Thomas Boivin	$388,119
3rd	(Austria) Lars Kamphues	$256,728
4th	(Russia) Dmitry Yurasov	$173,956
5th	(Kazakhstan) Shyngis Satubayev	$123,298
6th	(United States) Dan Colpoys	$87,296

=== World Championship 6-Max by partypoker ===
- Casino: Online (partypoker)
- Buy-in: $3,200
- 4-Day Event: August 8–11, 2020
- Number of Entries: 999
- Total Prize Pool: $3,000,000
- Number of Payouts: 120

Final Table
Place	Name	Prize
1st	(United States) Nick Petrangelo	$494,550
2nd	(Belarus) Artsiom Prostak	$368,250
3rd	(Russia) Arsenii Karmatckii	$278,448
4th	(Germany) Patrice Brandt	$192,900
5th	(Canada) Jiachen Gong	$128,100
6th	(United Kingdom) Elior Sion	$93,630

=== World Championship Knockout by partypoker ===
- Casino: Online (partypoker)
- Buy-in: $3,200
- 4-Day Event: August 15–18, 2020
- Number of Entries: 1,035
- Total Prize Pool: $3,105,000
- Number of Payouts: 136

Final Table
Place	Name	Prize
1st	(Republic of Ireland) Daniel Smyth	$408,330
2nd	(Germany) Manig Löser	$272,234
3rd	(Brazil) Joao Maureli	$172,073
4th	(Netherlands) Pim Gieles	$118,231
5th	(Portugal) Pedro Marques	$85,320
6th	(Russia) Artur Martirosyan	$62,000

=== World Championship Mix-Max by partypoker ===
- Casino: Online (partypoker)
- Buy-in: $3,200
- 4-Day Event: August 22–25, 2020
- Number of Entries: 989
- Total Prize Pool: $3,000,000
- Number of Payouts: 132

Final Table
Place	Name	Prize
1st	(Russia) Andrey Kotelnikov	$488,508
2nd	(United Kingdom) Stuart Guite	$366,605
3rd	(Sweden) Sven Andersson	$271,903
4th	(Ukraine) Oleg Vasylchenko	$190,500
5th	(United Kingdom) Maciej Gasior	$124,500
6th	(Bulgaria) Dimitar Danchev	$89,016

=== WPT World Championship Main Event ===
- Casino: Online (partypoker)
- Buy-in: $10,300
- 11-Day Event: September 6–16, 2020
- Number of Entries: 1,011
- Total Prize Pool: $10,110,000
- Number of Payouts: 136

Final Table
Place	Name	Prize
1st	(United Kingdom) Phillip Mighall	$1,715,667
2nd	(Netherlands) Teun Mulder	$1,231,600
3rd	(Argentina) Damian Salas	$814,664
4th	(Slovenia) Blaz Zerjav	$552,006
5th	(Brazil) Victor Simionato	$391,257
6th	(Poland) Dzmitry Urbanovich	$277,014

=== WPT Online Poker Open ===
- Casino: Online (partypoker US Network)
- Buy-in: $3,500
- 3-Day Event: December 27–29, 2020
- Number of Entries: 395
- Total Prize Pool: $1,264,000
- Number of Payouts: 64

Final Table
Place	Name	Prize
1st	(United States) Soheb Porbandarwala	$239,820
2nd	(Canada) Balakrishna Patur	$164,868
3rd	(United States) Matt Iles	$127,398
4th	unknown	$95,948
5th	(United States) Obli Prabu	$75,565
6th	(United States) Alex Farin	$56,830

=== WPT Montreal Online ===
- Casino: Online (partypoker)
- Buy-in: $3,200
- 5-Day Event: January 17–27, 2021
- Number of Entries: 888
- Total Prize Pool: $2,664,000
- Number of Payouts: 133

Final Table
Place	Name	Prize
1st	(United Kingdom) Jack Hardcastle	$447,859
2nd	(Canada) Rayan Chamas	$308,703
3rd	(United States) Dan Shak	$212,459
4th	(Germany) Felix Schulze	$139,164
5th	(Germany) Andrei Kriazhev	$95,673
6th	(United Kingdom) Charles Chattha	$74,119

=== WPT Lucky Hearts Poker Open ===
- Casino: Seminole Hard Rock Hotel & Casino, Hollywood, Florida
- Buy-in: $3,500
- 5-Day Event: January 22–26, 2021
- Number of Entries: 1,573
- Total Prize Pool: $5,033,600
- Number of Payouts: 197

Final Table
Place	Name	Prize
1st	(United States) Ilyas Muradi	$620,000
2nd	(United States) Robel Andemichael	$545,500
3rd	(United States) Ronnie Bardah	$566,135
4th	(United States) Francis Margaglione	$293,510
5th	(United States) Jesse Lonis	$223,895
6th	(United States) Philip Shing	$168,990

=== WPT Russia ===
- Casino: Casino Sochi, Sochi, Russia
- Buy-in: 245,000 RUB
- 6-Day Event: February 23–28, 2021
- Number of Entries: 251
- Total Prize Pool: $
- Number of Payouts: 118

Final Table
Place	Name	Prize (RUB)
1st	(Russia) Maksim Sekretarev	11,996,600 ($160,694)
2nd	(Russia) Andrey Volkov	7,998,200 ($107,135)
3rd	(Russia) Ravil Khamatgareev	5,840,450 ($78,232)
4th	(Serbia) Vladimir Bozinovic	4,325,650 ($57,942)
5th	(Russia) Vanush Mnatsakanyan	3,249,750 ($43,530)
6th	(Russia) Sergey Bobrik	2,477,300 ($33,183)

=== WPT at Venetian ===
- Casino: The Venetian Resort, Las Vegas, Nevada
- Buy-in: $5,000
- 5-Day Event: March 5–9, 2021
- Number of Entries: 937
- Total Prize Pool: $4,333,625
- Number of Payouts: 118

Final Table
Place	Name	Prize
1st	(United States) Qing Liu	$752,880
2nd	(United States) Joe McKeehen	$491,960
3rd	(Austria) Roland Rokita	$363,235
4th	(United Kingdom) Jack Hardcastle	$271,050
5th	(United States) Kou Vang	$204,430
6th	(United States) Trace Henderson	$155,865

=== Seminole Hard Rock Poker Showdown ===
- Casino: Seminole Hard Rock Hotel & Casino, Hollywood, Florida
- Buy-in: $3,500
- 5-Day Event: April 23–27, 2021 (Final Table: May 18)
- Number of Entries: 2,482
- Total Prize Pool: $7,942,000
- Number of Payouts: 311
- Note: Established a new record for largest WPT event

Final Table
Place	Name	Prize
1st	(United States) Brek Schutten	$1,261,095
2nd	(United States) Steven Snyder	$899,295
3rd	(United States) Viet Vo	$593,140
4th	(France) Sonny Franco	$438,500
5th	(United States) Albert Calderon	$326,750
6th	(United States) Ken Aldridge	$261,700

== Player of the Year ==
Standings
Rank	Name	Points
1	(United States) Brian Altman	3,200
2	(United States) Balakrishna Patur	2,300
3	(United Kingdom) Jack Hardcastle	2,200
4	(United States) Qing Liu	2,000
5	(Canada) Eric Afriat	1,750
