= Fabrice Soulier =

French poker player (born 1969)

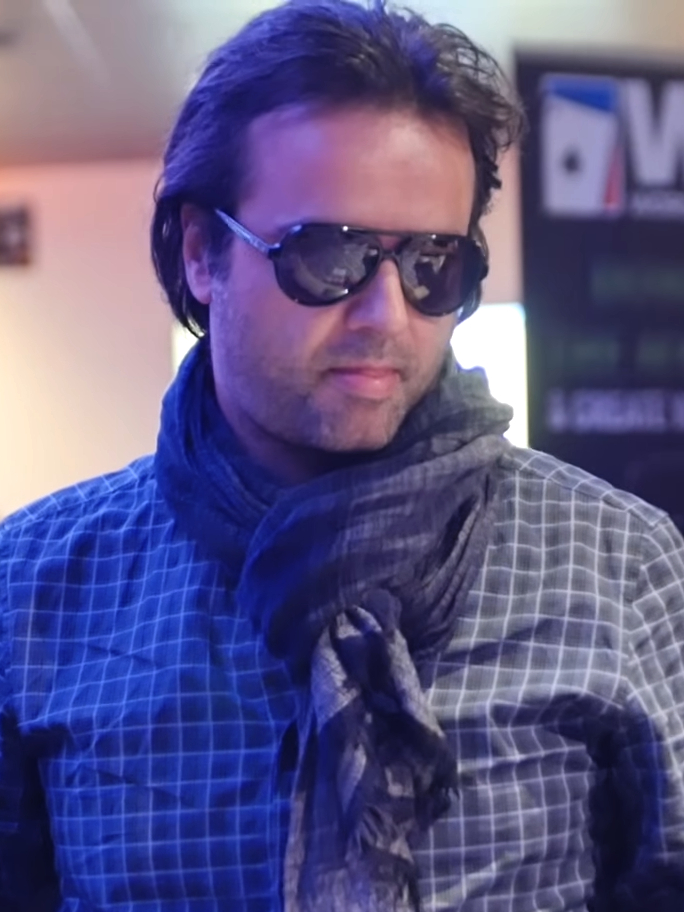
- Soulier in 2017
- Nickname: fabsoul (PokerStars)
- Born: 23 April 1969 (age 57); Avignon, France

World Series of Poker
- Bracelet: 1
- Final tables: 5
- Money finishes: 25
- Highest WSOP Main Event finish: 49th, 2009

World Poker Tour
- Title: none
- Final table: 1
- Money finishes: 5

European Poker Tour
- Title: 2
- Final table: 5
- Money finishes: 17

Fabrice Soulier (born 23 April 1969 in Avignon, France) is a professional poker player with over $5.5 Million in live poker tournament winnings and won his first bracelet in the 2011 World Series of Poker $10,000 H.O.R.S.E. Championship. In 2013 he was the runner up in the 2013 World Series of Poker Europe €10,000 + 450 No Limit Hold'em - Main Event (Event #6), Earning him €610,000 ($824,513). In March 2014, Fabrice took down the €10,000 + 300 No Limit Hold'em EPT High Roller event for €392,900 ($542,342).

== Biography ==
He was director of the French TV series Farce Attaque (Farce Attack) and Un gars, une fille (A Guy, A Girl) before focusing only on poker. He now lives in Las Vegas. He also has been one of the poker teacher for the French show NRJ Pokerstars with Bertrand "Elky"Grospellier. Then, he created the website www.madeinpoker.fr which is an information site. In 2009, he cashed in the money for the first time in the $10,000 Main Event finishing in 49th place out of a field of 6,494 players, earning $138,568

== World Series of Poker bracelet ==
Year	Tournament	Prize (US$)
2011	$10,000 H.O.R.S.E. Championship	$609,130

As of 2011, his total live tournament winnings exceed $5,500,000.
