= Brian Altman (poker player) =

American poker player (born 1988)

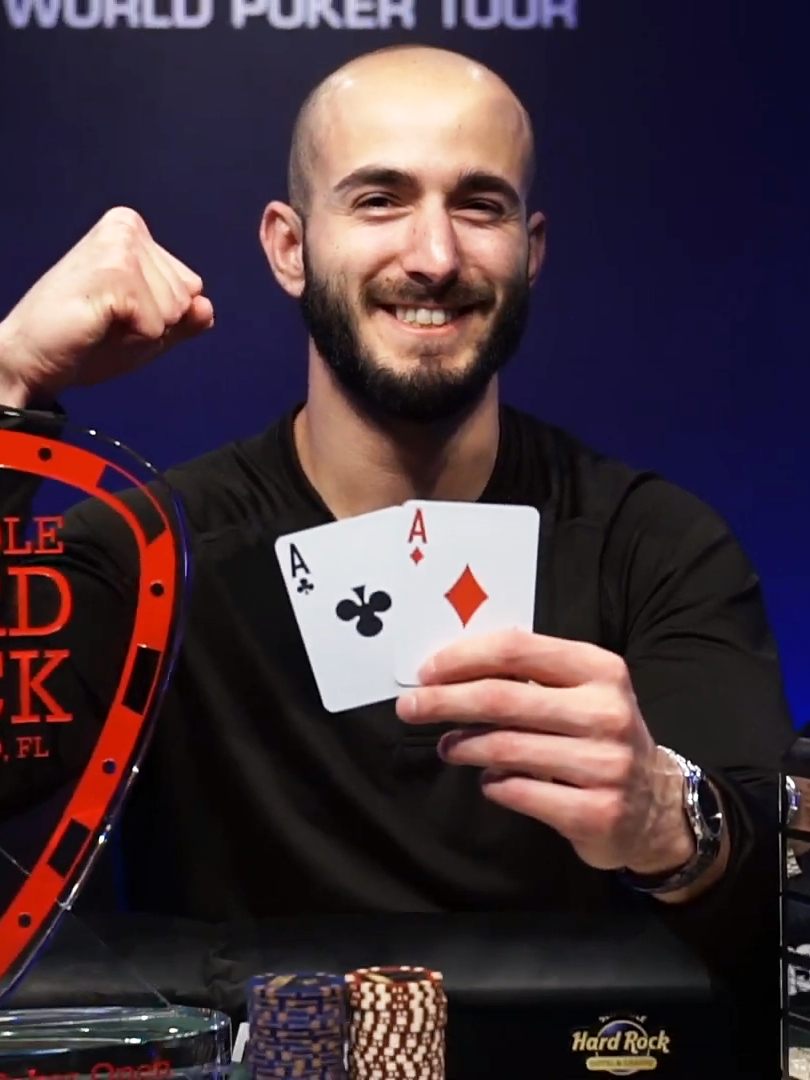
- Altman at the 2020 Lucky Hearts Poker Open
- Born: Longmeadow, Massachusetts

World Series of Poker
- Bracelet: None
- Final table: 1
- Money finishes: 30
- Highest WSOP Main Event finish: 113th, 2018

World Poker Tour
- Titles: 3
- Final tables: 6
- Money finishes: 27

European Poker Tour
- Money finishes: 4

Brian Altman (born 1988) is an American professional poker player from Longmeadow, Massachusetts. He has won three titles on the World Poker Tour (WPT).

== Poker career ==
Altman earned a doctorate in 2012 from the Albany College of Pharmacy and Health Sciences in Albany, New York. He began playing poker with his friends in high school after watching Chris Moneymaker win the 2003 World Series of Poker Main Event, and moved to Montreal, Quebec after college to play online poker full-time.

Altman's first World Poker Tour title came at the Lucky Hearts Poker Open in February 2015, where he outlasted a field of 1,027 and earned $723,000. In January 2020, he won the tournament again, this time against a field of 843. He became the first player in WPT history to win the same event twice. Altman won his third title at the Seminole Hard Rock Tampa in June 2021 against a field of 1,165, becoming the seventh player to win three WPT titles. He has made another three final tables, including two third-place finishes. His 27 career cashes are tied for seventh-most as of 2021.

With one win, three final tables, and $1,011,000 in earnings, Altman was named WPT Player of the Year for season 18.

At the WSOP, Altman has 30 career cashes and finished third in a WSOP Online event in 2020. He finished 113th in the Main Event in 2018, eliminating Phil Ivey on Day 4 after calling an all-in with top two pair.

Altman also made the final table of the PokerStars Caribbean Adventure in 2019, finishing in sixth place for $297,000.

As of 2021, Altman's career live tournament winnings exceed $5.3 million.

== World Poker Tour titles ==
Year	Tournament	Prize (US$)
2015	$3,200 Lucky Hearts Poker Open	$723,008
2020	$3,500 Lucky Hearts Poker Open	$482,636
2021	$3,500 Seminole Hard Rock Tampa	$613,225
