= World Poker Tour season 20 results =

Below are the results for season 20 (2022) of the World Poker Tour. There were ten scheduled events for the season.

The Seminole Hard Rock Poker Showdown and WPT Choctaw final tables would be delayed and played at the HyperX Esports Arena at the Luxor in Las Vegas, Nevada.

== Events ==
=== Lucky Hearts Poker Open ===
- Casino: Seminole Hard Rock Hotel & Casino, Hollywood, Florida
- Buy-in: $3,500
- 6-Day Event: January 21–26, 2022
- Number of Entries: 1,982
- Total Prize Pool: $6,342,400
- Number of Payouts: 248

Final Table
Place	Name	Prize
1st	(United States) Alexander Yen	$975,240
2nd	(Sweden) Anton Wigg	$650,180
3rd	(United States) Daniel Lazrus	$482,380
4th	(United States) Nicholas Verderamo	$361,130
5th	(United States) Josh Kay	$272,830
6th	(Algeria) Omar Lakhdari	$208,025

=== Seminole Hard Rock Poker Showdown ===
- Casino: Seminole Hard Rock Hotel & Casino, Hollywood, Florida
- Buy-in: $3,500
- 5-Day Event: April 8–12, 2022
- Number of Entries: 2,010
- Total Prize Pool: $6,432,000
- Number of Payouts: 252

Final Table
Place	Name	Prize
1st	(United States) Mark Davis	$1,000,300
2nd	(United States) Darren Elias	$660,000
3rd	(Brazil) Marcos Exterkotter	$490,000
4th	(United States) Viet Vo	$370,000
5th	(United States) Andrew Barfield	$280,000
6th	(United States) Michael Laufer	$215,000

=== WPT Choctaw ===
- Casino: Choctaw Casino & Resort, Durant, Oklahoma
- Buy-in: $3,800
- 6-Day Event: May 13–16, 2022
- Number of Entries: 787
- Total Prize Pool: $2,754,500
- Number of Payouts: 100

Final Table
Place	Name	Prize
1st	(United States) Chance Kornuth	$486,600
2nd	(United States) Steve Buckner	$320,000
3rd	(United States) Ray Qartomy	$235,000
4th	(United States) James Hundt	$175,000
5th	(Canada) Kristen Foxen	$135,000
6th	(United States) James Mackey	$101,000

=== WPT Venetian Las Vegas ===
- Casino: The Venetian Resort Las Vegas, Las Vegas, Nevada
- Buy-in: $5,000
- 5-Day Event: July 12–17, 2022
- Number of Entries: 1,178
- Total Prize Pool: $5,418,000
- Number of Payouts: 148

Final Table
Place	Name	Prize
1st	(United States) Robert Mizrachi	$894,100
2nd	(United States) Mike Vanier	$595,000
3rd	(Bulgaria) Yulian Bogdanov	$440,000
4th	(Germany) Leon Sturm	$327,000
5th	(Spain) Raul Manzanares	$247,000
6th	(Spain) Javier Zarco	$188,000

=== Legends of Poker ===
- Casino: Bicycle Casino, Los Angeles, California
- Buy-in: $5,250
- 3-Day Event: August 27 - September 1, 2022
- Number of Entries: 642
- Total Prize Pool: $3,113,700
- Number of Payouts: 81

Final Table
Place	Name	Prize
1st	(United States) Joshua Pollock	$573,350
2nd	(United States) Ray Qartomy	$380,000
3rd	(United States) Matthew Wantman	$280,000
4th	(United States) Aaron Motoyama	$207,000
5th	(United States) Lei Lei	$256,000
6th	(United States) Adam Hendrix	$119,000

=== Seminole Hard Rock Tampa ===
- Casino: Seminole Hard Rock Hotel and Casino, Tampa, Florida
- Buy-in: $3,500
- 5-Day Event: September 2–7, 2022
- Number of Entries: 1,165
- Total Prize Pool: $3,728,000
- Number of Payouts: 147

Final Table
Place	Name	Prize
1st	(United States) Corey Wade	$471,686
2nd	(United States) Maurice Paradis	$441,686
3rd	(United States) Brock Wilson	$411,678
4th	(United States) Steven McKoy	$226,000
5th	(United States) Seth Berger	$170,000
6th	(United States) David Tuthill	$130,000

=== WPT Australia ===
- Casino: The Star Gold Coast, Gold Coast, Australia
- Buy-in: AU$5,400
- 5-Day Event: September 23–27, 2022
- Number of Entries: 710
- Total Prize Pool: AU$3,550,000
- Number of Payouts: 89

Final Table
Place	Name	Prize
1st	(Australia) David Tang	AU$647,470
2nd	(Australia) Po Hu	AU$421,635
3rd	(Australia) Najeem Ajez	AU$310,675
4th	(Japan) Daisuke Ogita	AU$231,505
5th	(Australia) Josh Hutchins	AU$174,480
6th	(Taiwan) Li De	AU$133,025

=== Five Diamond World Poker Classic ===
- Casino: Bellagio Resort & Casino, Las Vegas, Nevada
- Buy-in: $10,400
- 5-Day Event: October 19–23, 2022
- Number of Entries: 569
- Total Prize Pool: $5,519,300
- Number of Payouts: 72

Final Table
Place	Name	Prize
1st	(United States) Chad Eveslage	$1,042,300
2nd	(United States) Steve Buckner	$690,000
3rd	(Germany) Michael Gathy	$505,000
4th	(United States) Brian Kim	$377,000
5th	(United States) Albert Calderon	$283,000
6th	(United States) David Kim	$216,000

=== Seminole Rock 'N' Roll Poker Open ===
- Casino: Seminole Hard Rock Hotel & Casino, Hollywood, Florida
- Buy-in: $3,500
- 5-Day Event: November 25–30, 2022
- Number of Entries: 1,431
- Total Prize Pool: $4,931,200
- Number of Payouts: 193

Final Table
Place	Name	Prize
1st	(United Kingdom) Andrew Wilson	$785,800
2nd	(United States) Josh Kay	$525,000
3rd	(United States) Chad Eveslage	$390,000
4th	(United States) Brian Altman	$290,000
5th	(Lithuania) Gediminas Uselis	$219,000
6th	(United States) Robel Andemichael	$167,000

=== WPT World Championship at Wynn Las Vegas ===
- Casino: Wynn Las Vegas, Las Vegas, Nevada
- Buy-in: $10,400
- 5-Day Event: December 12–18, 2022
- Number of Entries: 2,960
- Total Prize Pool: $29,008,000
- Number of Payouts: 371

Final Table
Place	Name	Prize
1st	(Canada) Eliot Hudon	$4,136,000
2nd	(United Kingdom) Benny Glaser	$2,830,000
3rd	(United States) Jean-Claude Moussa	$2,095,000
4th	(United States) Adam Adler	$1,608,000
5th	(United States) Frank Funaro	$1,301,000
6th	(United States) Colton Blomberg	$1,001,050
