= Kevin Eyster =

American poker player

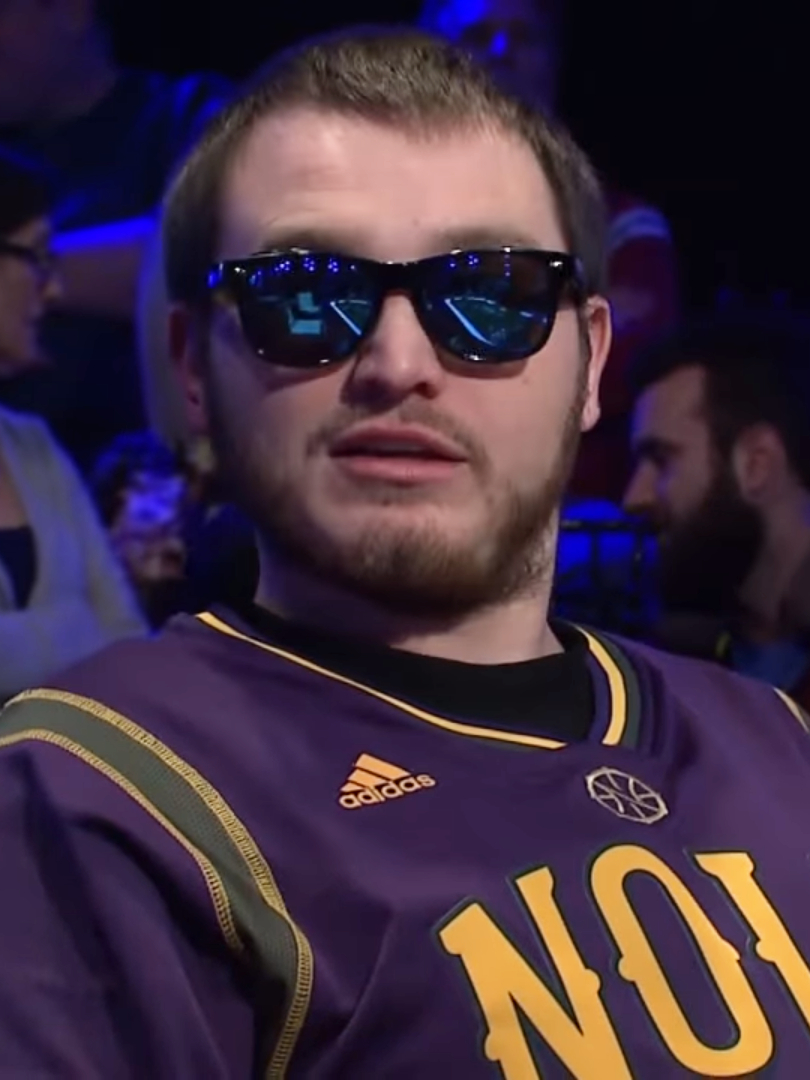
- Kevin Eyster in 2015
- Nickname: 1$ickDisea$E
- Born: 1989 (age 36–37); Lafayette, Louisiana, USA

World Series of Poker
- Bracelet: 1
- Final table: 1
- Money finishes: 11
- Highest WSOP Main Event finish: 204th, 2014

World Poker Tour
- Titles: 2
- Final tables: 2
- Money finishes: 13

European Poker Tour
- Title: None
- Money finishes: 3

Kevin Eyster or "1$ickDisea$E" is a professional poker player, born in Lafayette, Louisiana, United States. He learned the game at the age of 15 years during his schooldays. After graduating, he trained his skills mainly by playing online and in local games. He started his real poker career in 2007.

== Poker career ==
In 2009 Eyster moved from his hometown to Denver, from then he never went back. Eyster has an impressive number of poker cashes for his eight years of playing. He has participated and cashed from all main poker circuits. First cash dates back in 2007. Then in January 2010, Eyster suddenly marks a second place in the PCA, winning $65,765. In April 2010, he was already playing in the EPT San Remo Main Event, he finished 133rd for €9,000. Just few days after he cashed €60,000 from the EPT Monte Carlo Main Event, for his 16th position. Since then he cashed in 3 more EPT events.

He has 21 recorded WSOP cashes, 10 of which came from WSOP Circuit. His first record dates back in September 2010, when he finished 8th in WSOP Europe High Roller event for £47,045. In June 2014, he won his first WSOP bracelet in No Limit Hold'em - Six Handed event and he took $622,998 home. On the topic he said, "This is what I've been dreaming about my whole life." This was not the first time that Eyster managed to make a big run in a Six Max event. In 2013, Kevin managed to run through one of the most talented poker players, before he finished 9th.

Eyster also plays a lot in the WPT circuit. He has 15 money finishes, including two WPT titles. In April 2013, he won the WPT Seminole Hard Rock Showdown Main Event for $660,395. He beat a 532-entrant field on his way to the final table, where he was heads-up with Rubens Tarzia Eyster claimed his 2nd WPT title when he won the WPT Five Diamond World Poker Classic Main Event at the Bellagio in Vegas in December 2015 for his largest score ever of $1,587,382. Another big event from his career is the No Limit Hold'em 6 Max, played in Winstar, Thackerville, Oklahoma, where he finished 3rd for $219,088. He was eliminated by Travis Rice.

As of January 2018, his earnings exceeded $4,350,062.
