= Vivek Rajkumar =

Indian American poker player

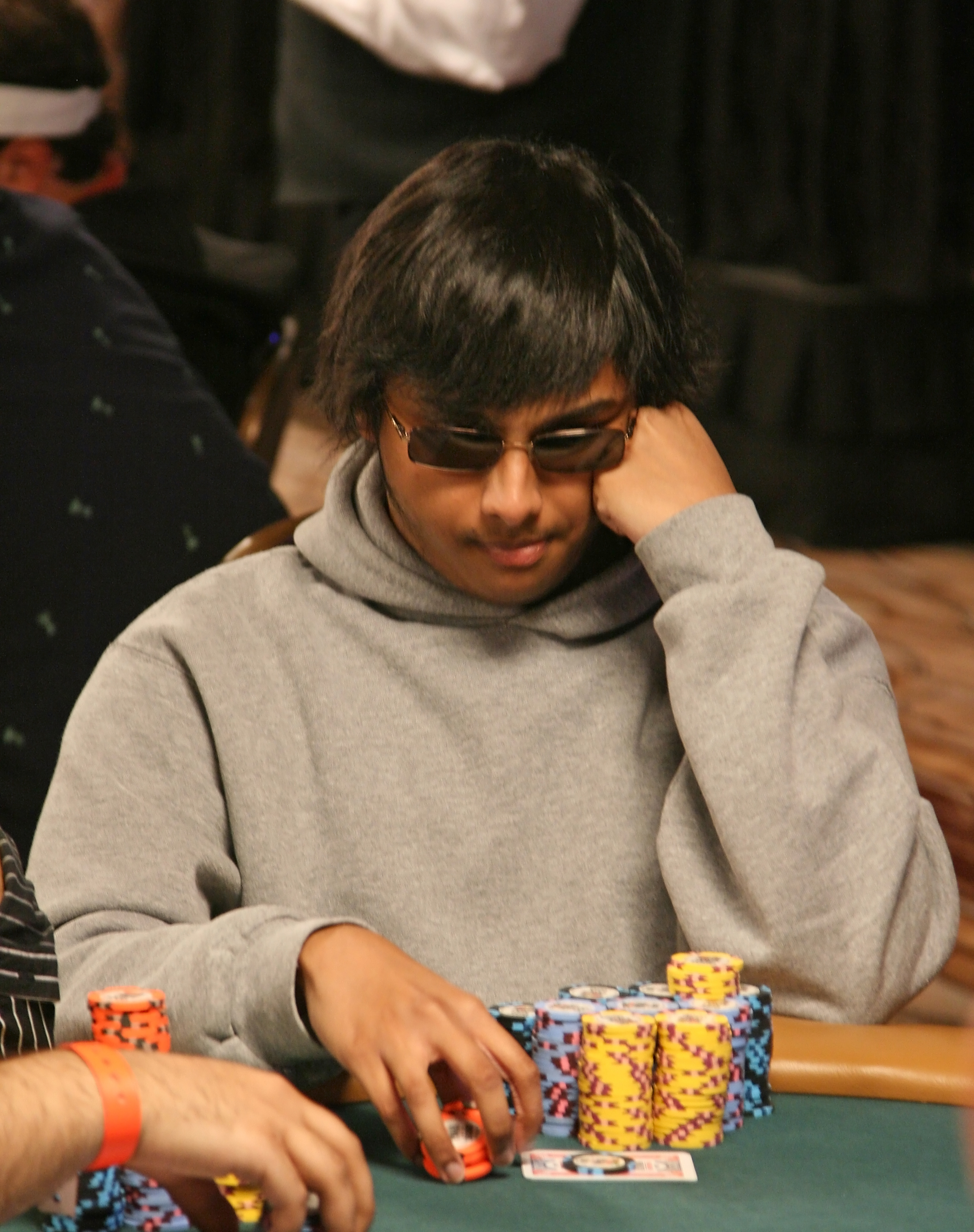
- Vivek Rajkumar at 2008 World Series of Poker

World Series of Poker
- Bracelet: None
- Money finishes: 14
- Highest WSOP Main Event finish: 197th, 2013, 2015

World Poker Tour
- Title: 1
- Final tables: 3
- Money finishes: 10

European Poker Tour
- Title: None
- Final table: None
- Money finish: 1

Vivek Rajkumar is a former professional poker player.

== Early life ==
Rajkumar was born in India and grew up in Singapore and Seattle. He graduated with a degree in Computer Engineering.

== Career ==
Rajkumar has interests in social media, gaming, hard technology, and sports betting. He partners with entrepreneurs at the earliest stage, often when they are just at the idea stage.

Rajkumar has also been involved in tournament poker. In 2008, he won the World Poker Tour Borgata Poker Open Main Event. He won two notable hands as a big underdog - once with pocket Tens versus pocket Aces before the flop (18% chance of winning), and the final hand with Ace Jack versus Ace Queen (26% chance of winning). The loss of either hand would have resulted in him being knocked out of the tournament. He has also won smaller field events including the 2008 LA Poker Classic $2,500 No Limit Hold'em event and the 2009 L.A. Poker Classic $9,900 No Limit Hold'em event. However, since 2019, he has not been involved in poker.
