= Mohsin Charania =

American poker player (born 1985)

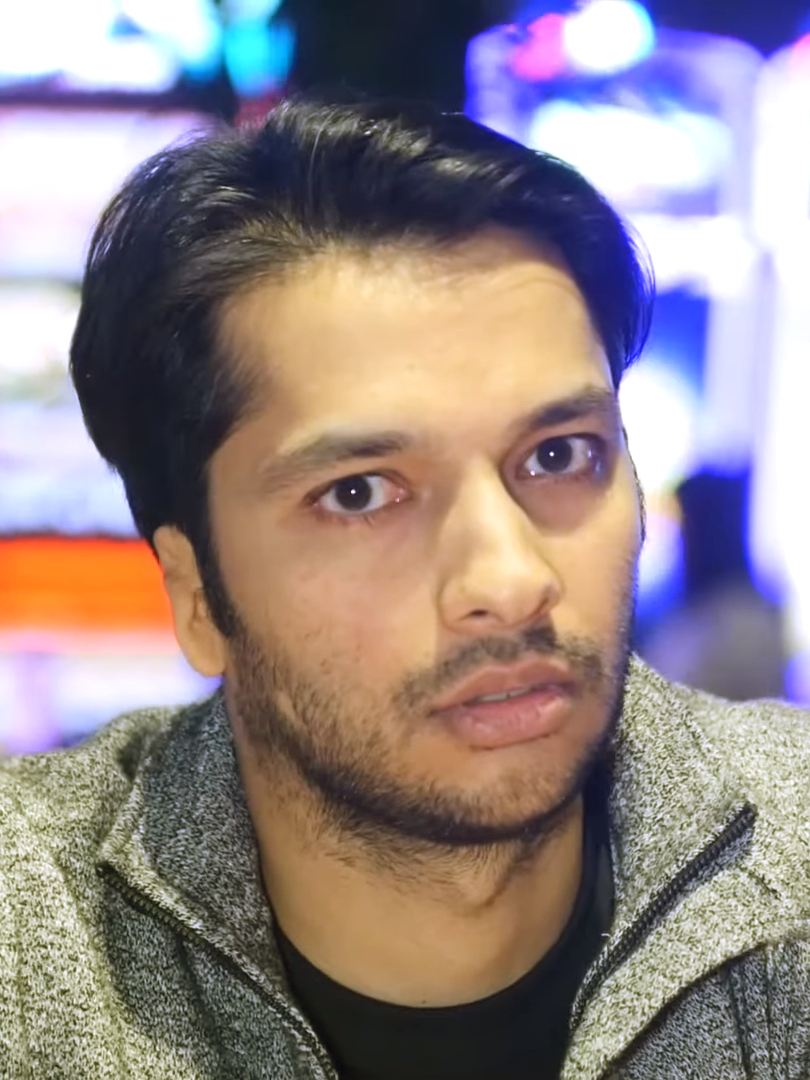
- Mohsin Charania in 2019
- Nickname: chicagocards1
- Born: February 27, 1985 (age 41)

World Series of Poker
- Bracelet: 1
- Final tables: 3
- Money finishes: 44
- Highest WSOP Main Event finish: 35th, 2020

World Poker Tour
- Titles: 2
- Final tables: 6
- Money finishes: 28

European Poker Tour
- Title: 1
- Final table: 1
- Money finishes: 5

Mohsin Charania (born February 27, 1985) is a professional poker player from Chicago, Illinois who has won titles at the World Series of Poker, the World Poker Tour, and the European Poker Tour.

Charania briefly worked as a financial analyst for J.P. Morgan. His first major poker title came in 2012 at the EPT Grand Final in Monte Carlo, where he won €1,350,000. On the WPT Charania has 25 cashes and made five final tables. In 2013, he won his first WPT title at the Grand Prix de Paris. His second WPT win came in 2014 at the Five Diamond World Poker Classic, earning $1,177,890.

Charania first cashed at the WSOP in 2009. In total he has 43 cashes and made three final tables. In 2017 he won his first WSOP bracelet in a $1,500 No Limit Hold'em event. The win allowed him to complete poker's Triple Crown, becoming the sixth player to accomplish the feat.

Playing under the names "chicagocards1" and "sms9231", Charania has online winnings of nearly $6,000,000. In 2010 he won a Spring Championship of Online Poker event.

As of 2017, Charania's total live winnings exceed $5,618,000. His WSOP cashes account for $807,000 of those earnings.

== World Series of Poker bracelets ==
Year	Tournament	Prize (US$)
2017	$1,500 No Limit Hold'em	$364,438
