= World Series of Poker Circuit =

Series of poker tournaments

The World Series of Poker Circuit is a series of poker tournaments held annually at a variety of casinos since 2005 as a build-up to the World Series of Poker (WSOP).

All Championship events are competed in no limit Texas hold 'em; preliminary events may be different poker variants.

In 2015, the WSOP International Circuit was launched, with rounds in Canada, Latin America, the Caribbean, Europe, Asia-Pacific and Africa. The International Circuit has expanded to 13 tournaments for the 2017/18 season.

== WSOP Circuit bracelets ==
=== WSOP Circuit National Championship ===
Starting in 2010–11, the WSOP Circuit National Championship was held as a closed event for participants of various circuit events. The winner of the WSOP Circuit National Championship won a World Series of Poker bracelet.

Starting in 2011–12, qualification for the WSOP Circuit National Championship was significantly changed. A total of 100 players now receive automatic seats in the WSOP Circuit National Championship. The winners of each Circuit main event and the highest point earner at each circuit stop receive seats, with the remaining automatic seats filled by the top points earners throughout the Circuit season who are not already qualified. Additionally, the top 100 players in the "WSOP World Rankings", a points race determined on results in open events of the previous two WSOPs, are eligible to enter. The Circuit qualifiers play the National Championship on a freeroll, while the WSOP World Rankings qualifiers must pay a $10,000 buy-in.

Date	Location	Entries	Prize Pool	Winner	Prize	Runner-up	Results
2010–11; May 29, 2011	WSOPC National Championship; Caesars Palace	100	$1,000,000	(United States) Sam Barnhart	$300,000	(United States) James Anderson	
2011-12; July 8, 2012	WSOPC National Championship; Rio All-Suite Hotel & Casino	157	$1,570,000	(United States) Ryan Eriquezzo	$416,051	(United States) Nikolas Stone	
2012-13; May 24, 2013	WSOPC National Championship; Harrah's New Orleans	127	$1,270,000	(United States) Jonathan Hilton	$355,599	(United States) Max Steinberg	
2013-14; May 24, 2014	WSOPC National Championship; Bally's Casino Atlantic City	126	$1,260,000	(Germany) Dominik Nitsche	$352,800	(United States) Athanasios Polychronopoulos	
2014-15; July 31, 2015	WSOPC National Championship; Harrah's Cherokee	122	$1,220,000	(United States) Loni Harwood	$341,599	(United States) Alexandru Masek	

=== WSOP Global Casino Championship ===
In 2015–16, the WSOP National Championship was renamed to the WSOP Global Casino Championship, featuring the winners from both WSOP Circuit and WSOP International Circuit. The winner of the WSOP Global Casino Championship won a World Series of Poker bracelet.

Date	Location	Entries	Prize Pool	Winner	Prize	Runner-up	Results
2015–16; August 11, 2016	WSOPC Global Casino Championship; Harrah's Cherokee	126	$1,260,000	(France) Said El-Yousfi	$343,256	(United States) Yasin Ahmady	
2016–17; August 10, 2017	WSOPC Global Casino Championship; Harrah's Cherokee	124	$1,090,000	(South Korea) Sean Yu	$296,941	(Russia) Alexander Lakhov	
2017–18; August 9, 2018	WSOPC Global Casino Championship; Harrah's Cherokee	127	$1,050,000	(United States) Warren Sheaves	$282,113	(United States) Jeremy Meacham	
2018–19; August 8, 2019	WSOPC Global Casino Championship; Harrah's Cherokee	129	$1,040,000	(United States) Ryan Eriquezzo	$279,431	(United States) Eric Salazar	
2019–20; September 13, 2020	WSOPC Global Casino Championship; WSOP.com ONLINE	130	$1,070,000	(United States) Andrew Kelsall	$275,632	(United States) Michael Trivett	
2020–21	season not held						

=== WSOP Tournament of Champions ===
Non-bracelet event.

Date	Location	Entries	Prize Pool	Winner	Prize	Runner-up	Results
2003-04; September 1, 2004	WSOP Tournament of Champions; Rio All-Suite Hotel & Casino	10	$2,000,000	(United States) Annie Duke	$2,000,000	(United States) Phil Hellmuth Jr.	
2004-05; November 8, 2005	WSOP Tournament of Champions; Caesars Palace Las Vegas	114	$2,000,000	(United States) Mike Matusow	$1,000,000	(United States) Hoyt Corkins	
2005-06; June 25, 2006	WSOP Tournament of Champions; Rio All-Suite Hotel & Casino	27	$2,000,000	(United States) Mike Sexton	$1,000,000	(United States) Daniel Negreanu	
2007–2009	event not held						
2009-10; July 4, 2010	WSOP Tournament of Champions; Rio All-Suite Hotel & Casino	27	$1,000,000	(United States) Huck Seed	$500,000	(United States) Howard Lederer	
2011–2021	event not held						
2021–22; July 20, 2022	WSOP Tournament of Champions; Horseshoe Las Vegas	470	$1,000,000	(United States) Benjamin Kaupp	$250,000	(United States) Raul Garza	
2022–23; June 2, 2023	WSOP Tournament of Champions; Horseshoe Las Vegas	741	$1,000,000	(United States) Ronnie Day	$200,000	(United States) Kenneth Gregory	
2023–24; May 24, 2024	WSOP Tournament of Champions; Commerce Casino Los Angeles	562	$1,000,000	(China) Dong Meng	$200,000	(United States) Kevin Will	
2024–25; May 17, 2025	WSOP Tournament of Champions; Commerce Casino Los Angeles	485	$1,000,000	(Canada) Kevin Li	$200,000	(United States) Shawn Rice	

== WSOP Circuit rings ==
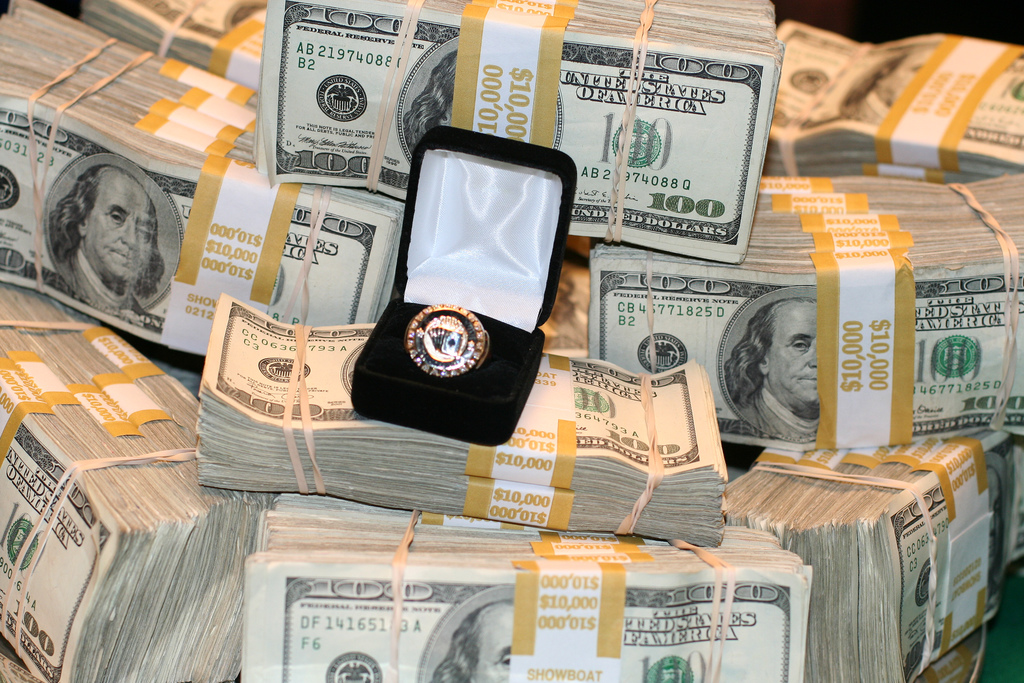
WSOP Circuit ring

Like the World Series of Poker and its prestigious bracelet, all circuit stops have preliminary events that award rings as well.

In March 2018, WSOP.com in New Jersey hosted the first online poker tournament to award a Circuit ring.

=== WSOP Circuit ring winners ===
Below is a list of the top-ten poker players with the most World Series of Poker (WSOP) Circuit rings.

Information correct as of 21 April 2025.

Rings	Player	Bracelets
19	(Canada) Ari Engel	4
19	(United States) Maurice Hawkins	0
18	(United States) Daniel Lowery	0
17	(United States) Michael Lavin	1
16	(United States) Joshua Reichard	1
16	(United States) Michael Setera	1
14	(United States) Soheb Porbandarwala	1
14	(Romania) Valentin Vornicu	0
11	(United States) Richard Ali	1
11	(Georgia (country)) Roland Israelashvili	1

=== Most WSOP Circuit Rings in Shortest Period of Time ===
In July 2022, Sergio Ramirez became the first player to win 4 WSOP Circuit rings in 12 days: $500 PLO WSOPC Online (July 15), $600 PLO WSOPC Choctaw (July 19), $400 NLHE WSOPC Choctaw (July 25), and $400 NLHE WSOPC Choctaw (July 26)

== WSOP Circuit Main Event Winners ==
The World Series of Poker Circuit now has 22 stops along the national tour. Each stop ends with a $1,675 buy-in Main Event. Originally they were $10,000. However, it changed rapidly with each succeeding WSOP Circuit season.

=== 2005 season ===
Date	Location	Entries	Prize Pool	Winner	Prize	Runner-up	Results
January 18, 2005	(United States) Atlantic City; Harrah's Atlantic City	249	$2,365,500	(Canada) Nghi Tran	$780,615	(United States) Erick Lindgren	
March 2, 2005	(United States) Southern California; Harrah's Rincon	209	$1,985,500	(United States) Chris Ferguson	$655,220	(United States) Prahlad Friedman	
March 23, 2005	(United States) Las Vegas; Rio Casino Las Vegas	222	$2,109,000	(Canada) Doug Lee	$695,970	(United States) Jennifer Harman	
May 8, 2005	(United States) Nevada; Harrah's Lake Tahoe	173	$1,643,500	(Australia) Jeff Lisandro	$542,360	(United States) Phil Ivey	
May 28, 2005	(United States) New Orleans; Harrah's New Orleans	259	$2,460,500	(United States) Walter Chambers	$787,340	(United States) Corey Bierria	

=== 2005–06 season ===
Date	Location	Entries	Prize Pool	Winner	Prize	Runner-up	Results
August 25, 2005	(United States) Mississippi; Grand Casino Tunica	179	$1,736,300	(United States) Gregg Merkow	$561,175	(United States) Robert Law	
September 16, 2005	(United States) Las Vegas; Harrah's Las Vegas	107	$1,005,800	(United States) Chris Ferguson	$362,088	(United States) Chade Layne	
November 2, 2005	(United States) Southern Indiana; Caesars Indiana	127	$1,216,000	(United States) Vinny Vinh	$437,760	(United States) Men Nguyen	
November 22, 2005	(United States) Las Vegas; Paris Las Vegas	134	$1,259,600	(United States) Thang Pham	$453,456	(United States) J. C. Tran	
December 9, 2005	(United States) Atlantic City; Showboat Atlantic City	96	$931,200	(United States) Chris Reslock	$335,235	(Indonesia) John Juanda	
January 26, 2006	(United States) Mississippi; Grand Casino Tunica	241	$2,289,500	(Canada) Daniel Negreanu	$755,525	(United States) Bryant King	
February 17, 2006	(United States) Atlantic City; Harrah's Atlantic City	124	$1,202,800	(United States) Abraham Korotki	$433,008	(Denmark) Brian Jensen	
March 7, 2006	(United States) Southern California; Harrah's Rincon	109	$1,035,500	(United States) Darrell Dicken	$372,780	(United States) Weikai Chang	
March 31, 2006	(United States) Atlantic City; Caesars Atlantic City	99	$960,300	(United States) Jeffrey King	$345,708	(United States) Rep Porter	
May 11, 2006	(United States) Las Vegas; Caesars Palace	209	$1,964,600	(United States) John Spadavecchia	$648,320	(United States) Sean McCabe	
May 28, 2006	(United States) New Orleans; Harrah's New Orleans	170	$1,615,000	(United States) Peter Feldman	$532,950	(Canada) Gavin Smith	
June 19, 2006	(United States) Nevada; Harrah's Lake Tahoe	110	$1,034,000	(United States) Clint Baskin	$372,240	(United States) Brian Fidler	

=== 2006–07 season ===
Date	Location	Entries	Prize Pool	Winner	Prize	Runner-up	Results
September 17, 2006	(United States) Nevada; Harrah's Lake Tahoe	127	$615,950	(United States) Michael Arents	$196,005	(United States) Jerry Renfroe	
October 4, 2006	(United States) Mississippi; Grand Casino Tunica	197	$955,450	(United States) Mark Smith	$306,003	(United States) Manelic Minaya	
November 3, 2006	(United States) Southern Indiana; Caesars Indiana	196	$819,650	(United States) Chad Batista	$262,002	(United States) Hoyt Lance	
December 19, 2006	(United States) Atlantic City; Harrah's Atlantic City	237	$1,161,300	(United States) Rick Rossetti	$379,096	(Brazil) Alexandre Gomes	
January 17, 2007	(United States) Mississippi; Grand Casino Tunica	377	$1,817,450	(United States) Dennis Perry	$563,402	(United States) Gioi Luong	
February 7, 2007	(United States) Omaha/Iowa; Horseshoe Council Bluffs	142	$688,700	(United States) Kosta Sengos	$219,576	(United States) Paul Kraus	
February 22, 2007	(United States) Southern California; Harrah's Rincon	181	$877,850	(United States) Peter Feldman	$280,859	(Canada) David Matthew	
March 14, 2007	(United States) Atlantic City; Caesars Atlantic City	314	$1,538,600	(United States) Danny Yousefzadeh	$488,828	(United States) John McMahon	
April 6, 2007	(United States) Southern Indiana; Caesars Indiana	154	$736,900	(United States) Men Nguyen	$238,756	(United States) Young Phan	
May 2, 2007	(United States) Las Vegas; Caesars Las Vegas	336	$1,335,272	(Canada) Cory Carroll	$515,176	(United States) Justin Pechie	
May 23, 2007	(United States) New Orleans; Harrah's New Orleans	346	$1,667,100	(United States) Lou Esposito	$516,801	(United States) Clint Schafer	

=== 2007–08 season ===
Date	Location	Entries	Prize Pool	Winner	Prize	Runner-up	Results
September 13, 2007	(United States) Mississippi; Grand Casino Tunica	138	$669,300	(United States) Jordan Morgan	$216,852	(United States) Terry Hawkins	
November 2, 2007	(United States) Southern Indiana; Caesars Indiana	144	$688,401	(United States) Carlos Uz	$223,042	(United States) Marc Fratter	
November 18, 2007	(United States) Nevada; Harrah's Lake Tahoe	142	$677,928	(United States) Chris Ferguson	$203,649	(United States) Dustin Fox	
December 5, 2007	(United States) New Orleans; Harrah's New Orleans	160	$765,000	(United States) Andy Philachack	$247,860	(United States) Josh Arieh	
December 16, 2007	(United States) Atlantic City; Harrah's Atlantic City	244	$1,195,600	(United States) John Racener	$379,392	(United States) Eric Buchman	
January 22, 2008	(United States) Mississippi; Grand Casino Tunica	180	$1,350,000	(Canada) Bart Tichelman	$425,595	(United States) Donald Nicholson	
February 7, 2008	(United States) Southern California; Harrah's Rincon	148	$706,800	(United States) Mike Pickett	$229,002	(United States) David Peters	
February 27, 2008	(United States) Omaha/Iowa; Horseshoe Council Bluffs	99	$484,137	(United States) Benjamin Hock	$169,327	(United States) Michael Martin	
March 15, 2008	(United States) Atlantic City; Caesars Atlantic City	277	$1,357,000	(United States) Eric Haber	$431,136	(United States) Dan Hicks	
April 6, 2008	(United States) Southern Indiana; Caesars Indiana	117	$556,450	(United States) Wilbur Futhey	$180,290	(United States) Steve Merrifield	
May 1, 2008	(United States) Las Vegas; Caesars Palace	334	$1,670,000	(United States) Allen Cunningham	$499,162	(United States) Benjamin Fineman	
May 21, 2008	(United States) New Orleans; Harrah's New Orleans	249	$1,196,654	(United States) Nick Ceci	$382,928	(United States) Timothy Miles	

=== 2008–09 season ===
Date	Location	Entries	Prize Pool	Winner	Prize	Runner-up	Results
October 14, 2008	(United States) Southern Indiana; Horseshoe Southern Indiana	84	$420,000	(United States) Samuel Oberlin	$143,064	(United States) Jerry Martin	
November 2, 2008	(United States) Chicago; Horseshoe Casino Hammond	165	$800,250	(United States) Steve Billirakis	$208,885	(United States) Thomas Koral	
November 16, 2008	(United States) Nevada; Harveys Lake Tahoe	132	$640,200	(United States) Michael Binger	$181,379	(United States) Tyrone Stewart	
December 16, 2008	(United States) Atlantic City; Harrah's Atlantic City	179	$867,100	(United States) Brent Roberts	$280,040	(United States) Phillip Reed	
February 2, 2009	(United States) Mississippi; Harrah's Casino Tunica	154	$735,900	(United States) Kai Landry	$183,974	(United States) David Dao	
February 25, 2009	(United States) Omaha/Iowa; Horseshoe Council Bluffs	67	$313,950	(United States) Jesse Hale	$113,020	(United States) Dennis Meierotto	
March 14, 2009	(United States) Atlantic City; Caesars Atlantic City	208	$1,009,200	(Canada) Sam Chartier	$322,944	(Canada) John Nixon	
April 1, 2009	(United States) Southern California; Harrah's Rincon	106	$503,100	(United States) Dwyte Pilgrim	$125,775	(United States) Esther Taylor	
April 30, 2009	(United States) Las Vegas; Caesars Palace	187	$896,950	(United States) Justin Bonomo	$227,692	(United States) Michael Mizrachi	
May 20, 2009	(United States) New Orleans; Harrah's New Orleans	167	$798,950	(United States) Jean Gaspard	$211,722	(United States) Billy Kopp	

=== 2009–10 season ===
Date	Location	Entries	Prize Pool	Winner	Prize	Runner-up	Results
October 25, 2009	(United States) Chicago; Horseshoe Hammond	248	$1,190,800	(United States) Daniel Livingston	$291,749	(United States) Thanasi Floros	
November 2, 2009	(United States) Southern Indiana; Horseshoe Southern Indiana	55	$275,000	(United States) Gabriel Cook	$92,430	(United States) Chris Tryba	
November 17, 2009	(United States) Nevada; Harveys Lake Tahoe	64	$299,400	(United States) Matt Keikoan	$106,435	(United States) Justin Hallstrom	
December 15, 2009	(United States) Atlantic City; Harrah's Atlantic City	195	$926,835	(United States) Chris Klodnicki	$215,915	(United States) Kyle Bowker	
February 10, 2010	(United States) Mississippi; Harrah's Casino Tunica	95	$449,750	(United States) Paul Wasicka	$139,422	(United States) Larry Gurney	
March 2, 2010	(United States) Omaha/Iowa; Horseshoe Council Bluffs	46	$212,110	(United States) Jovan Sudar	$95,455	(United States) Gerald Walter	
March 14, 2010	(United States) Atlantic City; Caesars Atlantic City	174	$817,019	(Georgia (country)) Roland Israelashvili	$264,715	(United States) Chris Mitchell	
March 31, 2010	(United States) Southern California; Harrah's Rincon	70	$328,500	(United States) Bryan Devonshire	$114,975	(United States) Daniel Schreiber	
April 15, 2010	(United States) Missouri; Harrah's St. Louis	129	$625,650	(United States) Jeffrey Roper	$170,814	(United States) Jason Mo	
April 30, 2010	(United States) Las Vagas; Caesars Palace	150	$717,500	(United States) Andrew Lichtenberger	$190,137	(United States) Dan Casetta	
May 19, 2010	(United States) New Orleans; Harrah's New Orleans	156	$745,600	(United States) Fred Berger	$197,584	(United States) Mike Beasley	

=== 2010–11 season ===
Date	Location	Entries	Prize Pool	Winner	Prize	Runner-up	Results
August 31, 2010	(United States) Omaha/Iowa; Horseshoe Council Bluffs	251	$365,205	(United States) Blair Hinkle	$88,566	(United States) Shiva Dudani	
October 12, 2010	(United States) Southern Indiana; Horseshoe Southern Indiana	289	$416,160	(United States) Charles Moore	$98,878	(United States) Kevin Calenzo	
October 22, 2010	(United States) Regional Championship; Horseshoe Hammond	872	$1,245,680	(United States) Kurt Jewell	$242,909	(United States) Jared Kenworthy	
October 31, 2010	(South Africa) South Africa; Emerald Resort & Casino	188	$866,542	(South Africa) Warren Zackey	$222,477	(South Africa) Melanie Banfield	
November 9, 2010	(United States) Biloxi/Mississippi; IP Casino Biloxi	270	$392,850	(United States) Travis Lutes	$95,253	(United States) Farid Nasserazad	
November 10, 2010	(United States) Nevada; Harveys Lake Tahoe	246	$357,930	(United States) Stanley Quinn	$86,789	(United States) John Mcneilly	
December 12, 2010	(United States) Atlantic City; Harrah's Atlantic City	352	$512,160	(United States) Matt Waxman	$117,797	(United States) Ismael Cabrera	
December 22, 2010	(United States) Regional Championship; Harrah's Atlantic City	136	$1,279,624	(United States) Chris Bell	$358,295	(United States) Chris Klodnicki	
January 24, 2011	(United States) Dallas/Oklahoma; Choctaw Casinos Durant	808	$1,175,640	(United States) Huy Nguyen	$232,706	(United States) Traci Brown	
February 15, 2011	(United States) Mississippi; Harrah's Casino Tunica	480	$698,400	(United States) Sam Barnhart	$148,612	(United States) Jesse White	
March 1, 2011	(United States) Florida; Palm Beach Kennel Club	742	$1,025,280	(United States) John Riordan	$210,180	(United States) Mike Morton	
March 13, 2011	(United States) Atlantic City; Caesars Atlantic City	442	$643,110	(United States) Brian Ali	$139,284	(United States) John Andress	
March 26, 2011	(United States) Southern California; Harrah's Rincon	188	$270,720	(United States) Seneca Easley	$70,384	(United States) Shaun Walker	
March 30, 2011	(United States) Regional Championship; Harrah's Rincon	98	$950,600	(United States) Ali Eslami	$282,242	(United States) Tim West	
April 12, 2011	(United States) Missouri; Harrah's St. Louis	449	$646,762	(United States) Kyle Cartwright	$142,290	(United States) Asheesh Boyapati	
April 30, 2011	(United States) Las Vegas; Caesars Palace	496	$714,240	(United States) Chris Johnson	$153,559	(United States) Brian England	
May 10, 2011	(United States) Philadelphia; Harrah's Philadelphia	269	$391,395	(United States) Kenny Nguyen	$94,901	(United States) Robert Scott	
May 18, 2011	(United States) New Orleans; Harrah's New Orleans	382	$550,080	(United States) Jonathan Poche	$121,017	(United States) Robert Toye	
May 22, 2011	(United States) Regional Championship; Harrah's New Orleans	75	$698,400	(United States) A.J. Jejelowo	$235,956	(United States) Gary Friedlander	

=== 2011–12 season ===
Date	Location	Entries	Prize Pool	Winner	Prize	Runner-up	Results
September 19, 2011	(United States) Louisiana; Horseshoe Bossier City	475	$691,125	(United States) David Nicholson	$148,590	(United States) David Olson	
October 10, 2011	(United States) Southern Indiana; Horseshoe Southern Indiana	313	$455,415	(United States) Robert Castoire	$107,023	(United States) Jake Bazeley	
October 24, 2011	(United States) Chicago; Horseshoe Hammond	1,615	$2,349,825	(United States) Robert Chow	$393,584	(United States) Aaron Steury	
November 7, 2011	(United States) Biloxi/Mississippi; IP Casino Biloxi	337	$490,335	(United States) Jerry Monroe	$112,779	(United States) William Phillips	
November 22, 2011	(United States) Nevada; Harveys Lake Tahoe	327	$475,785	(United States) Bryan Schultz	$111,812	(United States) Daniel Lowery	
December 12, 2011	(United States) Atlantic City; Harrah's Atlantic City	618	$889,061	(United States) Tuan Phan	$188,190	(United States) Hao Le	
January 13, 2012	(United States) California; The Bicycle Casino	549	$798,795	(Lebanon) Kassem Deeb	$171,810	(United States) Alexandru Masek	
January 23, 2012	(United States) Dallas/Oklahoma; Choctaw Casinos Durant	978	$1,422,990	(United States) Abraham Araya	$270,380	(United States) Daniel Lowery	
January 30, 2012	(United States) Las Vegas; Caesars Palace	662	$963,210	(United States) Kevin Calenzo	$197,451	(United States) Ian Mack	
February 13, 2012	(United States) Mississippi; Harrah's Casino Tunica	647	$941,385	(United States) Kurt Jewell	$192,984	(United States) Christopher Thompson	
February 27, 2012	(United States) Florida; Palm Beach Kennel Club	778	$1,131,990	(Canada) James Harnden	$226,395	(United States) Rob Williamson	
February 26, 2012	(South Africa) South Africa; Emerald Resort & Casino	218	$634,380	(South Africa) Joe-Boy Rahme	$158,595	(South Africa) Ivan Pakkiri	
March 12, 2012	(United States) Atlantic City; Caesars Atlantic City	635	$932,655	(United States) Ryan Eriquezzo	$191,194	(United States) David Zeitlin	
March 26, 2012	(United States) Southern California; Harrah's Rincon	332	$483,060	(United States) Joe Kuether	$111,104	(United States) Christopher Cronin	
April 9, 2012	(United States) Omaha/Iowa; Horseshoe Council Bluffs	290	$421,950	(United States) Michael Stanko	$101,266	(United States) Charles Moore	
April 23, 2012	(United States) Missouri; Harrah's St. Louis	625	$909,375	(United States) Tripp Kirk	$190,961	(United States) Tim Killday	
May 7, 2012	(United States) Philadelphia; Harrah's Philadelphia	321	$467,055	(United States) Christopher Bonn	$109,760	(United States) Kenneth Silberstein	
May 21, 2012	(United States) New Orleans; Harrah's New Orleans	694	$1,008,770	(United States) Justin Truesdell	$204,747	(United States) Andrew Nguyen	

=== 2012–13 season ===
Date	Location	Entries	Prize Pool	Winner	Prize	Runner-up	Results
August 20, 2012	IP Casino Biloxi	300	$450,000	(United States) Kyle Cartwright	$107,992	(United States) Brad Johnson	
September 24, 2012	Horseshoe Bossier City	405	$607,500	(United States) Jeffrey Gibralter	$133,648	(United States) Jay Diaz	
October 8, 2012	Horseshoe Southern Indiana	340	$510,000	(United States) Dan Heimiller	$117,300	(United States) Jonathan Taylor	
October 22, 2012	Horseshoe Hammond	1,523	$2,304,000	(United States) Joshua Williams	$385,909	(United States) Ryan Riess	
November 7, 2012	River Rock (Vancouver)	1,032	C$1,548,000	(Canada) John Crncic	C$286,382	(Canada) Ryan Biermann	
November 19, 2012	Harveys Lake Tahoe	422	$633,000	(United States) Cary Marshall	$139,260	(United States) Derrick Yamada	
December 10, 2012	Harrah's Atlantic City	616	$924,000	(United States) Adam Teasdale	$194,040	(United States) Wade Woelfel	
December 17, 2012	Harrah's Rincon	306	$459,000	(United States) Jonathan Chehanske	$107,862	(United States) Soi Nguyen	
January 14, 2013	The Bicycle Casino	721	$1,080,500	(United States) Baptiste Chavaillaz	$216,275	(China) Zhang Chen	
January 21, 2013	Choctaw Casinos Durant	1,140	$1,710,063	(United States) Jeffrey Fielder	$312,080	(United States) Matthew Kirby	
February 4, 2013	Harrah's Casino Tunica	666	$999,000	(United States) Ryan Stevenson	$204,795	(United States) Norman Mckeldin	
February 10, 2013	WSOP International Circuit; Emerald Casino (South Africa)	116	$337,560	(United States) Michael Mizrachi	$101,267	(South Africa) Karl Myburgh	
February 18, 2013	Caesars Palace	744	$1,116,000	(United States) David Tuthill	$223,197	(United States) Athipoo Phahurat	
February 25, 2013	Palm Beach Kennel Club	670	$1,005,000	(United States) Jonathan Tamayo	$206,020	(United States) Clint Tolbert	
March 11, 2013	Caesars Atlantic City	540	$810,000	(United States) Joe McKeehen	$174,147	(United States) Tony Sinishtaj	
March 25, 2013	The Lodge Casino (Black Hawk)	421	$631,500	(United States) Jonathan Taylor	$138,938	(United States) Kevin Eyster	
April 8, 2013	Foxwoods Resort Casino	615	$924,692	(United States) Kevin Saul	$194,178	(United States) Lall Bharat	
April 15, 2013	Harrah's Cherokee	856	$1,284,000	(United States) John Bowman	$250,380	(United States) Daniel Weinman	
April 22, 2013	Horseshoe Council Bluffs	367	$550,800	(United States) Blair Hinkle	$121,177	(United States) Brendan Waite	
May 6, 2013	Harrah's Philadelphia	351	$526,500	(United States) Rex Clinkscales	$121,095	(United States) Michael Jukich	
May 20, 2013	Harrah's New Orleans	762	$1,143,000	(United States) Luke Graham	$228,600	(United States) Joseph Hebert	

=== 2013–14 season ===
Date	Location	Entries	Prize Pool	Winner	Prize	Runner-up	Results
August 19, 2013	Foxwoods Resort Casino	591	$888,568	(United States) Jason Strasser	$186,600	(United States) Wes Wyvill	
September 15, 2013	IP Casino Biloxi	302	$453,000	(United States) Martin Zentner	$106,455	(United States) John Sitton	
September 15, 2013	Horseshoe Cincinnati	740	$1,110,000	(United States) Bradford Albrinck	$221,994	(United States) David Kash	
October 14, 2013	Horseshoe Southern Indiana	301	$451,500	(United States) Zal Irani	$106,103	(United States) Michael Hahn	
October 28, 2013	Horseshoe Hammond	1,717	$2,575,500	(United States) James Dorrance	$418,526	(Mexico) David Cossio-Ruiz	
November 4, 2013	Harveys Lake Tahoe	390	$585,000	(United States) Daniel Harmetz	$128,699	(United States) Ryan Rinker	
November 7, 2013	River Rock (Vancouver)	865	C$1,297,500	(Canada) Lincoln Milne	C$253,015	(United States) Alex Toth	
November 17, 2013	Horseshoe Bossier City	438	$657,000	(United States) Thomas Creel	$144,537	(United States) Sean Small	
November 22, 2013	WSOP International Circuit; Casino du Lac-Leamy (Ottawa)	371	$556,500	(Canada) Charles Sylvestre	$122,435	(United States) John Nelson	
December 9, 2013	Harrah's Atlantic City	578	$867,000	(United States) Joseph Lapinta	$182,070	(United States) Joseph Wertz	
December 16, 2013	Harrah's Rincon	330	$495,000	(United States) Shahin Edalatdju	$116,325	(United States) Steven Firestone	
January 20, 2014	Choctaw Casinos Durant	1,428	$2,142,000	(United States) Tyler Morris	$369,503	(United States) Shelby Penka	
February 3, 2014	Harrah's Casino Tunica	577	$865,500	(United States) Jonathan Gaviao	$181,757	(United States) Carter Myers	
February 17, 2014	Palm Beach Kennel Club	658	$987,000	(United States) Ruslan Dykshteyn	$202,335	(United States) Vincent Maglio	
March 3, 2014	Caesars Palace	695	$1,045,500	(United States) Christian Pham	$214,332	(United States) Jonathan Gaviao	
March 19, 2014	The Bicycle Casino	756	$1,134,000	(India) Nipun Java	$226,785	(United States) Shane Schleger	
March 31, 2014	Lumière Place St. Louis	416	$624,000	(United States) Robert Panitch	$137,283	(United States) Robert Edelstein	
April 14, 2014	Harrah's Cherokee	665	$997,500	(United States) Jason Sandling	$204,487	(United States) William O'Neal	
April 21, 2014	Horseshoe Council Bluffs	247	$370,500	(United States) Blair Hinkle	$90,770	(United States) Matt Bond	
April 28, 2014	Harrah's Philadelphia	336	$504,000	(United States) Kyle Bowker	$115,920	(United States) Justin Liberto	
May 5, 2014	The Lodge Casino (Black Hawk)	330	$495,000	(United States) Eric Blair	$116,325	(United States) Nicholas Petitti	
May 19, 2014	Harrah's New Orleans	557	$835,500	(United States) Bryan Campanello	$175,459	(United States) Gary Friedlander	

=== 2014–15 season ===
Date	Location	Entries	Prize Pool	Winner	Prize	Runner-up	Results
August 11, 2014	Palm Beach Kennel Club	303	$454,500	(United States) Tristan Wade	$106,806	(United States) David Diaz	
August 25, 2014	Foxwoods Resort Casino	526	$790,031	(United States) Allen Kessler	$170,031	(United States) Mark Dube	
September 14, 2014	IP Casino Biloxi	301	$451,500	(United States) Mohammad Moeini	$106,101	(United States) Brandon Newsome	
October 13, 2014	Horseshoe Southern Indiana	360	$540,000	(United States) Gregory Johnson	$124,200	(United States) Russell Head	
October 27, 2014	Horseshoe Hammond	1,147	$1,720,500	(United States) Robert Coventry	$313,993	(United States) Viet Van Vo	
November 10, 2014	Harveys Lake Tahoe	380	$570,000	(United States) Jesse Wilke	$125,401	(United States) Barry Kay	
September 15, 2014	Planet Hollywood Las Vegas	1,044	$1,559,902	(England) John Eames	$289,706	(United States) Matt Berkey	
December 8, 2014	Harrah's Cherokee	797	$1,195,500	(United States) Jacob Bazeley	$239,096	(United States) Chad Deberry	
December 14, 2014	Harrah's Rincon	283	$424,500	(South Korea) Sean Yu	$101,881	(United States) Dan Stir	
December 22, 2014	Harrah's Atlantic City	460	$690,000	(United States) Mukul Pahuja	$148,345	(United States) Jacob Toole	
January 19, 2015	Choctaw Casinos Durant	1,363	$2,044,500	(United States) Jose Montes	$352,669	(United States) Benjamin Keeline	
February 2, 2015	Harrah's Casino Tunica	457	$685,000	(United States) Johnny Landreth	$147,388	(United States) Tommy Thomas	
August 11, 2014	Palm Beach Kennel Club	537	$805,500	(United States) Darryll Fish	$173,189	(United States) Diosdado Icawat	
March 2, 2015	Lumière Place St. Louis	415	$622,500	(United States) Joshua Turner	$136,945	(Spain) Javier Zarco	
March 2, 2015	Horseshoe Baltimore	670	$1,007,814	(United States) Christoph Csik	$206,020	(United States) Faisal Siddiqui	
March 15, 2015	WSOP International Circuit; Casino Marrakesh (Morocco)	484	€558,982	(France) Alain Manquant	€115,044	(France) Miroslav Alilovic	
March 15, 2015	The Bicycle Casino	669	$1,003,500	(United States) Gevork Kasabyan	$205,720	(United States) Adam Weinraub	
April 19, 2015	Horseshoe Council Bluffs	235	$352,500	(Taiwan) Yashuo Chin	$88,126	(United States) Mike Lang	
April 26, 2015	Harrah's Cherokee	786	$1,179,000	(United States) Ryan Jones	$235,804	(United States) David Williams	
May 11, 2015	Harrah's New Orleans	554	$831,000	(Serbia) Damjan Radanov	$147,514	(United States) David Nicholson	
May 24, 2015	Foxwoods Resort Casino	376	$565,315	(United States) David Kluchman	$124,370	(United States) Michael Thibeau	

=== 2015–16 season ===
Date	Location	Entries	Prize Pool	Winner	Prize	Runner-up	Results
August 15, 2015	Foxwoods Resort Casino	461	$693,113	(United States) Samuel Taylor	$149,020	(United States) Johanssy Joseph	
August 31, 2015	Horseshoe Baltimore	458	$687,000	(United States) Ting Xiao	$147,699	(United States) Sandeep Patel	
September 29, 2015	WSOP International Circuit; Casinò di Campione (Italy)	612	€531,970	(Italy) Sergio Castelluccio	€114,100	(Italy) Alessandro Vecchi	
September 29, 2015	Palm Beach Kennel Club	393	$589,501	(United States) Peter Vitantonio	$129,685	(Spain) Javier Zarco	
October 11, 2015	Horseshoe Southern Indiana	419	$561,000	(United States) Russell Head	$123,420	(United States) Abhishek Yerra	
October 25, 2015	Horseshoe Hammond	1,376	$2,064,000	(United States) Krzysztof Stybaniewicz	$356,043	(United States) Joe Kuether	
November 9, 2015	Harveys Lake Tahoe	476	$714,000	(United States) Robert Georato	$153,505	(United States) Patrick Rhamey	
November 9, 2015	WSOP International Circuit; King's Casino (Czech Rep.)	645	€1,021,911	(Poland) Dziewonski Mateusz	€206,927	(Republic of Ireland) Andrew King	
November 23, 2015	Planet Hollywood Las Vegas	1,304	$1,956,000	(United States) Sean Berrios	$347,192	(United States) Peter Hengsakul	
December 7, 2015	Harrah's Cherokee	1,010	$1,515,000	(United States) Daniel Weinman	$280,260	(United States) Edward LeBlanc	
December 15, 2015	The Bicycle Casino	641	$954,235	(Romania) Valentin Vornicu	$197,110	(United States) Michael Zelman	
January 18, 2016	Choctaw Casinos Durant	1,565	$2,347,500	(United States) Andy Philachack	$393,188	(United States) Jeffrey Landherr	
January 24, 2016	WSOP International Circuit; Casino Marrakesh (Morocco)	447	€465,603	(France) Mathieu Selides	€95,479	(Belgium) Anthony Rodrigues	
January 31, 2016	Harrah's Casino Tunica	646	$969,000	(United States) David Kruger	$198,657	(United States) Russell Head	
February 14, 2016	Palm Beach Kennel Club	613	$919,500	(United States) Mukul Pahuja	$193,095	(United States) Adam Levy	
March 7, 2016	Horseshoe Las Vegas	1,214	$1,821,000	(United States) Jason Wheeler	$323,236	(United States) Lisa Hamilton	
March 7, 2016	WSOP International Circuit; Tbilisi Sports Palace (Georgia)	390	$390,000	(United States) Brian Senie	$85,800	(Kazakhstan) Baurzhan Kazbekov	
March 26, 2016	Harrah's Atlantic City	370	$555,000	(United States) Robert Kuhn	$122,098	(United States) Nenad Cvetkovic	
March 27, 2016	The Bicycle Casino	756	$1,134,000	(Romania) Antonio Esfandiari	$226,785	(United States) Jamie Gold	
April 4, 2016	Horseshoe Baltimore	894	$1,500,000	(United States) Joseph Cappello	$292,500	(United States) Matt Bond	
April 11, 2016	Horseshoe Council Bluffs	321	$481,500	(United States) Maurice Hawkins	$113,152	(United States) Ryan Phan	
April 25, 2016	Harrah's Cherokee	1,008	$1,512,000	(United States) Maurice Hawkins	$279,722	(United States) Leif Force	
May 1, 2016	WSOP International Circuit; Montreal Casino (Canada)	520	C$780,000	(United States) Brian Altman	C$167,700	(Canada) Erik Lemarquand	
May 23, 2016	Harrah's New Orleans	785	$1,177,500	(United States) David Hubbard	$235,500	(United States) John Dollinger	

=== 2016–17 season ===
Date	Location	Entries	Prize Pool	Winner	Prize	Runner-up	Results
August 15, 2016	Harrah's Cherokee	804	$1,206,000	(United States) Steven Snyder	$241,198	(United States) Russell Sullivan	
August 29, 2016	Foxwoods Resort Casino	460	$690,000	(United States) Julian Sacks	$148,350	(United States) Travis Stams	
September 5, 2016	Planet Hollywood Las Vegas	528	$792,000	(South Korea) Sean Yu	$170,286	(United States) Eli Elezra	
September 18, 2016	IP Casino Biloxi	382	$573,000	(United States) Chris Savage	$126,059	(United States) Lytle Allen	
September 20, 2016	WSOP International Circuit; Casinò di Campione (Italy)	485	€376,360	(Italy) Matteo Mutti	€78,200	(Italy) Daniel Novak	
October 9, 2016	WSOP International Circuit; Spielbank Berlin (Germany)	398	€567,150	(New Zealand) David Yan	€124,635	(Poland) Marek Grzeska	
October 10, 2016	Caesars Southern Indiana	432	$647,994	(United States) Robert Hankins	$142,560	(United States) John Sitton III	
October 24, 2016	Horseshoe Hammond	1,308	$1,962,000	(United States) Dylan Linde	$348,269	(United States) Arif Rahim	
November 2, 2016	WSOP International Circuit; Hotel Transamerica (Brazil)	1,002	R$3,309,900	(Brazil) Francisco Moura	R$750,000	(Brazil) Marco Fernandes	
November 7, 2016	Harveys Lake Tahoe	475	$712,500	(United States) Michael Pearson	$153,191	(United States) Michael McDonough	
November 14, 2016	WSOP International Circuit; King's Casino (Czech Rep.)	851	€1,212,675	(Croatia) Ivan Banic	€232,241	(Israel) Yehuda Cohen	
November 16, 2016	Casino Royale (St. Maarten)	224	$336,000	(Canada) Timothy Cavallin	$84,000	(Italy) Luca Giovannone	
November 21, 2016	Palm Beach Kennel Club	261	$391,500	(United States) Maurice Hawkins	$95,921	(United States) Khoan Ho	
November 14, 2016	WSOP International Circuit; Club Montmartre (France)	957	€1,291,950	(France) Nicolas Noguera	€220,000	(France) Alexandre Yazdi	
December 5, 2016	Harrah's Cherokee	968	$1,452,000	(United States) Bradford Albrinck	$275,877	(United States) Jason Rivkin	
December 8, 2016	WSOP International Circuit; Enjoy Punta del Este (Uruguay)	697	$648,585	(Uruguay) Fabrizio Cataldi	$125,157	(Argentina) Alan Mehamed	
December 12, 2016	WSOP International Circuit; The Star, Sydney (Australia)	1,097	A$1,974,600	(Australia) Joel Dodds	A$360,364	(Hong Kong) Darwin Lai	
December 12, 2016	The Bicycle Casino	842	$1,263,000	(United States) Nikhil Gera	$246,295	(United States) Paul Nguyen	
January 22, 2017	WSOP International Circuit; Casino Marrakesh (Morocco)	511	$647,805	(England) Arron Fletcher	$136,001	(Spain) Pedro Rodero	
January 23, 2017	Choctaw Casinos Durant	1,451	$2,176,500	(United States) Grant Hinkle	$375,427	(United States) John Patterson	
January 30, 2017	Horseshoe Casino Tunica	610	$915,000	(United States) Neil Patel	$192,152	(United States) Cory Smith	
February 13, 2017	Potawatomi Casino	677	$1,015,500	(United States) Ala Aqel	$208,184	(United States) Chad Wiedenhoeft	
February 20, 2017	Palm Beach Kennel Club	524	$786,000	(United States) Raminder Singh	$168,995	(United States) Steven Stout	
February 27, 2017	Rio Casino Las Vegas	945	$1,417,500	(United States) Ryan Jones	$269,327	(United States) Muruz Yohannes	
March 15, 2017	The Bicycle Casino	705	$1,059,000	(United States) Dylan Wilkerson	$216,790	(England) Toby Lewis	
March 20, 2017	Harrah's Atlantic City	341	$511,500	(United States) Abraham Korotki	$117,645	(United States) Alexander Rocha	
March 27, 2017	Hard Rock Hotel & Casino Tulsa	574	$861,000	(United States) William Berry	$180,806	(United States) Daniel Lowery	
March 27, 2017	WSOP International Circuit; Casinò di Campione (Italy)	353	€308,169	(Italy) Andrea Benelli	€73,000	(England) Andrea Pezzoni	
April 9, 2017	Horseshoe Council Bluffs	271	$406,500	(United States) Maurice Hawkins	$97,561	(United States) William Perpich	
April 10, 2017	WSOP International Circuit; King's Casino (Czech Rep.)	651	€1,000,000	(Poland) Marcin Chmielewski	€183,350	(Slovenia) Boris Kotleba	
April 10, 2017	WSOP International Circuit; Le Croisette Cannes (France)	509	€659,664	(France) Didier Luel	€121,864	(Romania) Vlad Darie	
April 24, 2017	Harrah's Cherokee	1,164	$1,746,000	(United States) Vanessa Truong	$318,646	(United States) Daniel Pearlman	
May 7, 2017	WSOP International Circuit; Casino Estoril (Portugal)	469	€408,030	(Austria) Robert Auer	€87,725	(Portugal) Antonio Pedro	
May 8, 2017	Horseshoe Baltimore	449	$673,500	(United States) Mike Cordell	$148,171	(United States) Alexander Queen	
May 21, 2017	Harrah's New Orleans	758	$1,137,000	(United States) Jason Baldridge	$227,412	(United States) William Tait	
May 28, 2017	WSOP International Circuit; Grand Casino Brussels (Belgium)	293	€426,315	(Belgium) Pieyre Maggi	€100,000	(France) Alain Manquant	

=== 2017–18 season ===
Date	Location	Entries	Prize Pool	Winner	Prize	Runner-up	Results
August 6, 2017	WSOP International Circuit; City Center Iguazu (Argentina)	924	$785,400	(Brazil) Rafael Pandolfo	$140,050	(Argentina) Alejandro Sicuro	
August 13, 2017	Harrah's Cherokee	1,022	$1,553,000	(Armenia) Harut Arutyunyan	$283,597	(United States) Randy Lowery	
August 28, 2017	Foxwoods Resort Casino	486	$729,000	(United States) Jeremy Meacham	$156,735	(United States) Sean Thomson	
September 2, 2017	WSOP International Circuit; Holland Rotterdam (Netherlands)	273	$469,621	(Austria) Eyal Bensimhon	$112,709	(Germany) Jakob Miegel	
September 11, 2017	WSOP International Circuit; Casinò di Campione (Italy)	186	$216,069	(Italy) Salvatore Scrivo	$48,502	(Italy) Eugenio Peralta	
September 18, 2017	IP Casino Biloxi	343	$514,500	(United States) Kyle Cartwright	$118,332	(United States) Timothy Miles	
September 25, 2017	Thunder Valley Casino	528	$792,000	(United States) Nick Pupillo	$170,286	(United States) Dann Turner	
October 2, 2017	Seminole Hard Rock Hollywood	904	$1,356,000	(United States) Joseph Gotlieb	$257,638	(United States) Asher Conniff	
October 4, 2017	WSOP International Circuit; Hotel Transamerica (Brazil)	939	$940,356	(Brazil) Andrew Kuster	$172,398	(Brazil) Renan Alves	
October 9, 2017	Caesars Southern Indiana	424	$635,978	(United States) Justin Boggs	$139,920	(United States) Wendy Freedman	
October 16, 2017	WSOP International Circuit; King's Casino (Czech Rep.)	672	$1,134,933	(Germany) Hossein Ensan	$219,036	(Germany) Jan Timo Jobmann	
October 23, 2017	Horseshoe Hammond	1,247	$1,870,500	(United States) Blake Battaglia	$332,020	(United States) Jeff Banghart	
November 6, 2017	Harveys Lake Tahoe	458	$687,000	(United States) Maxwell Young	$147,699	(United States) James Carroll	
November 13, 2017	Choctaw Casinos Durant	908	$1,362,000	(United States) Daniel Lowery	$258,784	(Mexico) Walter Rodriguez	
November 20, 2017	Planet Hollywood Las Vegas	845	$1,267,500	(Mexico) Fernando Galvan	$247,160	(United States) Corey Hochman	
December 4, 2017	WSOP International Circuit; Club Montmartre (France)	811	$1,297,492	(France) Marius Conan	$237,017	(France) Pierre Merlin	
December 3, 2017	Harrah's Cherokee	957	$1,435,500	(United States) Charles Johnson Jr	$272,744	(United States) James Moon	
December 18, 2017	WSOP International Circuit; The Star, Sydney (Australia)	1,067	A$2,134,000	(Australia) Michael Kanaan	A$394,837	(Australia) Michael Fraser	
December 12, 2017	The Bicycle Casino	687	$1,024,500	(United States) Jared Jaffee	$211,220	(United States) Brendan Baksh	
December 17, 2017	WSOP International Circuit; Enjoy Punta del Este (Uruguay)	533	$717,880	(Brazil) Andre Sa	$144,975	(Argentina) Mario Niciforo	
January 15, 2018	Choctaw Casinos Durant	1,249	$1,873,500	(United States) Jason Strasser	$332,539	(United States) Krzysztof Stybaniewicz	
January 22, 2018	Thunder Valley Casino	599	$898,500	(United States) Hafiz Khan	$188,686	(United States) Roland Shen	
January 28, 2018	WSOP International Circuit; Casino Marrakesh (Morocco)	486	$712,276	(Russia) Vladimir Shabalin	$145,997	(France) Rony Halimi	
January 29, 2018	Horseshoe Casino Tunica	597	$895,500	(United States) Sam Washburn	$188,068	(United States) Scott Stewart	
February 12, 2018	Potawatomi Casino	604	$906,000	(United States) Keven Stammen	$190,265	(United States) Michael Crawford	
February 19, 2018	Seminole Casino Coconut Creek	827	$1,240,500	(United States) Kammar Andries	$241,898	(United States) Michael Linster	
February 27, 2018	Rio Casino Las Vegas	887	$1,330,500	(United States) Kevin Iacofano	$259,463	(United States) Nikhil Gera	
March 5, 2018	WSOP International Circuit; Casinò di Campione (Italy)	207	$171,532	(United States) Michael Lech	$39,053	(Italy) Massimiliano Forti	
March 14, 2018	The Bicycle Casino	705	$1,057,500	(United States) David Pham	$216,790	(United States) Thomas Braband	
March 19, 2018	Harrah's Atlantic City	306	$459,000	(United States) Soheb Porbandarwala	$107,862	(United States) Peter Vitantonio	
March 19, 2018	WSOP International Circuit; King's Casino (Czech Rep.)	796	$1,400,267	(Bosnia and Herzegovina) Amar Begovic	$271,584	(Israel) Timur Margolin	
March 23, 2018	WSOP International Circuit; Le Croisette Cannes (France)	356	$566,850	(France) Sonny Franco	$127,069	(Morocco) Anas Belatik	
March 26, 2018	Hard Rock Hotel & Casino Tulsa	721	$1,081,500	(United States) Jonathan Poche	$216,307	(United States) Chad Smith	
April 2, 2018	Planet Hollywood Las Vegas	610	$915,000	(United States) Benjamin Zamani	$192,152	(United States) Ben Palmer	
April 8, 2018	Horseshoe Council Bluffs	266	$399,000	(United States) David Davenport	$97,754	(United States) Jeffrey Tebben	
April 20, 2018	Harrah's Cherokee	1,060	$1,590,000	(United States) Dylan Wilkerson	$294,152	(United States) Erick Lindgren	
May 7, 2018	Horseshoe Baltimore	513	$769,500	(United States) Michael Jukich	$165,438	(United States) Jeremy Stein	
May 21, 2018	Harrah's New Orleans	677	$1,015,500	(United States) Jerry Monroe	$208,184	(United States) Darren Martin	
May 27, 2018	WSOP International Circuit; Sochi Casino (Russia)	1,699	$1,875,067	(Ukraine) Vadim Shlez	$289,958	(Russia) Andrey Chernokoz	

=== 2018–19 season ===
Date	Location	Entries	Prize Pool	Winner	Prize	Runner-up	Results
August 13, 2018	Harrah's Cherokee	1,056	$1,599,840	(United States) Adam Ross	$295,970	(United States) Ryan Phan	
August 27, 2018	Foxwoods Resort Casino	519	$786,285	(United States) Gordon Wilcox	$169,052	(United States) Jason Bolton	
September 3, 2018	WSOP International Circuit; Playground Poker (Canada)	2,401	$1,791,254	(Canada) Danny Freitas	$226,836	(Canada) Maxime Boulais	
September 8, 2018	WSOP International Circuit; Holland Rotterdam (Netherlands)	181	$301,799	(Netherlands) Tobias Peters	$78,467	(Netherlands) Bart Beenen	
September 17, 2018	Thunder Valley Casino	464	$702,960	(United States) Brett Murray	$151,145	(United States) Viet Tran	
September 24, 2018	Seminole Casino Coconut Creek	735	$1,113,525	(United States) Dmitrii Perfilev	$222,691	(United States) Mohammad Siddiqui	
October 2, 2018	WSOP International Circuit; Copacabana Palace (Brazil)	1,637	$1,344,165	(Brazil) Jordan Piva	$246,425	(Brazil) Victor Begara	
October 8, 2018	WSOP International Circuit; King's Casino (Czech Rep.)	675	$1,105,947	(Switzerland) Emil Bise	$213,459	(Austria) Eyal Bensimhon	
October 8, 2018	Caesars Southern Indiana	389	$589,335	(United States) Heather Alcorn	$129,654	(United States) Kevin Iacofano	
October 22, 2018	Horseshoe Hammond	1,094	$1,657,410	(United States) Zachery Schneider	$302,492	(United States) Nick Pupillo	
November 5, 2018	Harveys Lake Tahoe	442	$669,630	(United States) Scott Sanders	$147,314	(United States) Nick Pupillo	
November 12, 2018	Choctaw Casinos Durant	893	$1,352,895	(United States) Maxwell Young	$263,815	(United States) Jared Hemingway	
November 27, 2018	Planet Hollywood Las Vegas	518	$784,770	(United States) Travis Dorsey	$168,722	(United States) Ryan Tosoc	
December 3, 2018	Harrah's Cherokee	1,127	$1,707,405	(United States) Jacob Bazeley	$311,616	(United States) Kyle Cartwright	
December 12, 2018	WSOP International Circuit; Enjoy Punta del Este (Uruguay)	583	$565,510	(Argentina) Gabriel Muzzio	$107,545	(Chile) Pedro Riquelme	
December 17, 2018	WSOP International Circuit; The Star, Sydney (Australia)	1,191	$1,709,770	(Australia) Alexander Lynskey	$303,477	(Australia) Matthew Pongrass	
December 12, 2018	The Bicycle Casino	547	$828,705	(United States) Steven Spunt	$174,055	(United States) David Lambard	
December 17, 2018	IP Casino Biloxi	382	$578,730	(United States) Kevin Johnson	$127,319	(United States) Luke Graham	
January 14, 2019	Choctaw Casinos Durant	1,161	$1,758,915	(United States) Dave Alfa	$320,998	(United States) Adedapo Ajayi	
January 20, 2019	WSOP International Circuit; Casino Marrakesh (Morocco)	544	$746,964	(France) Sonny Franco	$157,831	(France) Jimmy Kebe	
January 21, 2019	Thunder Valley Casino	608	$921,920	(United States) Thomas Kornechuk	$193,439	(United States) Brett Murray	
January 28, 2019	Horseshoe Casino Tunica	639	$968,085	(United States) Kyle Cartwright	$198,451	(United States) Steve Klein	
February 11, 2019	Potawatomi Casino	667	$1,010,505	(United States) Mike Hudson	$207,159	(United States) Joshua Turner	
February 18, 2019	Seminole Casino Coconut Creek	805	$1,219,575	(United States) Zachary Donovan	$243,916	(United States) Sokchheka Pho	
February 26, 2019	Rio Casino Las Vegas	952	$1,442,280	(United States) Viet Van Vo	$274,030	(United States) Sohale Khalili	
March 4, 2019	Horseshoe Hammond	1,050	$1,590,750	(United States) Elik Vodovoz	$294,290	(United States) Derek Hanauer	
March 13, 2019	The Bicycle Casino	678	$1,027,170	(South Korea) Sean Yu	$210,585	(United States) Andrew Moreno	
March 18, 2019	Harrah's Atlantic City	357	$540,855	(United States) Ryan Eriquezzo	$124,397	(United States) Denis Gnidash	
March 25, 2019	Hard Rock Hotel & Casino Tulsa	533	$1,000,000	(United States) Phillip Pope	$215,000	(United States) Kou Vang	
March 31, 2019	WSOP International Circuit; Casino Royale (St. Maarten)	165	$250,000	(France) Adam Cedric	$67,000	(United States) Michael Lech	
April 1, 2019	Horseshoe Las Vegas	607	$919,605	(United States) Asher Conniff	$193,147	(United States) Joshua Suyat	
April 1, 2019	WSOP International Circuit; King's Casino (Czech Rep.)	650	$1,178,304	(Czech Republic) Martin Kabrhel	$225,190	(England) Harry Ross	
April 8, 2019	Horseshoe Council Bluffs	273	$413,595	(United States) Nicholas Burris	$99,267	(United States) Blair Hinkle	
April 13, 2019	WSOP International Circuit; Dusk Till Dawn (England)	1,023	$1,304,053	(Russia) Andrey Veselov	$149,353	(England) Hasmukh Khodiyara	
April 21, 2019	WSOP International Circuit; Le Croisette Cannes (France)	343	$609,917	(Serbia) Marko Cosic	$114,645	(Georgia (country)) Shota Sakandelia	
April 20, 2019	Harrah's Cherokee	1,087	$1,646,085	(United States) Jonas Wexler	$300,536	(United States) Phillip Hernz	
May 3, 2019	Horseshoe Casino Tunica	466	$705,990	(United States) Blake Whittington	$151,789	(United States) Asaf Ben Shushan	
May 20, 2019	Harrah's New Orleans	582	$881,730	(United States) Chris Lane	$185,158	(United States) Dustin Stewart	

=== 2019–20 season ===
Date	Location	Entries	Prize Pool	Winner	Prize	Runner-up	Results
June 23, 2019	WSOP International Circuit; Casino Marrakesh (Morocco)	359	$477,974	(England) Phillip Huxley	$96,693	(Portugal) André Marques	
July 28, 2019	WSOP International Circuit; Sochi Casino (Russia)	1,310	$1,175,398	(Russia) Alexey Melnikov	$121,725	(Russia) Lev Nechaev	
July 29, 2019	Choctaw Casinos Durant	976	$1,478,640	(United States) Hollis Holcomb	$255,535	(United States) Vincent Moscati	
August 12, 2019	Harrah's Cherokee	1,057	$1,601,355	(United States) Billy Cashwell	$271,234	(United States) Forrest Raleigh	
August 25, 2019	Foxwoods Resort Casino	468	$709,020	(United States) Justin Carey	$143,293	(United States) Maurice Hawkins	
September 2, 2019	WSOP International Circuit; Playground Poker (Canada)	2,142	$1,556,412	(Canada) Joe Pellegrino	$225,813	(Canada) Qi Hu	
August 25, 2019	Ameristar Casino St.Charles	414	$627,210	(United States) Scott Hall	$130,667	(United States) Andreas Ioakimides	
September 16, 2019	Thunder Valley Casino	414	$627,210	(United States) Paul Richardson	$130,667	(United States) Arish Nat	
September 17, 2019	WSOP International Circuit; Copacabana Palace (Brazil)	1,013	$918,791	(Brazil) Kadu Campion	$170,108	(Brazil) Luiz Rolim	
September 22, 2019	Potawatomi Casino	447	$667,205	(United States) Richard Bai	$138,317	(United States) Matthew Levine	
September 27, 2019	Seminole Casino Coconut Creek	617	$1,000,000	(United States) Steven Sarmiento	$188,158	(United States) Neal Corcoran	
October 7, 2019	Caesars Southern Indiana	357	$540,855	(United States) Thomas Alcorn	$117,322	(United States) Robert James	
October 14, 2019	WSOP International Circuit; King's Casino (Czech Rep.)	768	$1,244,873	(Czech Republic) Oliva Jakub	$237,057	(Belgium) Otto Honan	
October 14, 2019	Horseshoe Baltimore	303	$500,000	(United States) Faisal Siddiqui	$113,143	(United States) Joseph Malebranche	
October 21, 2019	WSOP International Circuit; Cintermex Monterrey (Mexico)	1,016	$949,735	(Mexico) Roberto Borrego	$175,701	(Uruguay) Fabrizio Cataldi	
October 20, 2019	Horseshoe Hammond	1,063	$1,610,445	(United States) Ravi Raghavan	$272,322	(United States) Michael Wolff	
November 3, 2019	Harveys Lake Tahoe	424	$642,360	(United States) Michael Pearson	$133,285	(United States) Jeremy Kottler	
November 10, 2019	Choctaw Casinos Durant	983	$1,489,245	(United States) Nathanael Kogel	$256,915	(United States) Jesus Martinez	
November 21, 2019	WSOP International Circuit; Holland Rotterdam (Netherlands)	495	$525,327	(Russia) Andrei Beiinov	$92,142	(Netherlands) Erik de Jong	
November 23, 2019	WSOP International Circuit; Hilton Aruba Casino (Aruba)	269	$407,535	(United States) Richard Troendly	$95,061	(United States) Matthew Russell	
November 26, 2019	Planet Hollywood Las Vegas	778	$1,178,670	(United States) Michael Trivett	$215,943	(United States) James Petzing	
December 9, 2019	WSOP International Circuit; The Star, Sydney (Australia)	1,124	$1,521,401	(Australia) Steven Zhou	$277,658	(Australia) Lior Segre	
December 9, 2019	Harrah's Cherokee	1,000	$1,515,000	(United States) Erik Gorman	$260,480	(United States) Hannah Guthrie	
December 11, 2019	WSOP International Circuit; Enjoy Punta del Este (Uruguay)	600	$582,000	(Brazil) Joao Bauer	$110,000	(Brazil) Nicolas Reis	
December 11, 2019	The Bicycle Casino	487	$737,805	(United States) Said El Harrak	$147,435	(United States) Ronnie Tate	
December 16, 2019	IP Casino Biloxi	281	$425,715	(United States) Boris Kasabov	$98,044	(United States) Benjamin Thomas	
December 22, 2019	Harrah's Las Vegas	665	$1,007,475	(United States) Anthony Spinella	$192,199	(India) Nipun Java	
January 13, 2020	Choctaw Casinos Durant	1,065	$1,613,475	(United States) Dustin Schoonover	$272,846	(Canada) John Skrovan	
January 18, 2020	WSOP International Circuit; Casino Marrakesh (Morocco)	625	$861,573	(Italy) Samiyel Duzgun	$169,018	(Israel) Ayman Jarrar	
January 20, 2020	Thunder Valley Casino	487	$737,805	(United States) Jaime Haletky	$147,706	(United States) Adedapo Ajayi	
January 27, 2020	Horseshoe Casino Tunica	491	$743,865	(United States) Lytle Allen	$144,313	(United States) Bryan Piccioli	
February 10, 2020	Potawatomi Casino	524	$793,860	(United States) Philip Shing	$151,284	(United States) Kenneth Donarski	
February 17, 2020	Seminole Hard Rock Tampa	1,160	$1,760,430	(United States) Isaac Kempton	$290,974	(United States) David Jackson	
February 25, 2020	Rio Casino Las Vegas	747	$1,131,705	(United States) Bradley Hinson	$209,216	(United States) Trung Pham	
March 2, 2020	Horseshoe Hammond	989	$1,498,335	(United States) Shiva Dudani	$258,078	(United States) Casey Carroll	
March 9, 2020	Ameristar Casino St.Charles	281	$425,715	(United States) Zachary Ryan	$92,886	(United States) Mark Koeln	
March 16, 2020	Harrah's Atlantic City	Cancelled due COVID-19 pandemic					
March 18, 2020	The Bicycle Casino	Cancelled due COVID-19 pandemic					
March 23, 2020	WSOP International Circuit; King's Casino (Czech Rep.)	Cancelled due COVID-19 pandemic					
March 23, 2020	Hard Rock Hotel & Casino Tulsa	Cancelled due COVID-19 pandemic					
March 29, 2020	WSOP.com ONLINE; Super Circuit Series (US ONLY)	1,134	$567,000	(United States) Champie Douglas "kiddchamp"	$130,410	(United States) Scott Blumstein "2Due4U"	
March 30, 2020	Horseshoe Las Vegas	Cancelled due COVID-19 pandemic					
April 6, 2020	Horseshoe Council Bluffs	Cancelled due COVID-19 pandemic					
April 6, 2020	WSOP International Circuit; Casino Royale (St. Maarten)	Cancelled due COVID-19 pandemic					
April 19, 2020	WSOP International Circuit; Le Croisette Cannes (France)	Cancelled due COVID-19 pandemic					
April 20, 2020	Harrah's Cherokee	Cancelled due COVID-19 pandemic					
May 4, 2020	Horseshoe Casino Tunica	Cancelled due COVID-19 pandemic					
May 17, 2020	WSOP International Circuit; Deerfoot Calgary (Canada)	Cancelled due COVID-19 pandemic					
May 18, 2020	Harrah's New Orleans	Cancelled due COVID-19 pandemic					
May 31, 2020	GGPoker ONLINE; Super Circuit Series	1,494	$9,290,050	(Germany) Lars Kamphues "schimmelgodx"	$1,271,218	(Canada) "Biereux"	
June 14, 2020	WSOP.com ONLINE; SEASON FINALE (US ONLY)	695	$208,500	(United States) John Riordan "macallan25"	$51,082	(United States) Robert Mather "bobeads"	

=== 2020–21 season ===
LIVE season was not held due to the ongoing situation surrounding the COVID-19 pandemic.

Date	Location	Entries	Prize Pool	Winner	Prize	Runner-up	Results
October 25, 2020	WSOP.com ONLINE; Fall Circuit	942	$471,000	(United States) Ryan Leng "Adopt_aDogg0"	$113,040	(United States) Daniel Marder "TheDinosaur"	
December 13, 2020	WSOP.com ONLINE; Super Circuit Series	931	$465,500	(United States) Tyler Cornell "muchultra"	$70,243	tbc	
January 31, 2021	WSOP.com ONLINE; Winter Online Super Circuit	893	$397,398	(United States) AJ Basselini-Truisi “jnja1719”	$67,377	(United States) Ian Kurzer “bootleg23isk”	
February 28, 2021	WSOP.com ONLINE; Planet Hollywood Circuit	723	$361,500	(United States) Derek Sudell “rickyguan”	$57,623	(United States) AJ Basselini-Truisi “jnja1719”	
March 30, 2021	WSOP.com ONLINE; Silver Legacy Circuit	739	$369,500	(United States) Gene Nicolas “gene_plays”	$58,898	(United States) William Corvino “swaggyb”	
April 25, 2021	WSOP.com ONLINE; Spring Online Super Circuit	592	$300,000	(United States) Ryan Dodd “WHOSYOURDODD”	$51,300	(United States) Fadi Elsmaily “fadiphatu1”	
May 23, 2021	WSOP.com ONLINE; Caesars Atlantic City Super Circuit	662	$331,000	(United States) Jonathan Dokler “Art.Vandelay”	$52,761	(United States) Matt Zoorob “Impervious”	
June 27, 2021	WSOP.com ONLINE; Summer Online Super Circuit	679	$339,485	(United States) David Nodes “dave419”	$54,116	(United States) Romain Lotti “terrrr1”	
July 27, 2021	WSOP.com ONLINE; Bally's Online Circuit	633	$321,507	(United States) Bryan Piccioli “Pellepelle”	$51,247	(United States) Josh King “YoelRomero”	
August 29, 2021	WSOP.com ONLINE; Rio Online Circuit	679	$339,500	(United States) Jared Shipley “Jrock6000”	$54,116	(United States) Joe Enger “Jenger420”	
September 5, 2021	GGPoker ONLINE; WSOP Online 2021	4,092	$20,000,000	(Russia) Aleksei Vandyshev “Ha KoJleHu”	$2,543,073	(Brazil) Edson Tsutsumi Jr “CrownUpTsu”	
September 14, 2021	WSOP International Circuit; King's Casino (Czech Rep.)	912	$1,587,977	(Italy) Andrea Ricci	$291,882	(Italy) Simone Lombardo	
October 26, 2021	WSOP.com ONLINE; Fall Online Super Circuit	635	$317,517	(United States) Mark Herm “nj_acesmarka”	$50,610	(United States) Jordyn Miller “ThLstCrdBndr”	
November 11, 2021	WSOP.com ONLINE; Paris Las Vegas Online Circuit	714	$357,018	(United States) Chris O'Brien “snapshot66”	$56,906	(United States) Drew O'Connell “dudeguydrew”	
December 19, 2021	WSOP.com ONLINE; Harrah's Las Vegas Online Circuit	641	$320,516	(United States) Robert Peacock	$51,088	(United States) Andrew McElroy	
December 28, 2021	WSOP.com ONLINE $250,000 Year End Championship Event			tbc			

=== 2021–22 season ===
Date	Location	Entries	Prize Pool	Winner	Prize	Runner-up	Results
December 5, 2021	Harrah's Cherokee	1,375	$2,083,125	(United States) Donald Crabtree	$329,828	(United States) Scott Davis	
December 13, 2021	The Bicycle Casino	525	$795,375	(France) Yoann Gimenez	$156,160	(United States) Tongguang Sun	
December 19, 2021	WSOP International Circuit; Hilton Aruba Casino (Aruba)	183	$277,293	(United States) Michael Cohen	$69,663	(Panama) Adrian Santos	
January 17, 2022	Choctaw Casinos Durant	1,411	$2,137,665	(United States) Quan Tran	$336,412	(United States) Raul Garza	
January 24, 2022	WSOP International Circuit; Deerfoot Calgary (Canada)	1,179	$1,429,463	(Canada) Cody Mckay	$235,596	(United States) Jason Su	
January 24, 2022	Thunder Valley Casino	587	$889,305	(United States) Victor Paredes	$169,294	(United States) Garrett Anaya	
January 25, 2022	WSOP International Circuit; King's Casino (Czech Rep.)	808	$1,349,217	(Turkey) Feyzullah Karaarslan	$243,134	(Serbia) Aleksandar Tomovic	
January 30, 2022	Horseshoe Casino Tunica	674	$1,021,110	(United States) Randall Paguio	$193,764	(United States) Kenneth Mason	
February 14, 2022	Harrah's Pompano Beach	725	$1,098,375	(United States) Brian Altman	$204,935	(United States) Athanasios Polychronopoulos	
February 28, 2022	Harrah's Cherokee	1,402	$2,124,030	(United States) Mark Davis	$334,678	(United States) Adam Ney	
March 16, 2022	The Bicycle Casino	550	$833,250	(United States) Michael Jozoff	$161,500	(United States) Eugene Tito	
March 28, 2022	Turning Stone Casino	891	$1,349,865	(United States) Joseph Rice	$238,870	(Canada) Giuseppe Galuzzo	
March 28, 2022	Horseshoe Las Vegas	468	$709,020	(Italy) Andrea Buonocore	$143,229	(United States) Eric Baldwin	
April 4, 2022	WSOP International Circuit; Casino Royale (St. Maarten)	256	$387,840	(Hungary) Peter Turmezey	$95,000	(United States) John Henderson	
April 17, 2022	GGPoker ONLINE; WSOP Spring Circuit	13,397	$6,698,500	(Israel) "pisgapoker_1"	$634,855	(Austria) "pedrinhoOo"	
April 18, 2022	Harrah's Cherokee	1,213	$1,837,695	(United States) Jared Ingles	$300,736	(United States) Changlong Zeng	
April 19, 2022	WSOP International Circuit; King's Casino (Czech Rep.)	648	$1,036,713	(Germany) Volkan Alkan	$185,627	(Italy) Besnik Lalinovci	
April 24, 2022	WSOP International Circuit; Le Croisette Cannes (France)	515	$724,903	(France) Cyrille Mazet	$134,132	(France) Ibrahim Senoussi	
May 2, 2022	Horseshoe Casino Tunica	536	$812,040	(United States) Gavin Munroe	$158,424	(United States) Lance Goodman	
May 22, 2022	WSOP International Circuit; Casino Plaza Dakar (Senegal)	259	$344,399	(Mauritania) Mohamed Wely	$80,104	(France) Junior Necco	
May 28, 2022	WSOP International Circuit; Holland Rotterdam (Netherlands)	961	$985,721	(Germany) Han Kuo	$137,019	(Netherlands) Gert Albers	
May 30, 2022	WSOP International Circuit; Deerfoot Calgary (Canada)	905	$1,070,860	(Canada) Robert Limpert	$188,793	(Canada) Cuong Lieu	

=== 2022–23 season ===
Date	Location	Entries	Prize Pool	Winner	Prize	Runner-up	Results
August 1, 2022	Choctaw Casinos Durant	931	$1,410,465	(United States) Daniel Marx	$255,535	(United States) Quan Tran	
August 15, 2022	Harrah's Cherokee	1,558	$2,360,370	(United States) Brett Bader	$364,104	(United States) Matthew Wantman	
August 29, 2022	Hard Rock Hotel & Casino Tulsa	646	$978,690	(United States) Arthur Morris	$182,379	(United States) Mike Cordell	
September 26, 2022	Horseshoe Council Bluffs	368	$557,520	(United States) Joshua Reichard	$120,445	(United States) John Fagg	
September 26, 2022	GGPoker ONLINE; WSOP Online 2022	4,984	$23,674,000	(Sweden) Simon Mattsson “C.Darwin2”	$2,793,575	(Thailand) Kannapong Thanarattrakul “Kanna Pong”	
October 10, 2022	Thunder Valley Casino	726	$1,099,890	(United States) Rob Grossglauser	$205,203	(United States) Randall Chamberlain	
October 11, 2022	WSOP International Circuit; King's Casino (Czech Rep.)	748	$1,085,998	(Switzerland) Denis Gergoc	$197,198	(Germany) Lars Kamphues	
October 24, 2022	Harrah's Pompano Beach	726	$1,099,890	(United States) Michael Chiappetta	$200,196	(United States) James Calderaro	
October 26, 2022	WSOP International Circuit; Hotel Unique São Paulo (Brazil)	835	$509,025	(Brazil) Christian Poras	$96,174	(Brazil) Pedro Madeira	
October 31, 2022	Harveys Lake Tahoe	513	$777,195	(United States) Jarod Minghini	$153,368	(United States) Jonathon Smith	
November 14, 2022	Choctaw Casinos Durant	1,076	$1,630,140	(United States) Sami Bechahed	$274,916	(United States) Arthur Morris	
November 14, 2022	Grand Victoria Casino Elgin	1,070	$1,621,050	(United States) Frank Lagodich	$275,896	(United States) Jill Bryant	
December 3, 2022	WSOP International Circuit; Holland Rotterdam (Netherlands)	719	$714,830	(Netherlands) Joey Cheung	$107,652	(Turkey) Osman Ihlamur	
December 5, 2022	Harrah's Cherokee	1,502	$2,275,530	(United States) Donovan Dean	$356,952	(United States) Tyler Phillips	
December 6, 2022	WSOP International Circuit; The Star, Sydney (Australia)	1,001	$1,533,750	(Australia) Po Hu	$263,230	(Australia) Adam Cusenza	
December 7, 2022	WSOP International Circuit; Enjoy Punta del Este (Uruguay)	558	$541.260	(Argentina) Juan Repetto	$103,765	(Argentina) Eduardo Santi	
December 14, 2022	The Bicycle Casino	252	$381,780	(United States) Andrew Merrick	$87,120	(United States) Xingyao Wang	
January 9, 2023	GGPoker ONLINE; WSOP Winter Circuit	7,039	$11,367,985	(Mexico) "VeryMerry"	$1,184,690	(Mexico) Pavel Plesuv "EzzzGame"	
January 15, 2023	Choctaw Casinos Durant	1,491	$2,258,865	(United States) Chase Davis	$357,269	(United States) Jonathan Dull	
January 22, 2023	WSOP International Circuit; Casino Marrakesh (Morocco)	554	$1,352,339	(Portugal) Sílvio Costa	$199,093	(France) Antony Lellouche	
January 23, 2023	WSOP International Circuit; Deerfoot Calgary (Canada)	1,432	$1,617,483	(Canada) Johnathan French	$253,692	(Canada) Mehdi Saeed	
January 23, 2023	Thunder Valley Casino	679	$1,028,685	(Mongolia) Bilguun Odgerel	$195,194	(United States) Brandon Zuidema	
January 24, 2023	WSOP International Circuit; King's Casino (Czech Rep.)	689	$1,097,015	(Netherlands) Ercan Atcama	$196,955	(Czech Republic) Patrik Jaros	
January 30, 2023	Horseshoe Casino Tunica	642	$972,630	(United States) Preston McEwen	$183,653	(United States) Carl Masters	
February 11, 2023	WSOP International Circuit; Casino Plaza Dakar (Senegal)	476	$269,168	(France) Cecile Ticherfatine	$65,372	(France) Mounim Kaddouri	
February 13, 2023	Harrah's Pompano Beach	1,015	$1,537,725	(United States) Christopher Trombley	$266,186	(United States) Bobby Lupo	
February 21, 2023	Horseshoe Las Vegas	833	$1,261,995	(United States) Bin Weng	$227,344	(United States) William Alex Foxen	
February 27, 2023	Harrah's Cherokee	1,703	$2,580,045	(United States) Brian Altman	$391,753	(United States) Ronald Sewell	
March 6, 2023	Horseshoe Hammond	1,093	$1,655,895	(United States) David Schonback	$282,725	(United States) Nicholas Blumenthal	
March 11, 2023	The Bicycle Casino	338	$512,070	(United States) Tae Kim	$111,075	(Spain) Santiago Cortijo	
March 20, 2023	Hard Rock Hotel & Casino Tulsa	476	$721,140	(United States) John Lopez	$145,876	(United States) Richard Gebhart	
March 20, 2023	WSOP International Circuit; Dusk Till Dawn (England)	439	$586,195	(England) Matthew Gray	$120,864	(England) Hong Pham	
March 27, 2023	Turning Stone Casino	1,070	$1,621,050	(United States) Shaun Deeb	$275,916	(United States) Giyeon Han	
April 3, 2023	WSOP International Circuit; Sonesta Maho Casino (St. Maarten)	219	$331,785	(United States) Ian Gavlick	$88,000	(United States) Elias Asi	
April 17, 2023	Grand Victoria Casino Elgin	954	$1,445,310	(United States) Joshua Reichard	$253,073	(United States) Jordan Lowery	
April 23, 2023	WSOP International Circuit; Le Croisette Cannes (France)	650	$923,786	(France) Eric Koskas	$151,332	(England) Ben Jones	
May 1, 2023	Horseshoe Casino Tunica	418	$633,270	(United States) Trace Henderson	$132,846	(United States) Steve McCluskey	
May 13, 2023	WSOP International Circuit; Holland Venlo (Netherlands)	949	$999,821	(Netherlands) Wouter Beltz	$138,975	(Netherlands) Antoine Vranken	
May 15, 2023	WSOP International Circuit; Deerfoot Calgary (Canada)	946	$1,071,738	(Canada) Krystin Hady	$180,641	(Canada) Matt Kwong	
May 15, 2023	Harrah's Cherokee	1,205	$1,825,575	(United States) Ryan Jones	$302,131	(United States) Jonathan Lewis	
May 22, 2023	Caesars Southern Indiana	406	$615,090	(United States) Michael Scarborough	$123,687	(United States) Luke Graham	

=== 2023–24 season ===
Date	Location	Entries	Prize Pool	Winner	Prize	Runner-up	Results
July 30, 2023	WSOPC Dallas/Oklahoma; Choctaw Casinos Durant	1,026	$1,552,338	(United States) Harvey Castro	$275,660	(United States) Christopher Staats	
August 13, 2023	WSOPC Super Circuit London; JW Marriott (England)	910	$3,707,913	(Germany) Tobias Schwecht	$611,614	(Thailand) Kannapong Thanarattrakul	
August 14, 2023	WSOPC North Carolina; Harrah's Cherokee	1,623	$2,458,845	(United States) William Kopp	$376,154	(United States) Brian Jones	
August 21, 2023	WSOPC Northern California; Graton Resort & Casino	616	$933,240	(United States) Michael Persky	$175,595	(United States) Dan Sarasin	
August 28, 2023	WSOPC Tulsa; Hard Rock Hotel & Casino	397	$601,455	(United States) Mark Barrientos	$126,900	(United States) Lionel Jiang	
September 18, 2023	WSOPC Omaha/Iowa; Horseshoe Council Bluffs	352	$533,280	(United States) David Hengen	$116,846	(United States) Mohammed Nuwwarah	
September 24, 2023	WSOPC Tallinn; Olympic Park Tallinn (Estonia)	719	$1,068,719	(Spain) Ignacio Garrido	$107,245	(Sweden) Emil Hovmark	
October 9, 2023	WSOPC Northern California; Thunder Valley Casino	594	$899,910	(United States) Michael Persky	$170,780	(United States) Tracy Oto	
October 10, 2023	WSOPC Rozvadov I King's Casino (Czech Rep.)	543	$1,000,147	(Romania) Cristian Cirja	$179,342	(Bosnia and Herzegovina) Nisad Muratovic	
October 16, 2023	WSOPC Chicago; Horseshoe Hammond	668	$1,042,320	(United States) Brant Jolly	$196,842	(United States) Benjamin Grise	
October 23, 2023	WSOPC Pompano Beach; Harrah's Pompano Beach	825	$1,234,725	(United States) Morgan Petro	$218,549	(United States) John Mcdonald	
November 6, 2023	WSOPC Dallas/Oklahoma; Choctaw Casinos Durant	934	$1,415,010	(United States) Brad Ruben	$250,140	(United States) David Diaz	
November 13, 2023	WSOPC Nevada; Harveys Lake Tahoe	362	$548,430	(United States) Bradley Ritschel	$115,740	(United States) James Chavanarojrit	
November 20, 2023	WSOPC Chicago; Grand Victoria Casino Elgin	652	$987,780	(United States) Stephen Song	$183,508	(United States) Lee Rzentkowski	
December 5, 2023	WSOPC Australia; The Star, Sydney (Australia)	508	$909,181	(Australia) Craig Rimmer	$179,758	(Australia) JP Rounce-Sue	
December 3, 2023	WSOPC Sanremo; Sanremo Casino (Italy)	906	$842,050	(Cyprus) Georgios Tsouloftas	$131,831	(Italy) Flaviano Cammisuli	
December 4, 2023	WSOPC North Carolina; Harrah's Cherokee	1,470	$2,227,050	(United States) Joseph Crowley	$351,382	(United States) Daniel Weinman	
January 15, 2024	WSOPC Dallas/Oklahoma; Choctaw Casinos Durant	851	$1,289,265	(United States) Jonathan Glendinning	$231,832	(United States) William Berry	
January 16, 2024	WSOPC Rozvadov; King's Casino (Czech Rep.)	1,247	$1,299,699	(Israel) Asher Dahan "Dadi17"	$230,778	(Czech Republic) Caner Toker	
January 21, 2024	WSOPC Marrakesh; Casino Marrakesh (Morocco)	1,163	$1,513,847	(England) Max Deveson	$218,543	(France) Antoine Delorme	
January 22, 2024	WSOPC Calgary; Deerfoot Calgary (Canada)	1,475	$1,653,857	(Canada) Zhun Chen	$247,854	(Canada) Hasanain Ghunaim	
January 22, 2024	WSOPC Northern California; Thunder Valley Casino	742	$1,124,130	(United States) Denis Lee	$207,020	(United States) Kaylen Lebaron	
January 29, 2024	WSOPC Mississippi; Horseshoe Casino Tunica	568	$791,673	(United States) Matthew Higgins	$167,058	(United States) Dale Roesel	
February 12, 2024	WSOPC Pompano Beach; Harrah's Pompano Beach	917	$1,389,255	(United States) Hamid Izadi	$245,225	(United States) Boris Kasabov	
February 26, 2024	WSOPC North Carolina; Harrah's Cherokee	1,659	$2,513,385	(United States) Tyler Barnes	$383,856	(United States) Zak Gilbert	
March 11, 2024	WSOPC Chicago; Horseshoe Hammond	986	$1,493,790	(United States) Soheb Porbandarwala	$$257,725	(United States) Bradley Coultas	
March 18, 2024	WSOPC Tulsa; Hard Rock Hotel & Casino	472	$715,080	(United States) Han Feng	$144,413	(United States) Jared Ward	
March 25, 2024	WSOPC UK; Dusk Till Dawn (England)	462	$610,936	(England) Daniel Charlton	$93,288	(Iran) Arian Hassankashani	
March 25, 2024	WSOPC New York; Turning Stone Casino	1,188	$1,799,820	(United States) Ethan Bennett	$298,546	(United States) Kathrine Brandt	
April 1, 2024	WSOPC Toronto; Great Canadian Toronto (Canada)	1,600	$2,060,657	(Canada) Khaled Aljoma	$314,390	(Canada) Jonathan Camara	
April 2, 2024	WSOPC Las Vegas; Horseshoe Las Vegas	669	$1,013,535	(Germany) Giuseppe Pantaleo	$192,831	(United States) Peter Hengsakul	
April 15, 2024	WSOPC Chicago; Grand Victoria Casino Elgin	606	$918,090	(United States) Kevin Andriamahefa	$173,593	(United States) David Kowal	
April 22, 2024	WSOPC Cannes; Le Croisette Cannes (France)	615	$612,774	(France) Alexandre Le Vaillant	$100,373	(France) Julien Sitbon	
April 22, 2024	WSOPC Montreal; Playground Toronto (Canada)	1,660	$1,804,374	(Canada) Dustin Melanson	$246,214	(Canada) Sergei Gurin	
April 29, 2024	WSOPC Mississippi; Horseshoe Casino Tunica	395	$588,425	(United States) Klinten Griffin	$127,307	(Brazil) Lucian Camargo	
May 11, 2024	WSOPC Netherlands; Holland Venlo (Netherlands)	1,138	$1,175,962	(Netherlands) Farukh Tach	$160,011	(Netherlands) Pascal Vos	
May 13, 2024	WSOPC Calgary; Deerfoot Calgary (Canada)	911	$1,004,480	(Canada) Nicholas Teeuwen	$166,471	(Canada) John Scalise	
May 13, 2024	WSOPC North Carolina; Harrah's Cherokee	981	$1,486,215	(United States) Maurice Hawkins	$259,160	(United States) Matthew Higgins	
May 13, 2024	WSOPC North Carolina; Commerce Casino Los Angeles	1,467	$2,222,505	(Germany) Jessica Vierling	$328,273	(Venezuela) Christian Roberts	
May 20, 2024	WSOPC Southern Indiana; Caesars Southern Indiana	301	$456,015	(United States) Christopher Cochran	$101,269	(United States) Daniel Hummer	
May 28, 2024	WSOPC Paris; Stade Jean-Bouin (France)	1,056	$1,153,223	(France) Mohamed Iche	$162,510	(France) Jonathan Bonnin	

=== 2024–25 season ===
Date	Location	Entries	Prize Pool	Winner	Prize	Runner-up	Results
July 28, 2024	Tallinn (Estonia); Olympic Park Tallinn	1,130	$1,143,724	(Lithuania) Aurimas Stanevicius	$182,152	(Norway) Espen Sandvik	
July 29, 2024	(United States) Dallas/Oklahoma; Choctaw Casinos Durant	1,017	$1,540,755	(United States) Justin Lapka	$252,282	(United States) Gregg Merkow	
August 12, 2024	(United States) North Carolina; Harrah's Cherokee	1,451	$2,198,625	(United States) Donovan Dean	$326,206	(United States) Andrew Rebhan	
August 19, 2024	Calgary (Canada); Deerfoot Calgary	828	$914,894	(Canada) Yuxin Liu	$156,714	(Russia) Aleksei Ponomarev	
August 26, 2024	(United States) Northern California; Graton Resort & Casino	580	$877,185	(United States) Sasha Sabbaghian	$168,015	(United States) Mitchell Tsang	
September 2, 2024	Montreal (Canada); Playground Toronto	1,503	$1,674,577	(Canada) James Pillon	$247,654	(Canada) Lucas Constable	
September 16, 2024	(United States) Omaha/Iowa; Horseshoe Council Bluffs	259	$392,385	(United States) Scott Allacher	$82,865	(United States) Timothy Garles	
September 30, 2024	(United States) Chicago; Horseshoe Hammond	746	$1,130,190	(United States) Michael Estes	$198,576	(United States) Grant Keller	
October 7, 2024	(United States) Northern California; Thunder Valley Casino	812	$1,230,180	(United States) Mark Egbert	$214,565	(United States) Xiong Thao	
October 21, 2024	(United States) Pompano Beach; Harrah's Pompano Beach	721	$1,092,315	(United States) Ian Cohen	$193,100	(United States) Joshua Hillock	
October 29, 2024	(Czech Republic) Rozvadov (Czech Rep.); King's Casino Rozvadov	716	$1,013,882	(Switzerland) "Wilfredo"	$179,963	(Israel) Maor Zaharagi	
October 28, 2024	(United States) Southern Indiana; Caesars Southern Indiana	338	$512,070	(Venezuela) Luis Yepez	$111,979	(United States) Niles Lawless	
November 4, 2024	(United States) Nevada; Harveys Lake Tahoe	439	$665,085	(United States) Evan Sandberg	$133,837	(United States) James Czarnecki	
November 11, 2024	Sanremo (Italy); Sanremo Casino Sanremo	1,050	$954,935	(Italy) Mario Perati	$132,377	(France) Herve Gouzil	
November 11, 2024	(United States) Dallas/Oklahoma; Choctaw Casinos Durant	944	$1,430,160	(United States) Phillip Bertram	$237,307	(United States) Zak Baron	
November 18, 2024	(United States) Chicago; Grand Victoria Casino Elgin	757	$1,146,855	(United States) Jeremy Lenz	$194,977	(United States) Cero Zuccarello	
November 26, 2024	Sydney (Australia); The Star, Sydney Sydney	1,035	$1,481,322	(Australia) Michael Brahim	$252,154	(Australia) Banipal Babana	
December 2, 2024	(United States) Las Vegas; Horseshoe Las Vegas	455	$689,325	(United States) David Jackson	$139,996	(United States) Yaniv Livnat	
December 8, 2024	(United States) North Carolina; Harrah's Cherokee	1,288	$1,951,320	(United States) Jacob Hamed	$299,010	(United States) Vaughn Steeves	
January 14, 2025	(Czech Republic) Rozvadov (Czech Rep.); King's Casino Rozvadov	1,110	$1,069,552	(Israel) Natanel Elidan	$187,920	(Romania) Adrian Cazacu	
January 19, 2025	(Monaco) Marrakesh (Morocco); Casino Marrakesh	1,523	$1,943,001	(Hong Kong) Justin Tsui	$270,118	(Spain) Aitor Cruz	
January 20, 2025	Calgary (Canada); Deerfoot Calgary	1,571	$1,448,179	(Canada) Manish Ralh	$217,968	(Canada) Angelo Jopek	
January 20, 2025	(United States) Dallas/Oklahoma; Choctaw Casinos Durant	1,070	$1,447,110	(United States) Eric Taylor	$259,721	(United States) Sung Lee	
January 27, 2025	(United States) Northern California; Thunder Valley Casino	676	$1,024,140	(United States) Akbar Zamani	$187,882	(Canada) Antonio Ma	
February 1, 2025	(United States) Mississippi; Horseshoe Casino Tunica	487	$737,805	(United States) Jessie Bryant	$144,962	(United States) Dylan Lemery	
February 10, 2025	(United States) Pompano Beach; Harrah's Pompano Beach	914	$1,384,710	(United States) Arthur Peacock	$230,794	(United States) Darryll Fish	
February 24, 2025	(United States) North Carolina; Harrah's Cherokee	1,710	$2,590,650	(France) Florian Pesce	$368,380	(United States) Jarrett Mullins	
February 24, 2025	(United States) Northern California; Graton Resort & Casino	558	$845,370	(United States) Alexandr Lipkin	$162,520	(United States) Michael Lin	
March 3, 2025	(United States) Baltimore; Horseshoe Casino Baltimore	468	$709,020	(United States) Maurice Hawkins	$140,752	(United States) Dan Chalifour	
March 10, 2025	(United States) Chicago; Horseshoe Hammond	900	$1,363,500	(United States) Evan Bethyo	$228,398	(United States) John Reading	
March 17, 2025	(United States) Tulsa; Hard Rock Hotel & Casino	487	$737,805	(United States) John Dollinger	$147,178	(United States) Russell Brooks	
March 21, 2025	Amsterdam (Netherlands); Holland Amsterdam	1,505	$1,572,383	(Spain) Jordi Ruiz	$142,121	(Netherlands) Max Broens	
March 24, 2025	(United States) New York; Turning Stone Casino	1,183	$1,792,245	(United States) Taylor Hart	$280,770	(United States) Michael Aman	
April 1, 2025	(United States) Las Vegas; Horseshoe Las Vegas	774	$1,172,610	(United States) Shannon Shorr	$207,615	(United States) Jordyn Miller	
April 14, 2025	(United States) Chicago; Grand Victoria Casino Elgin	637	$965,055	(United States) Stephen Buell	$175,684	(United States) Matthew Lubawski	
April 21, 2025	Aix-en-Provence (France); Pasino Aix-en-Provence	1,433	$1,407,265	(Slovenia) David Gradic	$181,859	(France) Thierry Amirault	
April 21, 2025	Toronto (Canada); Great Canadian Toronto	2,139	$2,692,017	(Canada) Pengxiang Ruan	$366,950	(Canada) Igor Tregoubov	
April 28, 2025	(United States) Mississippi; Horseshoe Casino Tunica	371	$562,065	(United States) Vincent Moscati	$111,454	(United States) Michael Esquivel	
May 19, 2025	(United States) Southern Indiana; Caesars Southern Indiana	250	$378,750	(United States) Ulises Roman	$84,399	(United States) Trace Henderson	
May 21, 2025	(United States) Los Angeles; Commerce Casino	1,554	$2,354,306	(United States) Artur Papazyan	$341,830	(United States) Luis Concha	
May 31, 2025	Venlo (Netherlands); Holland Venlo	1,146	$1,262,258	(Spain) Victor Pinna	$127,313	(England) Callum Moody	

=== 2025 season ===
Date	Location	Entries	Prize Pool	Winner	Prize	Runner-up	Results
July 16–27, 2025 (Ring event)	(United States) Dallas/Oklahoma; Choctaw Casinos Durant	968	$1,457,250	(United States) Alexis Cruz	$241,412	(United States) Alex Rindone	(Ring)
July 25- August 3, 2025 (Ring event)	Tallinn (Estonia); Olympic Park Tallinn	888	€1,138,860	(Sweden) Jenny Westerlund	€200,200	(Poland) Krzysztof Chmielowski	(Ring)
August 1–12, 2025	Samorin (Slovakia); Card Casino Šamorín	882	€1,039,216	(Slovakia) Robert Obrtlík	€180,200	(Italy) Erik Olivo	
August 7–18, 2025 (Ring event)	(United States) North Carolina; Harrah's Cherokee	1,437	$2,177,055	(United States) Zachary Fischer	$324,135	(United States) J.B. Wells	(Ring)
August 14–25, 2025 (Ring event)	(United States) Northern California; Graton Resort & Casino	616	$933,240	(United States) Michael Persky	$175,595	(Thailand) Dan Sarasin	(Ring)
August 14–25, 2025 (Ring event)	(United States) Atlantic City; Harrah's Atlantic City	635	$962,025	(Ukraine) Bohdan Slyvinskyi	$177,562	(United States) Demetrius Campbell	(Ring)
August 21- September 1, 2025 (Ring event)	(United States) New Orleans; Caesars New Orleans	510	$772,650	(United States) Yousef Saleh	$149,268	(United States) Kane Keller	(Ring)
August 18- September 2, 2025 (Ring event)	Kahnawake (Canada); Playground Kahnawake	1,978	C$4,450,500	(Canada) Jacob Hobday	C$620,000	(Canada) Adrian Ottorino	(Ring)
September 4–15, 2025 (Ring event)	(United States) Omaha/Iowa; Horseshoe Council Bluffs	275	$362,390	(United States) Ryan Brown	$85,239	(United States) Christopher Rodriguez	(Ring)
September 11–22, 2025 (Ring event)	(United States) Chicago; Horseshoe Hammond	622	$1,000,000	(United States) Brek Schutten	$185,585	(United States) Brian Craig	(Ring)
September 18–29, 2025 (Ring event)	(United States) Southern Indiana; Caesars Southern Indiana	338	$512,070	(Iran) Hamid Izadi	$111,979	(United States) Maurice Hawkins	(Ring)
September 25- October 6, 2025 (Ring event)	(United States) Northern California; Thunder Valley Casino	646	$1,000,000	(Germany) Andreas Kniep	$185,458	(United States) Benjamin Primus	(Ring)
October 1–13, 2025 (Ring event)	Calgary (Canada); Deerfoot Calgary	910	$1,336,826	(Canada) Travis MacMillan	$224,272	(Canada) Victor Li	(Ring)
October 2–13, 2025 (Ring event)	(United States) Maryland; Horseshoe Casino Baltimore	332	$502,980	(United States) Aaron Pinson	$102,668	(United States) Joshua Mischel	(Ring)
October 9–20, 2025 (Ring event)	(United States) Florida; Harrah's Pompano Beach	820	$1,242,300	(United States) Carter McMahon	$212,703	(United States) Ricardo Eyzaguirre	(Ring)
October 9–21, 2025	Karavas (Cyprus); Merit Royal Diamond Karavas	1,372	$6,517,000	(Germany) Harald Sammer	$1,000,000	(Austria) Daniel Rezaei	
October 23- November 3, 2025 (Ring event)	(United States) Nevada; Caesars Republic Lake Tahoe	463	$660,540	(United States) Evan Sandberg	$125,269	(United States) Francisco Trujillo	(Ring)
October 22- November 4, 2025 (Ring event)	Rozvadov (Czech Republic); King's Casino Rozvadov	544	$1,008,649	(Italy) Claudio Di Giacomo	$191,295	(Germany) Stefano Aprile	(Ring)
October 29- November 10, 2025	(United States) Dallas/Oklahoma; Choctaw Casinos Durant	849	$1,135,113	(United States) Matthew Higgins	$218,436	(United States) Jeremy Bowman	
November 3–18, 2025 (Ring event)	Kahnawake (Canada); Playground Kahnawake	1,483	$2,330,926	(Canada) Kliment Tarmakov	$343,705	(Canada) David Quang	(Ring)
November 6–16, 2025 (Ring event)	Panama City (Panama); Hilton Hotel Panama City	547	$669,800	(Colombia) Jorge Florez	$143,600	(United States) Nicholas Atehortua	(Ring)
November 6–16, 2025 (Ring event)	Middelkerke (Belgium); Partouche Casino Middelkerke	414	$658,146	(Algeria) Omar Lakhdari	$136,427	(Poland) Radoslaw Kopec	(Ring)
November 6–17, 2025 (Ring event)	(United States) Chicago; Grand Victoria Casino Elgin	693	$1,049,895	(Romania) Mihai Taizs	$188,095	(United States) Angel Suarez	(Ring)
November 12–25, 2025 (Ring event)	(United States) Los Angeles; Commerce Casino Los Angeles	820	$1,242,300	(United States) David Gonzalez	$213,524	(Venezuela) Luis Yepez	(Ring)
November 14–24, 2025	Nottingham (England); Dusk Till Dawn Nottingham	845	$1,435,489	(England) Francis Obadun	$247,781	(England) Jack O'Niell	
November 15–23, 2025 (Ring event)	Rosario (Argentina); City Center Rosario	501	$758,013	(Argentina) Gonzalo Velozo	$154,113	(Russia) Román Narulin	(Ring)
November 20- December 2, 2025 (Ring event)	Sydney (Australia); The Star, Sydney Sydney	667	$961,119	(China) Yuanting Wang	$182,879	(Australia) Hussein Salman	(Ring)
November 21- December 2, 2025 (Ring event)	Sanremo (Italy); Sanremo Casino	871	$1,280,437	(France) Gregory Grech	$160,900	(Italy) Luca Bernardis	(Ring)
November 27- December 8, 2025 (Ring event)	(United States) North Carolina; Harrah's Cherokee	1,190	$1,802,850	(United States) Derek Sein-Lwin	$281,514	(United States) Patrick Plott	(Ring)

=== 2026 season ===
Date	Location	Entries	Prize Pool	Winner	Prize	Runner-up	Results
January 1–12 (Ring event)	(United States) Las Vegas, Nevada; Planet Hollywood Las Vegas	616	$933,240	(United States) Darren Rabinowitz	$175,430	(United States) David Dibernardi	(Ring)
January 1–13 (Ring event)	Rozvadov (Czech Republic); King's Casino Rozvadov	692	€1,038,000	(Greece) Georgios Vrakas	€164,000	(Mexico) Jose Casillas	(Ring)
January 7–19 (Ring event)	(United States) Durant, Oklahoma; Choctaw Casinos Durant	922	$1,396,830	(United States) Winston Djonli	$232,680	(United States) Matthew Barnett	(Ring)
January 7–19 (Ring event)	Calgary (Canada); Deerfoot Calgary	1,321	C$2,575,796	(Canada) Senthuran Vijayaratnam	C$396,556	(Canada) Robin Bergren	(Ring)
January 15–26 (Ring event)	(United States) Lincoln, California; Thunder Valley Casino	764	$1,157,460	(United States) Jaime Haletky	$205,460	(United States) Franklin Chavez	(Ring)
January 16–25 (Ring event)	Marrakesh (Morocco); Es Saadi Gardens & Resort Marrakech	1,694	€2,142,627	(Switzerland) Sandro Carucci	€279,000	(France) Malcolm Franchi	(Ring)
January 22- February 2 (Ring event)	(United States) Tunica, Mississippi; Horseshoe Casino Tunica	433	$655,995	(United States) David Yount	$132,570	(United States) Dustin Murphy	(Ring)
January 29- February 9 (Ring event)	(United States) Pompano Beach, Florida; Harrah's Pompano Beach	925	$1,404,150	(Canada) Zachary Fischer	$233,384	(United States) Nicholas Blumenthal	(Ring)
February 12–23 (Ring event)	(United States) Cherokee, North Carolina; Harrah's Cherokee	1,824	$2,763,360	(United States) Maxwell Guo	$386,231	(United States) Peter Ng	(Ring)
February 19- March 2 (Ring event)	(United States) Baltimore, Maryland; Horseshoe Casino Baltimore	413	$625,695	(United States) Christopher Selami	$128,100	(United States) Manh Nguyen	(Ring)
February 26- March 9 (Ring event)	(United States) Hammond, Indiana; Horseshoe Hammond	741	$1,122,615	(United States) Richard Bai	$197,299	(United States) Cody Brinn	(Ring)
March 5–10 (Ring event)	Gamprin (Liechtenstein); Grand Casino Liechtenstein Gamprin	827	$1,373,089	(France) Benjamin Hammann	$243,914	(Romania) Neculai Macovei	(Ring)
March 5–16 (Ring event)	(United States) Tulsa, Oklahoma; Hard Rock Hotel & Casino	478	$724,170	(United States) Robert Shuptrine	$142,758	(United States) Christopher Stewart	(Ring)
March 12–23 (Ring event)	(United States) Verona, New York; Turning Stone Casino	1,114	$1,687,710	(United States) Zachary VanKeuren	$267,437	(United States) Adam Kurnitz	(Ring)
March 13–21 (Ring event)	Amsterdam (Netherlands); Holland Amsterdam	881	€1,141,776	(Portugal) Pedro Jorge	€201,276	(Netherlands) Yigal Yifrah	(Ring)
March 19–30 (Ring event)	(United States) Las Vegas, Nevada; Horseshoe Las Vegas	661	$1,001,415	(Venezuela) Luis Yepez	$181,740	(United States) Patrick Truong	(Ring)
March 23- April 7 (Ring event)	Kahnawake (Canada); Playground Kahnawake	1,781	C$4,144,323	(Canada) Allen Shen	C$605,001	(China) Pei Li	(Ring)
April 2–13 (Ring event)	(United States) Elgin, Illinois; Grand Victoria Casino Elgin	593	$898,395	(United States) Grant Juric	$167,608	(United States) Lee Rzentkowski	(Ring)
April 10–21 (Ring event)	Aix-en-Provence (France); Pasino Partouche	783	€1,014,768	(France) Matthieu Cartillier	€150,000	(France) Michel Leibgorin	(Ring)
April 16–27 (Ring event)	(United States) Tunica, Mississippi; Horseshoe Casino Tunica	340	$515,100	(United States) Preston McEwen	$108,853	(United States) Charles Hopper	(Ring)
April 16–27 (Ring event)	(United States) Stateline, Nevada; Caesars Republic Lake Tahoe	463	$701,445	(United States) Adam Nattress	$139,614	(United States) Ryan Hart	(Ring)
April 23-May 4 (Ring event)	(United States) Austin, Texas; Texas Card House	1,709	$2,589,135	(United States) Thomas Brabham	$368,545	(Azerbaijan) David Mzareulov	(Ring)
May 7–18 (Ring event)	(United States) Cherokee, North Carolina; Harrah's Cherokee	1,489	$2,255,835	(Iran) Hamid Izadi	$332,405	(United States) Louis George	(Ring)
May 10–16 (Ring event)	Venlo (Netherlands); Holland Casino Venlo	851	€1,114,684	(Germany) Martin Lenoch	€200,384	(Germany) Lorenz Freitag	(Ring)
May 10–25 (Ring event)	Kahnawake (Canada); Playground Kahnawake	1,022	C$2,250,342	(Canada) Daniel Ghionoiu	C$370,002	(Canada) Daniel Tsipris	(Ring)
May 14–25 (Ring event)	(United States) New Orleans, Louisiana; Caesars New Orleans	420	$636,300	(United States) Corey Harrison	$122,221	(United States) Philip Lucia	(Ring)
July 14–25 (Ring event)	(United States) Las Vegas, Nevada; Horseshoe Las Vegas	936	$1,418,040	(United States) Matthew Blagg	$238,470	(United States) Eric Yanovsky	(Ring)
July 15-27 (Ring event)	(United States) Durant, Oklahoma; Choctaw Casinos Durant	1,117	$1,692,255	(United States) Carson Wieland	$268,245	(United States) Alexander Ho	(Ring)
July 24- August 4 (Ring event)	Tallinn (Estonia); Olympic Park Tallinn	977	€1,253,003	(Germany) Julian Selinger	€210,000	(Netherlands) Roy van der Reijnst	(Ring)
July 31- August 10	Samorin (Slovakia); Card Casino Šamorín	1,160	€1,472,120	(Romania) Alexandru Popa	€235,000	(Ukraine) Rostyslav Sabishchenko	
August 28-31 (Ring event)	(United States) Tunica, Mississippi; Horseshoe Casino Tunica	367	$556,005	(United States) Matthew Higgins	$110,851	(United States) Daniel Garner	(Ring)
September 3–10 (Ring event)	Kahnawake (Canada); WSOP Super Circuit Playground	2,844	C$12,689,928	(Canada) Mayukh Chakraborty	C$1,500,000	(Canada) Benjamin Veenstra	(Ring)
September 4–7 (Ring event)	(United States) Tulsa, Oklahoma; Hard Rock Hotel & Casino	376	$569,640	(United States) Jesse Jones	$112,945	(United States) Dave Alfa	(Ring)
September 5-11 (Ring event)	Mexico City (Mexico); Big Bola Casinos Mexico City	781	M$17,844,288	(Mexico) Roberto Suarez	M$3,200,00	(Mexico) Pablo Perez	(Ring)
September 6-14 (Ring event)	Paris (France); Partouche Casino Club Paris	1,282	€1,661,472	(France) Pierre Chevalier	€260,000	(France) Herve Gouzil	(Ring)
September 10–14 (Ring event)	(United States) Danville, Virginia; Caesars Virginia	665	$1,007,475	(United States) Valentin Lita	$181,853	(United States) Marshall White	(Ring)
September 17–21 (Ring event)	(United States) Austin, Texas; THC Texas House Card	2,090	$3,166,350	(United States) Eric Chang	$433,670	(United States) Anil Jivani	(Ring)
September 17-22 (Ring event)	Gamprin (Liechtenstein); Grand Casino Liechtenstein Gamprin	487	SFr 760,752	(Austria) Andreas Fröhli	SFr150,000	(Switzerland) Riccardo Gubser	(Ring)
September 25-28, 2025 (Ring event)	(United States) Omaha/Iowa; Horseshoe Council Bluffs						(Ring)
September 30- October 4 (Ring event)	St Julian's (Malta); Casino Malta St. Julian's	879	€1,115,451	(Italy) Luca Topazio	€200,000	(Poland) Radoslaw Kopec	(Ring)
October 2-5 (Ring event)	(United States) Lincoln, California; Thunder Valley Casino	599	$907,485	(United States) Manjunath Mulinti	$172,325	(United States) Jesse Stephens	(Ring)
October 8-12 (Ring event)	Calgary (Canada); Deerfoot Calgary	850	C$1,762,050	(India) Kalyan Chakravarthy Cheekuri	C$297,359	(Canada) Tommy Nguyen	(Ring)
January 29- February 9 (Ring event)	(United States) Pompano Beach, Florida; Harrah's Pompano Beach	1,011	$1,531,675	(United States) Robert Gianquitti	$248,632	(United States) Nagui Yassa	(Ring)
October 22-26 (Ring event)	(United States) Verona, New York; Turning Stone Casino	996	$1,508,940	(United States) Kyle Grupp	$246,362	(United States) Joel Cattelane	(Ring)
October 28 (Ring event)	Madrid (Spain); Casino de Madrid Madrid						(Ring)
February 26- March 9 (Ring event)	(United States) Elizabeth, Indiana; Caesars Southern Indiana						(Ring)
November 2–17	Kahnawake (Canada); Playground Kahnawake						
November 6-15	Middelkerke (Belgium); Casino Middelkerke						
November 20-30	Sanremo (Italy); Casino Sanremo						

* more venues to be added in 2026
