= 2005–06 World Series of Poker Circuit =

Series of poker tournaments

The 2005–06 World Series of Poker Circuit is the 2nd annual World Series of Poker Circuit.

== Event schedule ==
Date	Location	Winner	Prize	Runner-up	Other Finalists
August 25, 2005	Grand Casino Tunica	Gregg Merkow	$561,175	Robert Law	Sonny Perry; Jeff Wood; Steve Rassi; Bryant King; Johnny Clements; John Juanda; Darrell Struck
September 16, 2005	Harrah's Las Vegas	Chris Ferguson	$362,088	Chade Layne	Kevin Song; Tom Pniak; An Tran; Gregg Fund; Mike Fetter; Tom Foley; Jim McCrink
November 2, 2005	Caesars Indiana	Vinny Vinh	$437,760	Men Nguyen	Ron Hargrove; Sam Whitt; Douglas Carli; Bill Edler; Marlowe Rowe; John Smith; Clinton Keown
November 22, 2005	Paris Las Vegas	Thang Pham	$453,456	J. C. Tran	Lee Watkinson; Scotty Nguyen; Joe Hachem; John Smith; Steven Hudak; Doug Lee; Minh Ly
December 9, 2005	Showboat Casino, Atlantic City	Chris Reslock	$335,235	John Juanda	Chad Moore; Nick Schulman; John Spadavecchia; Daniel Tolly; Eric Panayiotou; Julian Studley; Daniel Shak
January 26, 2006	Grand Casino Tunica	Daniel Negreanu	$755,525	Bryant King	Kianoosh Mohajeri; Lee Markholt; Brian Lamkin; Brandon Adams; Wendell Barnes; Robert Schulze; Chad Brown
February 17, 2006	Harrah's Atlantic City	Abraham Korotki	$433,008	Brian Jensen	Steven Jacobs; Jody Garaventa; Herbet Cheng; Ed Corrado; Earnest Shepherd; Harry White; Jianhua Zhou
March 7, 2006	Harrah's Rincon	Darrell Dicken	$372,780	Weikai Chang	Kathy Liebert; Gary Lent; Jim Pechac; Adam Kagin; Andy Bloch; Yosh Nakano; Tom McCormick
March 31, 2006	Caesars Atlantic City	Jeffrey King	$345,708	Rep Porter	Jamie Ligator; Ben Bianco; Eric Panayiotou; Chris Ferguson; Herbert Cheng; Mickey Appleman; Louie Esposito
May 11, 2006	Caesars Palace	John Spadavecchia	$648,320	Sean McCabe	Ralph Perry; Danny Fuhs; Billy Baxter; Bob Bright; Tom Schneider; Tony Cousineau; Blair Rodman
May 28, 2006	Harrah's New Orleans	Peter Feldman	$532,950	Gavin Smith	Matt Russell; George Abdallah; Kenny Brown; Dana Diephouse; Allie Prescott; Benjamin Gordon; David Babin
June 19, 2006	Harrah's Lake Tahoe	Clint Baskin	$372,240	Brian Fidler	Tony Le; R. C. W. Cheung; Justin Scott; J. C. Tran; Joseph Dubois; Matt Russell; Jamin Stokes
