= 2006–07 World Series of Poker Circuit =

Series of poker tournaments

The 2006–07 World Series of Poker Circuit is the third annual World Series of Poker Circuit.

== Event schedule ==
Date	Location	Winner	Prize	Runner-up	Other Finalists
September 17, 2006	Harrah's Lake Tahoe	Michael Arents	$196,005	Jerrt Renfroe	Darrell Steed; Randy Gil; Travis Erdman; Burt Boutin; Brendan Lynch; Scott Clements; Paul Kobel
October 4, 2006	Grand Casino Tunica	Mark Smith	$306,003	Manelic Minaya	Glyn Banks; Harold Mahaffey; Jody Stanfill; Jae Chang; Hoyt Lance; Ryan Lenaghan; Ronald Huerkamp
November 3, 2006	Caesars Indiana	Chad Batista	$262,002	Hoyt Lance	Ed Corrado; Hilbert Shirey; Douglas Carli; Joel Casper; Robert Arthur; William Brown; Thomas Fuller
December 19, 2006	Harrah's Atlantic City	Rick Rossetti	$368,096	Alex Gomez	John Racener; Feming Chan; Ken Goldin; Michael Bernstein; Ray Lin; Drew Gliem; Tam Ly
January 17, 2007	Grand Tunica	Dennis Perry	$563,402	Gioi Luong	Lance Allred; Larry Vance; Peter Martin; Michael Mizrachi; Matt Dean; Andi Chang; Elvin Simpson
February 7, 2007	Horseshoe Council Bluffs	Kosta Sengos	$219,576	Paul Kraus	Sam Von Duhn; Jeff Banghart; Doug Carli; Larry Vance; John Kincaid; Thadd Wolff; Everett Carlton
February 22, 2007	Harrah's Rincon	Peter Feldman	$372,780	Davidson Matthew	Gavin Griffin; Danny Wong; Erik Cajelais; Shane Schleger; Gavin Smith; Yoon Kim; Jerry Renfroe
March 14, 2007	Caesars Atlantic City	Mehrdad Yousefzadeh	$488,828	John McMahon	Eugene Fouksman; Frank Vizza; Matt Brady; Rick Austin; David Fox; Grant Lang; Chuck Norris
April 6, 2007	Caesars Indiana	Men Nguyen	$238,756	Young Phan	Bryan Sapp; Tim McCarthy; Dennis Anness; Steve Boyle; George Lusby; Dean Schultz; Scott Fischman
May 2, 2007	Caesars Las Vegas	Cory Carroll	$505,176	Justin Pechie	Eric Davis; Vasile Buboi; Paul Kitsos (dec.); David Pham; Steve Wong; Michelle Law; Chad Brown
May 23, 2007	Harrah's New Orleans	Louie Esposito	$516,801	Clint Schafer	David Fox; Phil Gordon; Anthony Longoria; JD Estilette; David McLeroy; Bobby Wisiak; Scott Mitchell
