= Vornicu =

Vornicu may refer to:

- Valentin Vornicu (born 1983), Romanian poker player and mathematician
- Vornicu River, river in Romania
