= Tal Herzog =

Israeli poker player

Tal Herzog טל הרצוג
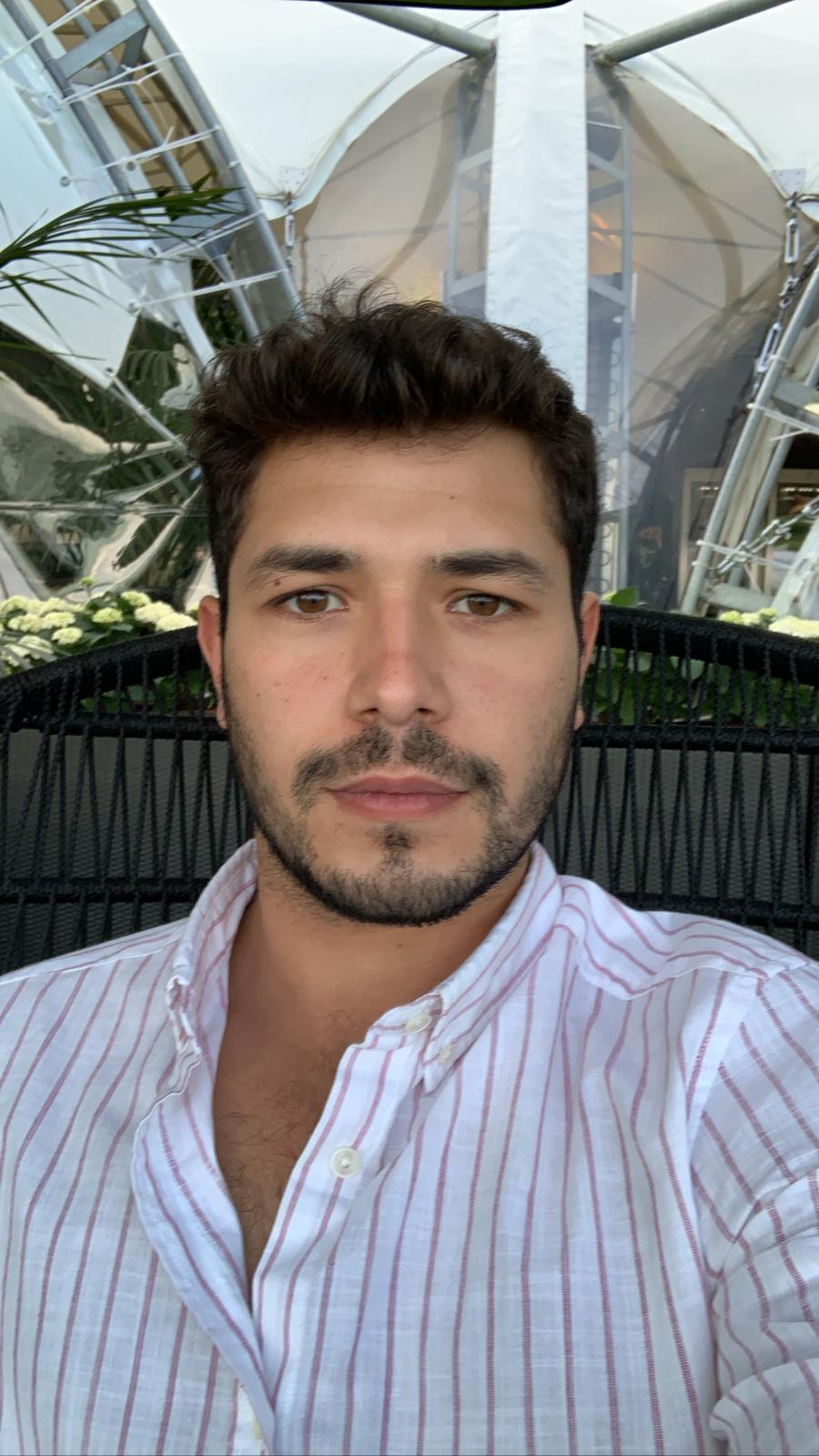
- Tal Herzog, Israeli professional poker player
- Nickname: Turkey1
- Born: 1996 (age 29–30); Israel

World Poker Tour
- Title: Second place at the World Series of Poker Winter Online Circuit.
- Money finishes: 923,165$

Tal Herzog (Hebrew: טל הרצוג), is an Israeli professional poker player, from Caesarea. Herzog won second place at the main event of the World Series of Poker Winter Online Circuit.

== Early life and education ==
Herzog was born in Israel, in 1996. He served in the 202nd Paratroopers Brigade "Viper" of the Israel Defense Forces. After finishing his military service, Herzog studied psychology. He recently became the professional manager of the soon-to-be-launched theAcademy.Poker.

== Career ==
Herzog first cashed in a major poker tournament in the 2020 WSOP Online. In 2021, going by the moniker “Turkey1”, he won $923,165 and 2nd place at the main event World Series of Poker Winter Online Circuit.

== World Series of Poker wins ==
Year	Tournament	Prize (US$)
2020	WSOPC #18: $1,700 MAIN EVENT	923,165$
