= Michael Lech =

American poker player

- Nickname: miguelfiesta

World Series of Poker
- Bracelets: 2
- Final tables: 9
- Money finishes: 203
- Highest WSOP Main Event finish: 138th, 2019

World Poker Tour
- Title: None
- Final table: None
- Money finishes: 2

European Poker Tour
- Title: None
- Final table: None
- Money finish: 1
- World Series of Poker Circuit
- Circuit ring(s): 9
- Final table(s): 35

Michael Lech is an American semi-professional online poker player and pro-am live poker player who has won two bracelets online and numerous circuit rings live.

== Early life ==
=== Birth ===
Lech originally hails from Alma, Alabama, a tiny, unincorporated town with a population of 600.

=== Education ===
Lech has a degree in International Business from the University of Arkansas.

== World Series of Poker Circuit ==
Lech is the holder of nine circuit rings with his best cash of the amateur tour including an outright win in the $2,200 No Limit Hold'em High Roller (Event #9) ($106,377) at the WSOPC New Orleans (2017).

== World Series of Poker ==
Lech won his maiden bracelet in the $1,500 No Limit Hold'em - High Roller Freezeout (Event #13) (Online) ($164,249) at the 2020 World Series of Poker Online, with his biggest cash to date from a runner-up finish in the $888 No Limit Hold'em Crazy Eights 8-Handed (re-entry) (Event #54) ($401,888) at the 2016 World Series of Poker.

Lech added another top 3 finishing to his resume in the $400 No Limit Hold'em - 8-Max (Online Bracelet Event 5) ($65,383) at the 2023 World Series of Poker.

Lech won his second bracelet in the $500 No Limit Hold'em - PKO (Online Bracelet Event #3) ($7,605) at the 2024 World Series of Poker.

== World Series of Poker Main Event ==
=== World Series of Poker Live Main Event ===
Lech has three cashes in the Main Event with finishings of 138th ($59,295; 2019), 391st ($28,356; 2016), and 881st ($15,000; 2021).

=== World Series of Poker Online Main Event ===
Lech has two cashes in the Main Event (Online) including a 31st place in 2020 for $55,880, and a 98th-place finish in 2021 for $29,532.

== Career earnings ==
As of July 2024, Lech's total live tournament winnings exceeds $1,650,000.
