= Roland Israelashvili =

American poker player

- Born: Republic of Georgia

World Series of Poker
- Money finishes: 240
- Highest WSOP Main Event finish: 25th, 2012

World Poker Tour
- Money finishes: 7
World Series of Poker Circuit
- Circuit ring(s): 11
- Money finish(es): 266

Roland Israelashvili is a professional poker player from Forest Hills, New York. He was born in the Republic of Georgia.

== Poker career ==
Israelashvili made his first major poker cash in July 2005 at the World Series of Poker (WSOP) with a 31st-place finish in a $3,000 No Limit Hold'em event. Later that series, he had a 37th-place finish out of 5,619 entries in the Main Event for $235,390. He earned his first major tournament victory at the 2009 World Poker Finals in Mashantucket in a Seven Card Stud 8 tournament. In March 2010, he won his first WSOP Circuit Ring in the Main Event in Atlantic City for $264,715. Later that year, he had his deepest run in a WSOP Main Event with a 25th-place finish in 2012. In June 2012, at the WSOP, he had his largest cash to date with a fifth-place finish in The Poker Players Championship for $317,882. In January 2017, he won a $3,000 No Limit Hold'em event at the PokerStars Championship at the Bahamas for $72,550. He is the all-time leader in combined cashes in all WSOP events.

Israelashvili has won 11 WSOP circuit rings over his career.

As of 2025, Israelashvili's total live poker tournament winnings exceed $4,800,000.
