= 2010–11 World Series of Poker Circuit =

Series of poker tournaments

The 2010–11 World Series of Poker Circuit was the 7th annual World Series of Poker Circuit.

Starting with the 2011 WSOP Circuit, the Circuit National Championship was held as a closed event for participants of various circuit events. The first Circuit National Championship was held at Caesars Palace in Las Vegas. The winner of this event received a World Series of Poker bracelet—the first ever to be awarded in an event other than the main Las Vegas World Series of Poker or the World Series of Poker Europe.

The first to get a WSOP bracelet by winning a WSOP Circuit National Championship was Sam Barnhart, who won the 100-qualifier event from May 27 - May 29, 2011.

== Event schedule ==
=== WSOP Circuit National Championship ===
- 3-Day Event: May 27 - May 29
- Number of Entries: 97 (100 qualified, but 3 failed to show)
- Total Prize Pool: $970,000
- Number of Payouts: 10
- Winning Hand: K♠ Q♣

Final Table
Place	Name	Prize
1st	Sam Barnhart (1/1)	$300,000
2nd	Jim Anderson	$200,000
3rd	Josh Evans	$135,000
4th	La Sengphet	$100,000
5th	Jonathan Poche	$75,000
6th	Charles “Woody” Moore	$55,000
7th	Drazen Ilich	$42,500
8th	Adam Hui	$35,000
9th	Matt Lawrence	$30,000
