= Schur's inequality =

Mathematical inequality

In mathematics, Schur's inequality, named after Issai Schur, establishes that for all non-negative real numbers x, y, z, and t,

$$x^t (x-y)(x-z) + y^t (y-z)(y-x) + z^t (z-x)(z-y) \ge 0$$

with equality if and only if x = y = z or two of them are equal and the other is zero. When t is an even positive integer, the inequality holds for all real numbers x, y and z.

When $t=1$, the following well-known special case can be derived:

$$x^3 + y^3 + z^3 + 3xyz \geq xy(x+y) + xz(x+z) + yz(y+z)$$

== Proof ==
Since the inequality is symmetric in $x,y,z$ we may assume without loss of generality that $x \geq y \geq z$. If $t \geq 0$ the inequality

$$(x-y)[x^t(x-z)-y^t(y-z)]+z^t(x-z)(y-z) \geq 0$$

clearly holds, since every term on the left-hand side of the inequality is non-negative. This rearranges to Schur's inequality. Similarly, when $t < 0$,

$$(y - z)\bigl[z^t(x - z) - y^t(x - y)\bigr] + x^t(x - y)(x - z) \geq 0$$

This is also clearly true because the left-hand side consists of every term being non-negative.

== Extensions ==
A generalization of Schur's inequality is the following: Suppose a,b,c are positive real numbers. If the triples (a,b,c) and (x,y,z) are similarly sorted, then the following inequality holds:

$$a (x-y)(x-z) + b (y-z)(y-x) + c (z-x)(z-y) \ge 0.$$

In 2007, Romanian mathematician Valentin Vornicu showed that a yet further generalized form of Schur's inequality holds:

Consider $a,b,c,x,y,z \in \mathbb{R}$, where $a \geq b \geq c$, and either $x \geq y \geq z$ or $z \geq y \geq x$. Let $k \in \mathbb{Z}^{+}$, and let $f:\mathbb{R} \rightarrow \mathbb{R}_{0}^{+}$ be either convex or monotonic. Then,

$${f(x)(a-b)^k(a-c)^k+f(y)(b-a)^k(b-c)^k+f(z)(c-a)^k(c-b)^k \geq 0}.$$

The standard form of Schur's is the case of this inequality where x = a, y = b, z = c, k = 1, ƒ(m) = m^{r}.

Another possible extension states that if the non-negative real numbers $x \geq y \geq z \geq v$ and the positive real number t are such that x + v ≥ y + z, then

$$x^t (x-y)(x-z)(x-v) + y^t (y-x)(y-z)(y-v) + z^t (z-x)(z-y)(z-v) + v^t (v-x)(v-y)(v-z) \ge 0.$$
