= 2005 World Series of Poker Circuit =

Series of poker tournaments

The 2005 World Series of Poker Circuit is the first annual World Series of Poker Circuit.

== Event schedule ==
The following events took place in the build-up to the 2005 World Series of Poker. The money finishers in each event qualified for the World Series of Poker Tournament of Champions. The buy-in for the 2005 events was $10,000.

All tournaments were broadcast as a part of the ESPN coverage of the 2005 WSOP. The first tournament was split over two episodes.

Date	Location	Winner	Prize	Runner-up	Other Finalists
January 18, 2005	Harrah's Atlantic City	Nghi Tran	$780,615	Erick Lindgren	Nick Frangos; Mimi Tran; Aaron Bartley; Stan Goldstein; Chad Brown; Chris Ferguson; Michael Esposito
March 2, 2005	Harrah's Rincon	Chris Ferguson	$655,220	Prahlad Friedman	Chad Brown; James Worth; Alex Prendes Jr; Keith Sexton; Robert Williamson III; Lonnie Alexander; Mark Hanna
March 23, 2005	Rio All Suite Hotel and Casino Las Vegas	Doug Lee	$695,970	Jennifer Harman	Jean-Robert Bellande; Gabe Thaler; Grant Lang; Kevin Keller; Dennis Perry; Phil Ivey; Tom Macey
May 8, 2005	Harrah's Lake Tahoe	Jeff Lisandro	$542,360	Phil Ivey	James Van Alstyne; Jonathan Shecter; Tommy Reed; Salim Batshon; David Pham; George Saca; Joe Awada
May 28, 2005	Harrah's New Orleans	Walter Chambers	$787,340	Corey Bierria	Antonio Esfandiari; Nick Mao; Mark Cole; Harry Cullen Jr; Imre Leibold; Marlon Labbe; Cyril Gittens
