= Blair Hinkle =

American poker player (born 1986)

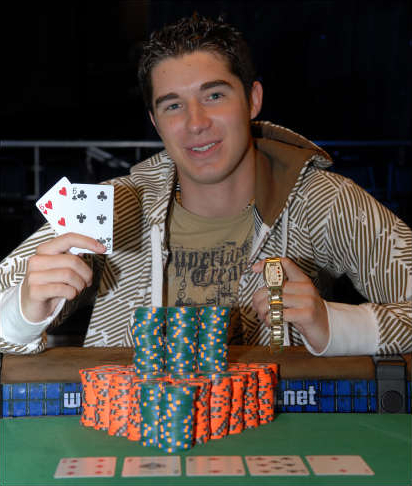
- Hinkle after he won the $2,000 No-Limit Hold'em event at the 2008 World Series of Poker
- Nickname: Blur5f6
- Born: 1986 (age 39–40)

World Series of Poker
- Bracelet: 1
- Money finishes: 58
- Highest WSOP Main Event finish: 129th, 2009

World Poker Tour
- Title: None
- Final table: None
- Money finishes: 14

Blair Hinkle (born 1986) is an American online high-stakes poker player and live midstakes poker player who won the 2008 World Series of Poker (WSOP) $2,000 No-Limit Hold'em event. He earned $507,613 at the event. Less than two weeks earlier his brother, Grant Hinkle, also won a WSOP bracelet in the $1,500 No-Limit Hold'em event making them the first brothers to each win a bracelet in the same year.

On November 7, 2007, Hinkle won the first event in the sixth Full Tilt Online Poker Series, a $216 buy in No Limit Hold'em tournament. He bested a field of 3,676 players to win the $146,288 1st prize.

On February 20, 2011, Hinkle finished second in the nineteenth Full Tilt Online Poker Series Main Event. A $640 No Limit Hold'em tournament where players were allowed to register up to 6 times, Hinkle won the most in a three-way deal securing $1,162,949.74, the largest prize to one individual in the site's history.

On August 22, 2013, Hinkle won the $5,300 Seminole Hard Rock Poker Open Main Event for $1,745,245.

As of 2023, Hinkle's total live tournament winnings exceed $5,000,000. His 58 WSOP cashes account for $1,697,613 of those winnings.

== World Series of Poker bracelets ==
Year	Event	Prize Money
2008	$2,000 No-Limit Hold'em	$507,613
