= Tony Cousineau =

American poker player

World Series of Poker
- Bracelet: None
- Money finishes: 72
- Highest WSOP Main Event finish: None

World Poker Tour
- Title: None
- Final table: None
- Money finishes: 16

European Poker Tour
- Title: None
- Final table: None
- Money finish: 1

Anthony Cousineau is an American professional poker player from Daytona Beach, Florida who has cashed over 100 times at the World Series of Poker (WSOP).

As of 2024, his total live tournament winnings exceed $2,900,000. His 72 cashes at the WSOP account for over $1,000,000 of those winnings.
