= Seminole Casino Coconut Creek =

Casino in Florida, United States

- Location within Florida
- Interactive map of Seminole Casino Coconut Creek
- Location: Coconut Creek, Florida; 5550 NW 40th St, Coconut Creek, FL 33073; 26.2785°N 80.1990°W
- Casino type: Native American casino
- Owner: Seminole Tribe of Florida
- Operating license holder: Seminole Gaming
- Website: casino.hardrock.com/coconut-creek/

The Seminole Casino Coconut Creek is a casino located in Coconut Creek, Florida owned and managed by the Seminole Tribe of Florida.

== History ==
=== Origins and controversy ===
The casino was initially proposed as a bingo hall and a card room, but it added slots in 2000. There was local pushback to the addition of slot machines, with fears that the bingo hall would turn into a casino. At the time, the prevailing legal theory within the government of Florida was that the Seminole Tribe could not open a casino without the permission of the Governor of Florida, then Jeb Bush. Bush had stated that he would not grant a license to the Seminole Tribe for a casino to open; however, the Department of the Interior under Bruce Babbitt began the process of allowing for Native American casinos regardless of state law, as that would override local and state laws, due to tribal sovereignty and the Indian Gaming Regulatory Act. This was largely due to early efforts by the Seminole Tribe to legalize gambling in Florida. In 1979, the tribe controversially opened a bingo hall in Hollywood, Florida on the Hollywood Seminole Indian Reservation. The result of that was the lawsuit Seminole Tribe v. Butterworth, in which the United States Court of Appeals for the Fifth Circuit ruled that the tribe was allowed to run a bingo hall. The ruling found that the restrictions Florida was attempting to impose over the tribe was outside of its remit. This is because Native American reservations hold tribal sovereignty that can only be restricted by the United States Congress. The only regulation that Congress had passed relevant to this relating to the Seminole's sovereignty was Public Law 280, which gave Florida some civil jurisdiction on reservations. The Fifth Circuit found that bingo was considered to be under civil jurisdiction and that Florida's attempted regulation of Seminole bingo was outside of its civil jurisdiction allowed by Public Law 280. This allowed for the Seminole Tribe to open further bingo halls, including the bingo hall in Coconut Creek that eventually became the Seminole Casino Coconut Creek.

=== Expansion to table games and sports betting ===
The casino has since expanded significantly to have table games as well as sports betting, both of which were added in 2023, following the 2021 signing of a 30-year agreement relating to gambling between the Seminole Tribe and the government of Florida.
