= IP Casino Resort Spa =

Resort in Biloxi, Mississippi

Coordinates: 30°24′45″N 88°53′27″W

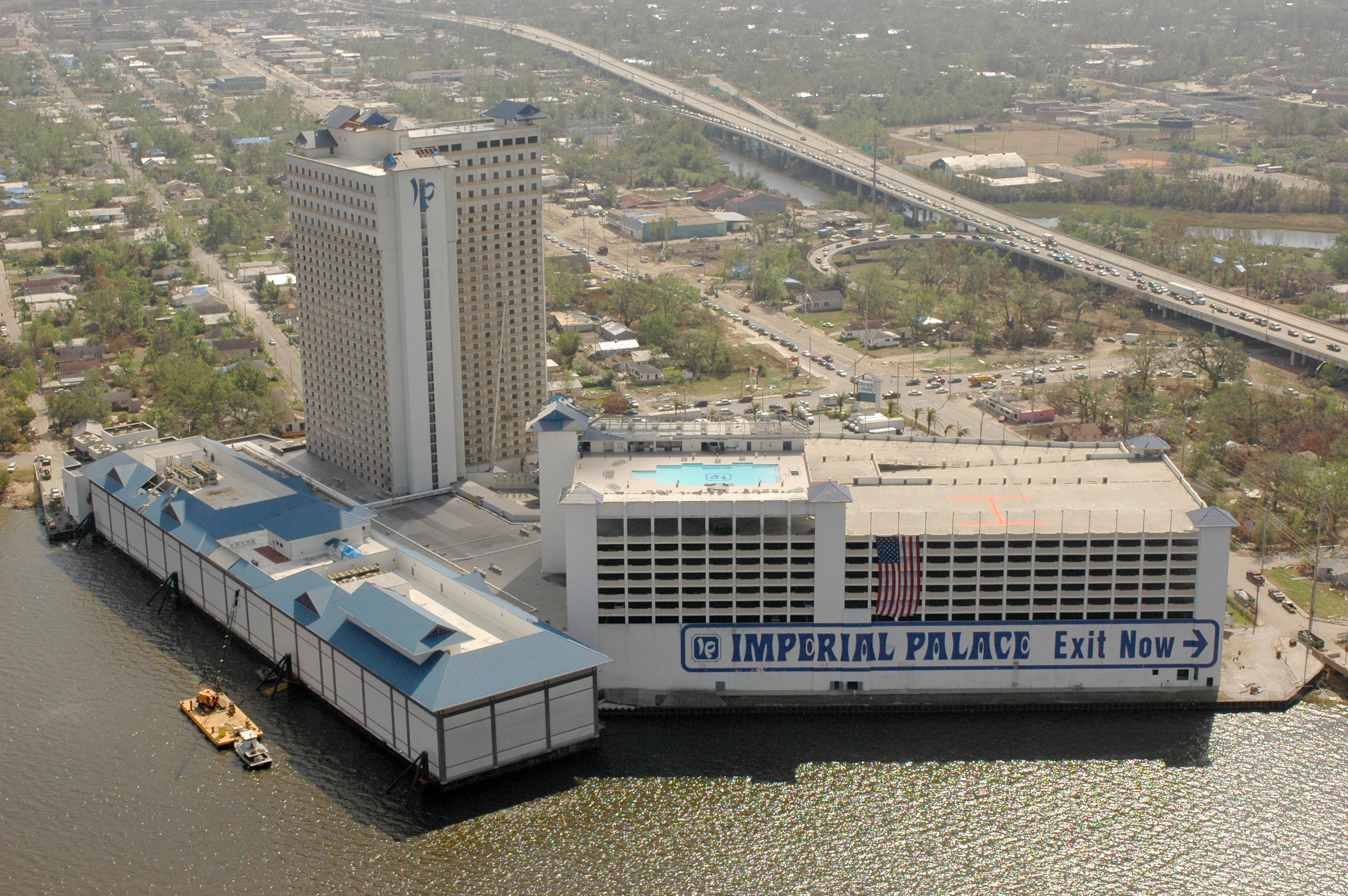
- The hotel in October 2005 when it was still Imprerial Palace, then in use as a post-Hurricane Katrina regional operations base for FEMA. It was one of the few large casino hotels in the area to suffer little damage in the storm.
- Interactive map of IP Casino Resort Spa
- Location: 850 Bayview Avenue Biloxi, MS 39530-1701
- Opened: December 22, 1997
- No. of rooms: 1,088
- Gaming space: 84,225 sq ft (7,824.8 m^{2})
- Permanent shows: Studio A
- Casino type: Land & Dockside
- Owner: Boyd Gaming
- Previous names: Imperial Palace Hotel and Casino Biloxi; IP Hotel and Casino
- Renovated in: 2005 & current showroom renovation
- Public transit access: CTA
- Website: www.ipbiloxi.com

The IP Casino Resort Spa is a resort located in Biloxi, Mississippi. It was founded by Minnesota businessman Ralph Engelstad.

== History ==
The property opened for business officially on December 22, 1997, as the Imperial Palace Hotel and Casino Biloxi. It was the sister property of the Imperial Palace on the Las Vegas Strip, in Paradise, Nevada. When Engelstad died in 2002, ownership of both properties transferred to trustees of his estate, including wife Betty Engelstad. The Las Vegas property was sold to Harrah's Entertainment in 2005.

Boyd Gaming bought the IP in October 2011 for $278 million in cash, plus a $10 million donation to the Engelstad Family Foundation.
