= Horseshoe Council Bluffs =

Casino in Council Bluffs, Iowa; opened 1986

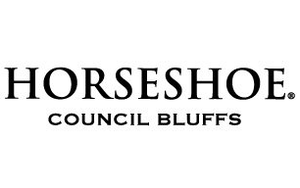
- Interactive map of Horseshoe Council Bluffs
- Location: Council Bluffs, Iowa, U.S.; 2701 23rd Avenue; 41.239954°N 95.885363°W
- Opened: February 27, 1986; 40 years ago
- Theme: Old West and Pavilion
- No. of rooms: 153
- Gaming space: 68,000 sq ft (6,300 m^{2})
- Signature attractions: Hilton Garden Inn
- Notable restaurants: Jack Binion's Cafe; Jack Binion's Steak House; Village Square Buffet
- Owner: Vici Properties
- Operating license holder: Caesars Entertainment
- Previous names: Bluffs Run Greyhound Park
- Renovated in: 1995, 2006
- Website: caesars.com/horseshoe-council-bluffs

Horseshoe Council Bluffs is a casino and former greyhound racing track in Council Bluffs, Iowa. It is owned by Vici Properties and operated by Caesars Entertainment. It has 60,000 sq ft (5,600 m^{2}) of gaming space with 1,438 slot machines, 63 table games, a William Hill racebook, and a WSOP poker room. Accommodations are offered at an adjoining Hilton Garden Inn, and the nearby Country Inns & Suites, Holiday Inn Express and SpringHill Suites.

The Horseshoe holds the World Series of Poker Circuit Event during August of each calendar year, and the Horseshoe Poker Championships (HPC) during February in each year in their poker room.

Bluffs Run Greyhound Park opened in 1986. In March 1995, slot machines were added and the property became Bluffs Run Casino. Harveys Casino Resorts bought the property in 1999 for $165 million. Harrah's Entertainment (now Caesars Entertainment) acquired Harveys in 2001. In 2006, Harrah's completed an $85-million expansion and renovation of the casino and rebranded it as Horseshoe Council Bluffs. Greyhound racing ended in 2015. On October 6, 2017, ownership of the property was transferred to Vici Properties as part of a corporate spin-off, and it was leased back to Caesars Entertainment.
