= Grant Hinkle =

American poker player

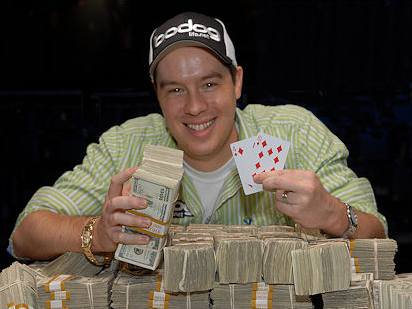
- Hinkle after winning the $1,500 No Limit Hold'em at the 2008 World Series of Poker
- Nickname: GrantMasterFlash

World Series of Poker
- Bracelet: 1
- Money finishes: 10
- Highest WSOP Main Event finish: 391st, 2013

European Poker Tour
- Title: None
- Final table: None
- Money finish: 1

Grant Hinkle is an American poker player who won the 2008 World Series of Poker (WSOP) $1,500 No-Limit Hold'em event. He earned $831,462 at the event, bringing his total live tournament winnings to $1,640,843.

Hinkle won his WSOP bracelet at a final table that included 2000 WSOP Main Event winner Chris Ferguson. The event began with 3929 players, at the time the largest ever field for a poker tournament other than the WSOP Main Event.

Hinkle won the bracelet by bluffing his hand of 10♦ 4♦ versus the A♣ K♥ of James Akenhead. Hinkle hit 10♥ 4♥ 10♠ on the flop to give him a full house. He then hit a 10♣ on the turn to secure the four of a kind and the bracelet.

Less than two weeks later WSOP history was made when his brother, Blair Hinkle, also won a WSOP bracelet in the $2,000 No-Limit Hold'em event making them the first brothers to each win a bracelet during the same year.

On August 15, 2006, Hinkle won the third event in the inaugural Full Tilt Online Poker Series, a $216 buy in Limit Hold'em tournament. He bested a field of 726 to win the $34,848 1st prize.
