= Chris Reslock =

American poker player

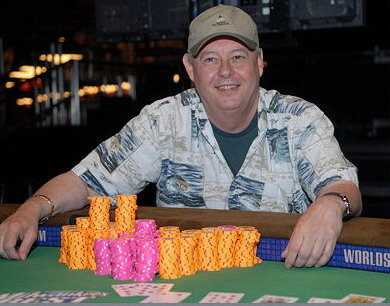
- Reslock at the 2007 World Series of Poker

World Series of Poker
- Bracelet: 1
- Money finishes: 8
- Highest WSOP Main Event finish: None

World Poker Tour
- Title: None
- Final table: None
- Money finish: 1
- World Series of Poker Circuit
- Circuit ring(s): 8
- Battle Royal: 21

Chris J. Reslock is a professional poker player from Valley City, North Dakota, who now lives in Atlantic City, New Jersey. Reslock was a semi-retired cab owner and operator before he began playing poker professionally in the mid-1990s. Before his poker career he was also a highly ranked Scrabble player, at one point holding the official record for the highest points score in the United States, but he went into poker because the money potential was much higher.

Reslock's most notable accomplishments include winning the 2005 World Series of Poker Circuit championship event in no limit Texas hold 'em ($335,235), in which he played professional poker player John Juanda heads-up for the title, winning a bracelet at the 2007 World Series of Poker in the $5,000 World Championship seven-card stud event ($258,453). The final table included several very skilled opponents including Marco Traniello and Phil Ivey whom Reslock defeated in heads-up play.

Reslock also competed in the $50,000 H.O.R.S.E. event at the 2007 WSOP where he finished in 15th place earning $88,800. He also finished runner-up in the 2005 Trump Classic No Limit Hold'em Championship earning $126,000. Reslock finished in 4th place at the 2006 WSOP Tournament of Champions event that was won by poker pro and WPT announcer, Mike Sexton. That final table also featured other well known pro poker players including Daniel Negreanu, Mike Matusow, and 2000 Main Event champion Chris Ferguson.

As of 2019, Reslock's total live tournament winnings exceed $1,900,000.

== World Series of Poker bracelets ==
Year	Event	Prize Money
2007	$5,000 Seven Card Stud	$258,453
