= Valentin Vornicu =

Romanian poker player and mathematician

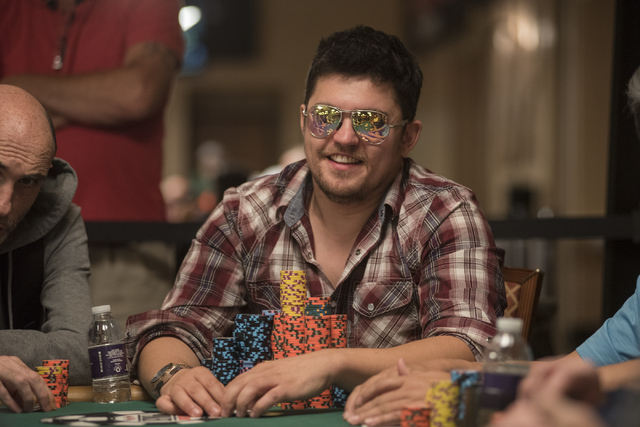
- Valentin Vornicu at the 47th World Series of Poker (WSOP) 2016
- Born: Valentin Vornicu June 13, 1983 (age 43); Bucharest, Romania
- Citizenship: Romanian
- Known for: MathLinks, Art of Problem Solving, Vornicu-Schur theorem
- Awards: Bronze Medal at the International Mathematical Olympiad
- Scientific career
- Fields: Mathematics
- Workplaces: Art of Problem Solving, MathLinks

World Series of Poker
- Bracelet: None
- Final tables: 3
- Money finishes: 49
- Highest WSOP Main Event finish: 23rd, 2016
- World Series of Poker Circuit
- Circuit ring(s): 16

Valentin Vornicu is a mathematician, semi-professional midstakes poker player, and software engineer at Meta, formerly Google. Vornicu holds 16 World Series of Poker circuit rings. Valentin is from Romania and now resides in San Diego, California. Vornicu is the founder of MathLinks, an educational resource company. Before founding MathLinks, he worked as a full-stack engineer for Art of Problem Solving.

== Mathematics and education ==
Vornicu was a part of the Romanian team for the International Mathematics Olympiad (IMO) in 2001 and 2002. In 2002 he earned a bronze medal at the IMO. He graduated at the University of Bucharest in 2006, and got his Master's Degree in Algebra and Number Theory at the same University in 2008. In 2007, Vornicu discovered a generalized form of Schur's inequality, usually cited on online forums as "Vornicu-Schur inequality", which he published in a problem-solving book titled Olimpiada de Matematica.

== Poker ==
Vornicu won 16 WSOP circuit rings, with his biggest score coming in 2015 for $197,110.

In July 2016, he finished 23rd in the 2016 WSOP Main Event for $269,430. He led in chips after day 2 of that event.
