= Shane Schleger =

American poker player (born 1977)

- Nickname: shaniac
- Born: 1977 (age 48–49); New York City, New York, U.S.

World Series of Poker
- Money finishes: 12

World Poker Tour
- Final table: 1
- Money finishes: 4

European Poker Tour
- Money finishes: 3

Shane J. Schleger (born 1977 in New York City, New York) is a former professional poker player from New York City. Schleger was a member of Team PokerStars from 2011 – 2014.

== Career ==
Schleger played online poker under the name shaniac, he made two World Series of Poker (WSOP) final tables as well as a World Poker Tour (WPT) final Table. In October 2013, he made the WCOOP $5,200 buy-in main event final table, placing 6th for $291,000.

Schleger finished fifth place on two separate occasions in the WSOP $1K with Rebuys event (grossing $132,110 in 2005 and $111,445 in 2007). In February 2006, he won $230,000 in a $300 no-limit hold 'em rebuy tournament at the Commerce Casino's LA Poker Classic. In July 2007, he finished fourth at the World Poker Tour (WPT) Bellagio Cup III, cashing for $232,490.

Schleger is a former member of Team PokerStars Online, a group of internet poker players sponsored by the site. On April 15, 2011, a day dubbed Black Friday by online poker players, the Department of Justice unsealed an indictment against the three biggest poker sites, including PokerStars. Schleger was forced to resume his game outside of the United States and played from a base in Mexico.

As of 2016, his total live tournament winnings exceeded $1,400,000.

== Personal life ==
Schleger resides in Santa Monica, California. With a history of mental illness and substance abuse, Schleger has admitted an addiction to crack cocaine stating, "I expect to smoke a lot less crack in 2014 than I did in 2013 but I’d be setting myself up for failure if I made abstinence a goal."
