= Peter Feldman (poker player) =

American poker player

- Nickname: Nordberg

World Series of Poker
- Bracelet: None
- Money finishes: 5
- Highest WSOP Main Event finish: 124th, 2011

World Poker Tour
- Title: None
- Final table: 1
- Money finishes: 4

Peter Feldman is a professional poker player from Harper Woods, Michigan

Feldmans's first major success in poker came in a 2006 World Series of Poker circuit event, where he won the tournament and $532,950. Since then, Feldman has cashed in some World Poker Tour events and in the 2006 and 2007 World Series of Poker Main Event.

As of 2023, his total live tournament winnings exceed $1,500,000.

He was indicted by the FBI in 2013 for racketeering.
