= World Poker Tour season 1 results =

Below are the results of season 1 of the World Poker Tour (2002–2003).

== Results ==
=== Five Diamond World Poker Classic ===
- Casino: Bellagio, Paradise, Nevada
- Buy-in: $10,000
- 5-Day Event: May 27, 2002 to June 1, 2002
- Number of Entries: 146
- Total Prize Pool: $1,391,180
- Number of Payouts: 18
- Winning Hand: K♠ K♣

Final Table
Place	Name	Prize
1st	Gus Hansen	$556,460
2nd	John Juanda	$278,240
3rd	Freddy Deeb	$139,120
4th	John Hennigan	$83,472
5th	Chris Bigler	$62,604
6th	Scotty Nguyen	$48,692
7th	Eli Balas	$34,780
8th	Martin Corpuz	$27,724
9th	David Levi	$22,261
10th	Paul McKinney	$16,694
11th	Michael Sukonik	$16,694
12th	Amir Vahedi	$16,694
13th	Tony Cousineau	$15,303
14th	Hamid Dastmalchi	$15,303
15th	Peter Vilandos	$15,303
16th	Todd Brunson	$13,912
17th	Marsha Waggoner	$13,912
18th	Jonathan Kaplan	$13,912

=== Legends of Poker ===
- Casino: Bicycle Casino, Los Angeles
- Buy-in: $5,000
- 2-Day Event: August 30, 2002 to August 31, 2002
- Number of Entries: 134
- Total Prize Pool: $583,380
- Number of Payouts: 10
- Winning Hand: Q♠ Q♦

Final Table
Place	Name	Prize
1st	Chris Karagulleyan	$258,000
2nd	Hon Le	$122,550
3rd	Stan Goldstein	$61,270
4th	Mark Seif	$38,700
5th	Can Kim Hua	$29,025
6th	Kathy Liebert	$22,575
7th	Paul Darden	$16,125
8th	Phil Hellmuth Jr	$12,900
9th	Scott Brayerr	$11,285
10th	Paul Zibits	$10,950

=== Ultimate Poker Classic ===
- Casino: Palm Beach, Aruba
- Buy-in: $300
- 2-Day Event: October 9, 2002
- Number of Entries: 100
- Total Prize Pool: $74,400
- Number of Payouts: 4
- Winning Hands: Amateur A♥ K♦; Professional A♣ Q♠; Heads-up A♦ J♣

Amateur Final Table
Place	Name	Prize
1st	Juha Helppi	$50,000
2nd	Anssi Tuulivirda	$10,400
3rd	Kathy Liebert	$8,000
4th	Woody Moore	$6,000

- Phil Gordon won the professional division final table for $250,000 in earnings to advance to a special heads-up match against Helppi. Helppi went on to defeat Gordon to earn the $25,000 seat at the season ending WPT Championships.

=== Costa Rica Classic ===
- Casino: Casinos Europa, San José
- Buy-in: $500 w/ $500 Re-buys
- 1-Day Event: October 19, 2002
- Number of Entries: 134
- Total Prize Pool: $234,858
- Number of Payouts: 10
- Winning Hand: J♠ J♦

Final Table
Place	Name	Prize
1st	Jose Rosenkrantz	$108,730
2nd	Jamie Ligator	$45,000
3rd	Luis Milanes	$25,120
4th	Dewey Tomko	$14,650
5th	Jamie Anteneloff	$11,510
6th	R.A. Head	$9,420

=== Gold Rush ===
- Casino: Lucky Chances Casino, Colma, California
- Buy-in: $3,000
- 2-Day Event: November 10, 2002 to November 11, 2002
- Number of Entries: 152
- Total Prize Pool: $456,000
- Number of Payouts: 18
- Winning Hand: Q♦ 8♦

Final Table
Place	Name	Prize
1st	Paul Darden	$146,000
2nd	Chris Bigler	$88,000
3rd	Antonio Esfandiari	$44,000
4th	Phil Hellmuth	$34,000
5th	Vince Burgio	$26,000
6th	Tommy Garza	$21,000

=== World Poker Finals ===
- Casino: Foxwoods Resort Casino, Mashantucket, Connecticut
- Buy-in: $10,000
- 3-Day Event: November 14, 2002 to November 17, 2002
- Number of Entries: 89
- Total Prize Pool: $915,000
- Number of Payouts: 10
- Winning Hand: A♥ 9♥

Final Table
Place	Name	Prize
1st	Howard Lederer	$320,400
2nd	Layne Flack	$186,900
3rd	Andy Bloch	$102,350
4th	Phil Ivey	$75,650
5th	Peter Giordano	$57,850
6th	Ron Rose	$44,500

=== Jack Binion World Poker Open ===
- Casino: Binion's Horseshoe, Tunica, Mississippi
- Buy-in: $10,000
- 4-Day Event: January 28, 2003 to January 31, 2003
- Number of Entries: 160
- Total Prize Pool: $1,600,000
- Number of Payouts: 27
- Winning Hand: 6♠ 5♥

Final Table
Place	Name	Prize
1st	Dave Ulliott	$589,175
2nd	Phil Ivey	$290,130
3rd	Johnny Donaldson	$145,065
4th	Buddy Williams	$91,620
5th	Jeremy Tinsley	$68,715
6th	Tommy Grimes	$53,445

=== Euro Finals of Poker ===
- Casino: Aviation Club de France, Paris
- Buy-in: €10,000 ($10,790)
- 3-Day Event: February 12, 2003 to February 15, 2003
- Number of Entries: 86
- Total Prize Pool: €831,000 ($894,510)
- Number of Payouts: 9
- Winning Hand: K♦ 2♠

Final Table
Place	Name	Prize
1st	Christer Johansson	€500,000 ($538,213)
2nd	Claude Cohen	€160,000 ($172,228)
3rd	Allen Cunningham	€80,000 ($86,114)
4th	Jacques Durand	€32,000 ($34,446)
5th	Tony G	€16,000 ($17,223)
6th	Alain Hagege	€13,000 ($13,994)

=== L.A. Poker Classic ===
- Casino: Commerce Casino, Los Angeles
- Buy-in: $10,000
- 4-Day Event: February 21, 2003 to February 24, 2003
- Number of Entries: 136
- Total Prize Pool: $1,360,000
- Number of Payouts: 20
- Winning Hand: A♠ J♣

Final Table
Place	Name	Prize
1st	Gus Hansen	$532,490
2nd	Daniel Rentzer	$253,595
3rd	Andy Bloch	$125,460
4th	David Pham	$80,080
5th	Steven Shkolnik	$53,390
6th	Bob Stupak	$46,715

=== WPT Invitational ===
- Casino: Commerce Casino, Los Angeles
- Buy-in:
- 1-Day Event: February 25, 2003
- Number of Entries: 136
- Total Prize Pool: $200,000
- Number of Payouts:
- Winning Hand: A♠ Q♠

Final Table
Place	Name	Prize
1st	Layne Flack	$100,000
2nd	Jerry Buss	$40,000
3rd	David Chiu	$20,000
4th	Men Nguyen	$10,000
5th	Tony Ma	$7,000
6th	Andy Glazer	$6,000

=== Party Poker Million ===
- Buy-in: $5,300
- 1-Day Event: March 6, 2003
- Number of Entries: 177
- Total Prize Pool: $1,013,800
- Number of Payouts: 9
- Winning Hand: 10♥ 3♥

Final Table
Place	Name	Prize
1st	Howard Lederer	$289,150
2nd	Chip Jett	$175,900
3rd	Joe Simpkins	$105,540
4th	Maureen Feduniak	$79,155
5th	Tim Lark	$52,770
6th	Daniel Coupal	$43,975

=== World Poker Challenge ===
- Casino: Reno Hilton, Reno
- Buy-in: $5,000
- 3-Day Event: March 31, 2003 to April 2, 2003
- Number of Entries: 87
- Total Prize Pool: $421,746
- Number of Payouts: 9
- Winning Hand: K♠ Q♣

Final Table
Place	Name	Prize
1st	Ron Rose	$168,298
2nd	Cal Dykes	$96,772
3rd	Tony Le	$50,490
4th	Paul Magriel	$29,452
5th	Mark Edwards	$23,140
6th	T. J. Cloutier	$18,934

=== WPT Championship ===
- Casino: Bellagio, Las Vegas
- Buy-in: $25,000
- 5-Day Event: April 14, 2003 to April 18, 2003
- Number of Entries: 111
- Total Prize Pool: $2,691,750
- Number of Payouts: 28
- Winning Hand: 8♥ 5♦

Final Table
Place	Name	Prize
1st	Alan Goehring	$1,011,886
2nd	Kirill Gerasimov	$506,625
3rd	Phil Ivey	$253,313
4th	Doyle Brunson	$159,987
5th	Ted Forrest	$119,990
6th	James Hoeppner	$93,326

== Other Events ==
During season 1 of the WPT there was one special event that did not apply to the Player of the Year standings:

- The WPT Invitational – February 25–26, 2003 – Commerce Casino – postscript to Event #8: L.A. Poker Classic
