= World Poker Tour season 6 results =

Sixth season

Below are the results of season six of the World Poker Tour (2007-2008).

Towards the end of season 6 the World Poker Tour announced that they would award a Tiffany designed titanium and diamond championship bracelet for all previous 96 players.

== Results ==
=== Mirage Poker Showdown ===
- Casino: The Mirage, Las Vegas
- Buy-in: $10,000
- 5-Day Event: May 19, 2007 to May 23, 2007
- Number of Entries: 309
- Total Prize Pool: $2,907,381
- Number of Payouts: 27
- Winning Hand: A♠ 2♠

Final Table
Place	Name	Prize
1st	Jonathan Little	$1,091,295
2nd	Cory Carroll	$561,369
3rd	Darrell Dicken	$259,369
4th	Richard Kirsch	$172,912
5th	Phil Ivey	$129,684
6th	Amnon Filippi	$100,865

=== Mandalay Bay Poker Championship ===
- Casino: Mandalay Bay, Las Vegas
- Buy-in: $10,000
- 5-Day Event: May 29, 2007 to June 2, 2007
- Number of Entries: 228
- Total Prize Pool: $2,211,600
- Number of Payouts: 27
- Winning Hand: 3♥ 3♦

Final Table
Place	Name	Prize
1st	Shawn Buchanan	$768,775
2nd	Jared Hamby	$459,080
3rd	David Levi	$229,540
4th	Thayer Rasmussen	$131,170
5th	David Haddad	$98,375
6th	Danny Wong	$76,515

=== Bellagio Cup III ===
- Casino: Bellagio, Las Vegas
- Buy-in: $10,000
- 6-Day Event: July 10, 2007 to July 15, 2007
- Number of Entries: 535
- Total Prize Pool: $5,189,500
- Number of Payouts: 100
- Winning Hand: Q♥ Q♠

Final Table
Place	Name	Prize
1st	Kevin Saul	$1,342,320
2nd	Mike Matusow	$671,320
3rd	Danny Wong	$361,480
4th	Shane Schleger	$232,490
5th	Eric Panayioyou	$154,920
6th	Konstantin Puchkov	$103,280

=== Legends of Poker ===
- Casino: Bicycle Casino, Los Angeles
- Buy-in: $10,000
- 6-Day Event: August 25, 2007 to August 30, 2007
- Number of Entries: 485
- Total Prize Pool: $4,607,500
- Number of Payouts: 45
- Winning Hand: 10♥ 5♣

Final Table
Place	Name	Prize
1st	Dan Harrington	$1,599,865
2nd	David Pham	$800,185
3rd	Thu Nguyen	$388,660
4th	Tom Schneider	$228,625
5th	Michael McClain	$182,900
6th	Shi Jia Liu	$137,175

=== Gulf Coast Poker Championship ===
- Casino: Beau Rivage, Biloxi
- Buy-in: $10,000
- 4-Day Event: September 6, 2007 to September 9, 2007
- Number of Entries: 256
- Total Prize Pool: $2,463,200
- Number of Payouts: 27
- Winning Hand: A♥ 9♠

Final Table
Place	Name	Prize
1st	Bill Edler	$747,615
2nd	David Robbins	$411,185
3rd	Hank Sitton	$216,768
4th	John Davidson	$163,540
5th	Tim Frazin	$140,177
6th	Tom Franklin	$120,814

=== Borgata Poker Open ===
- Casino: Borgata, Atlantic City
- Buy-in: $10,000
- 5-Day Event: September 16, 2007 to September 20, 2007
- Number of Entries: 560
- Total Prize Pool: $5,432,000
- Number of Payouts: 54
- Winning Hand: 4♥ 4♠

Final Table
Place	Name	Prize
1st	Roy Winston	$1,575,280
2nd	Heung Yoon	$832,725
3rd	Haralabos Voulgaris	$434,560
4th	Mark Weitzman	$380,240
5th	Eugene Todd	$325,920
6th	Mike Matusow	$271,280

=== Turks & Caicos Poker Classic ===
- Casino: Players Club, Turks and Caicos Islands
- Buy-in: $7,500
- 5-Day Event: September 26, 2007 to September 30, 2007
- Number of Entries: 137
- Total Prize Pool: $996,675
- Number of Payouts: 10
- Winning Hand: 10♥ 10♦

Final Table
Place	Name	Prize
1st	Rhynie Campbell	$436,675
2nd	Erik Cajelais	$225,000
3rd	Alan Sass	$125,000
4th	Chris Smith	$70,000
5th	Trevor Hebert	$50,000
6th	Nam Le	$30,000

=== Spanish Championship ===
- Casino: Casino Barcelona, Barcelona
- Buy-in: €7,500
- 5-Day Event: October 11, 2007 to October 16, 2007
- Number of Entries: 226
- Total Prize Pool: €1,665,500
- Number of Payouts: 27
- Winning Hand: K♥ 8♦

Final Table
Place	Name	Prize
1st	Markus Lehmann	€537,000 ($789,592)
2nd	Ludovic Lacay	€295,200 ($414,747)
3rd	Christer Johansson	€151,000 ($212,150)
4th	Steve Sung	€117,400 ($164,943)
5th	Gus Hansen	€100,600 ($141,340)
6th	Vladimir Poleshchuk	€83,900 ($117,877)

=== North American Poker Championship ===
- Casino: Fallsview Casino Resort, Niagara Falls, Ontario, Canada
- Buy-in: Can$10,000
- 8-Day Event: October 26, 2007 to November 2, 2007
- Number of Entries: 504
- Total Prize Pool: Can$5,133,335 (US$5,305,060)
- Number of Payouts: 45
- Winning Hand: Q♦ 5♦

Final Table
Place	Name	Prize
1st	Scott Clements	Can$1,456,585 (US$1,505,312)
2nd	Jonathan Little	Can$714,905 (US$738,821)
3rd	David Cloutier	Can$372,772 (US$385,242)
4th	Barry Greenstein	Can$306,388 (US$316,638)
5th	Kofi Farkye	Can$229,791 (US$237,478)
6th	Jeff Garza	Can$178,727 (US$184,706)

=== World Poker Finals ===
- Casino: Foxwoods, Mashantucket, Connecticut
- Buy-in: $10,000
- 7-Day Event: November 7, 2007 to November 13, 2007
- Number of Entries: 575
- Total Prize Pool: $5,404,075
- Number of Payouts: 50
- Winning Hand: A♦ Q♠

Final Table
Place	Name	Prize
1st	Mike Vela	$1,704,986
2nd	Nick Schulman	$864,652
3rd	Nenad Medic	$486,367
4th	Tom Dwan	$324,244
5th	Michael White	$243,184
6th	Mark Weitzman	$189,142

=== Doyle Brunson Classic Championship ===
- Casino: Bellagio, Las Vegas
- Buy-in: $15,000
- 7-Day Event: December 12, 2007 to December 18, 2007
- Number of Entries: 626
- Total Prize Pool: $9,390,000
- Number of Payouts: 100
- Winning Hand: J♥ 10♦

Final Table
Place	Name	Prize
1st	Eugene Katchalov	$2,482,605
2nd	Ted Kearly	$1,252,640
3rd	Dave Ulliott	$674,500
4th	Kenneth Rosen	$433,675
5th	Jordan Rich	$289,070
6th	Ryan Daut	$192,715

=== World Poker Open ===
- Casino: Gold Strike Tunica
- Buy-in: $10,000
- 5-Day Event: January 20, 2008 to January 24, 2008
- Number of Entries: 259
- Total Prize Pool: $2,512,300
- Number of Payouts: 27
- Winning Hand: Q♦ Q♠

Final Table
Place	Name	Prize
1st	Brett Faustman	$892,413
2nd	Hoyt Corkins	$458,267
3rd	Men Nguyen	$241,193
4th	Freddy Deeb	$168,835
5th	Gabe Costner	$123,008
6th	John Spadavecchia	$96,477

=== Borgata Winter Open ===
- Casino: Borgata, Atlantic City
- Buy-in: $10,000
- 5-Day Event: January 27, 2008 to January 31, 2008
- Number of Entries: 507
- Total Prize Pool: $4,917,900
- Number of Payouts: 54
- Winning Hand: Q♠ J♣

Final Table
Place	Name	Prize
1st	Gavin Griffin	$1,401,109
2nd	David Tran	$737,685
3rd	Thomas Hare	$381,137
4th	Noah Schwartz	$331,958
5th	Lee Watkinson	$282,779
6th	Ervin Prifti	$233,600

=== L.A. Poker Classic ===
- Casino: Commerce Casino, Los Angeles
- Buy-in: $10,000
- 6-Day Event: February 23, 2008 to February 28, 2008
- Number of Entries: 665
- Total Prize Pool: $6,288,000
- Number of Payouts: 63
- Winning Hand: A♥ 8♦

Final Table
Place	Name	Prize
1st	Phil Ivey	$1,596,100
2nd	Quinn Do	$909,400
3rd	Woody Moore	$625,630
4th	Nam Le	$411,770
5th	Scott Montgomery	$296,860
6th	Phil Hellmuth	$229,820

=== WPT Invitational ===
- Casino: Commerce Casino, Los Angeles
- Buy-in:
- 2-Day Event: March 1, 2008
- Number of Entries: 445
- Total Prize Pool: $225,500
- Number of Payouts: 6
- Winning Hand: K♦ 4♠

Final Table
Place	Name	Prize
1st	Van Nguyen	$125,500
2nd	Ethan Ruby	$50,000
3rd	Billy Baxter	$20,000
4th	Justin Marchand	$15,000
5th	Elias Madias	$10,000

- Van Nguyen became the first female to win a WPT title.

=== Bay 101 Shooting Star ===
- Casino: Bay 101, San Jose, California
- Buy-in: $10,000
- 5-Day Event: March 10, 2008 to March 14, 2008
- Number of Entries: 376
- Total Prize Pool: $3,336,000
- Number of Payouts: 45
- Winning Hand: 4♥ 4♠

Final Table
Place	Name	Prize
1st	Brandon Cantu	$1,000,000
2nd	Steve Sung	$585,000
3rd	Jennifer Harman	$330,000
4th	Noah Jefferson	$265,000
5th	Michael Baker	$200,000
6th	John Phan	$135,000

=== World Poker Challenge ===
- Casino: Reno Hilton, Reno
- Buy-in: $7,500
- 4-Day Event: March 25, 2008 to March 28, 2008
- Number of Entries: 261
- Total Prize Pool: $1,873,275
- Number of Payouts: 27
- Winning Hand: J♥ 4♦

Final Table
Place	Name	Prize
1st	Lee Markholt	$493,815
2nd	Bryan Devonshire	$271,625
3rd	Zachary Hyman	$149,862
4th	Jason Potter	$103,030
5th	David Pham	$93,664
6th	Jeff DeWitt	$84,297

=== Foxwoods Poker Classic ===
- Casino: Foxwoods, Mashantucket, Connecticut
- Buy-in: $10,000
- 6-Day Event: April 4, 2008 to April 9, 2008
- Number of Entries: 346
- Total Prize Pool: $3,230,014
- Number of Payouts: 40
- Winning Hand: A♥ J♦

Final Table
Place	Name	Prize
1st	Erik Seidel	$992,890
2nd	Robert Richardson	$558,792
3rd	Andrew Barta	$281,011
4th	Frank Cieri	$200,261
5th	Adam Katz	$151,811
6th	Ted Forrest	$103,360

=== WPT Championship ===
- Casino: Bellagio, Las Vegas
- Buy-in: $25,000
- 7-Day Event: April 19, 2008 to April 26, 2008
- Number of Entries: 545
- Total Prize Pool: $13,216,250
- Number of Payouts: 100
- Winning Hand: A♠ 9♠

Final Table
Place	Name	Prize
1st	David Chiu	$3,389,140
2nd	Gus Hansen	$1,714,800
3rd	John Roveto	$923,355
4th	Cory Carroll	$593,645
5th	Tommy Le	$395,725
6th	Jeff King	$263,815

== Other Events ==
During season 6 of the WPT there was one special event that did not apply to the Player of the Year standings:

- The WPT Celebrity Invitational - March 1–3, 2008 - Commerce Casino - postscript to Event #14: L.A. Poker Classic
