= Professional Poker Tour =

Series of televised poker tournaments

The Professional Poker Tour (PPT) was a series of televised poker tournaments, spinning off from the World Poker Tour (WPT) television series. It billed itself as the first professional poker league, and was limited to players who have established themselves on the World Poker Tour, World Series of Poker, or major participation on the poker circuit.

Matt Corboy was the lead commentator, with poker pro Mark Seif as color commentator and Kaye Han as floor reporter. The first season, taped in 2004-2005, began airing regularly on Travel Channel on July 5, 2006 and left the air in 2007.

== Television format ==
Events were telecast across five shows each. The first four shows were labeled as quarters, from 1st Quarter to 4th Quarter, reflecting early-round play in the event. The final six-player table was the fifth show of the cycle.

== Qualifying ==
These tournaments were invitation-only freerolls (no entry fee, but only certain players were invited).

=== First season qualifiers ===
- All WPT winners
- Any player that made more than one WPT final table in a single season
- Top three places in WPT Championship
- Top ten places on WPT Season 2 Player of the Year list
- All previous winners of the World Series of Poker (WSOP) Main Event
- Top three places in 2003 and 2004 WSOP Main Event
- Top ten places on CardPlayer Player of the Year list
- Top ten places on Phil Hellmuth Jr Champion of the Year list
- Members of the World Poker Tour Walk of Fame
- Members of the Poker Hall of Fame
- Fourth, fifth and sixth place finish in WPT Championship
- Fourth, fifth and sixth place finish in WSOP Main Event during 2003 or 2004
- Players selected by the PPT Advisory Committee
- Top ten places on Poker Europa List for 2004
- WPT commentators

== Second season ==
The PPT was canceled after one season. Events that comprised the PPT in 2005 were integrated into the WPT schedule in 2007-08.

== Results ==
Event	Winner	Prize	Other Finalists
World Poker Finals	John Juanda	$225,000	Chris Bigler; Ron Rose; Dan Harrington; Jennifer Harman; Casey Kastle
LA Poker Classic	Erick Lindgren	$225,000	Chris Bigler; Daniel Negreanu; Dennis Waterman; Asher Derei; Allen Krell
Bay 101	Tom McEvoy	$225,000	Marsha Waggoner; Alfredo "Toto" Leonidas; Casey Kastle; Paul Magriel; Hoyt Corkins
3rd Annual Five Star World Poker Classic	Lee Markholt	$225,000	Barry Shulman; Doyle Brunson; Chris Bjorin; Dan Heimiller; Erick Lindgren
Mirage Poker Showdown	Ted Forrest	$225,000	Randy Jensen; David Levi; Tom Franklin; Chris Tsiprailidis; Blair Rodman
