= Thomas Chung =

Thomas Chung may refer to:

- Thomas Chung (poker player), American poker player
- Thomas Chung (artist) (born 1988), American artist
