= Chris Tsiprailidis =

American poker player

- Nickname: Syracuse Chris
- Born: 12 April; Greece

World Series of Poker
- Bracelet: 1
- Money finishes: 27
- Highest WSOP Main Event finish: None

World Poker Tour
- Title: None
- Final table: 1
- Money finishes: 5

Christos "Chris" Tsiprailidis (born 12 April in Greece), nicknamed Syracuse Chris, is an American professional poker player based in Syracuse, New York.

Before turning to poker as his career, Tsiprailidis he was a soccer player and worked as a chef.

Tsiprailidis has been cashing at the World Series of Poker (WSOP) since the early 1990s. He finished runner-up to Phil Hellmuth Jr in the $1,500 no limit Texas hold 'em event in 1993, and went on to win a WSOP bracelet in 2000 in the $3,000 limit hold 'em event.

Tsiprailidis has also made final tables on the World Poker Tour (WPT), Professional Poker Tour (PPT), and Ultimate Poker Challenge.

As of 2009, his total live tournament winnings exceed $2,450,000. His 27 cashes as the WSOP account for $501,492 of those winnings.
