= 1989 World Series of Poker =

Series of poker tournaments

- Location: Binion's Horseshoe, Las Vegas, Nevada
- Dates: May 1 – 19

Champion
- (United States) Phil Hellmuth

The 1989 World Series of Poker (WSOP) was a series of poker tournaments held at Binion's Horseshoe. The 1989 Main Event was won by 24-year-old Phil Hellmuth, defeating defending champion Johnny Chan, and also breaking the record for being the youngest player to win the WSOP Main Event (a record previously set by Stu Ungar in 1980). Had Chan won, he would have tied Johnny Moss's record of three Main Event wins. This year also marked the first year in which Moss did not finish any WSOP tournaments inside the payout positions.

== Events ==
There were 13 preliminary events at the 1989 World Series of Poker. All 14 bracelet winners in the 1989 WSOP were first-time winners.

#	Date	Event	Entries	Winner	Prize	Runner-up	Results
1	May 1, 1989	$1,500 Limit Omaha	181	Lyle Berman (1/1)	$108,600	MacDonald Kempe	Results
2	May 2, 1989	$1,500 Pot Limit Omaha	180	Barry Blackburn (1/1)	$108,000	T. J. Cloutier (0/1)	Results
3	May 3, 1989	$1,000 Limit Hold'em	449	George Allen Shaw (1/1)	$179,600	Lee Southard	Results
4	May 4, 1989	$2,500 Pot Limit Omaha	99	Frank Henderson (1/1)	$184,000	Kevin Redican	Results
5	May 5, 1989	$5,000 Seven Card Stud	77	Don Holt (1/1)	$154,000	David Sklansky (0/3)	Results
6	May 6, 1989	$1,500 Seven Card Stud	218	Mel Judah (1/1)	$130,800	Jerry Buhr	Results
7	May 7, 1989	$2,000 No Limit Hold'em	305	Norman Keyser (1/1)	$244,000	Tommy Grimes	Results
8	May 8, 1989	$1,500 Seven Card Razz	159	John Laudon (1/1)	$95,400	Said Barjesteh	Results
9	May 9, 1989	$1,500 Ace to Five Draw	199	Harry Madoff (1/1)	$119,400	Billy Baxter (0/5)	Results
10	May 10, 1989	$500 Ladies' Seven Card Stud	93	Alma McClelland (1/1)	$18,600	Adrienne Zoia	Results
11	May 11, 1989	$1,500 Seven Card Stud Split	174	Mike Sexton (1/1)	$104,400	Sid Herald	Results
12	May 12, 1989	$2,000 Limit Hold'em	265	Thomas Chung (1/1)	$212,000	Carl McKelvey	Results
13	May 13, 1989	$5,000 Deuce to Seven Draw	34	Bob Stupak (1/1)	$139,500	Billy Baxter (0/5)	Results
14	May 14, 1989	$10,000 No Limit Hold'em Main Event	178	Phil Hellmuth (1/1)	$755,000	Johnny Chan (0/3)	Results

== Main Event ==
There were 178 entrants to the main event. Each paid $10,000 to enter the tournament, with the top 36 players finishing in the money. Johnny Chan was denied a third consecutive Main Event crown when he was defeated heads-up by Phil Hellmuth. Noel Furlong finished in sixth place. He would later go on to win the 1999 World Series of Poker Main Event.

=== Final table ===
Place	Name	Prize
1st	Phil Hellmuth	$755,000
2nd	Johnny Chan	$302,000
3rd	Don Zewin	$151,000
4th	Steve Lott	$83,050
5th	Lyle Berman	$67,950
6th	Noel Furlong	$52,850

=== In The Money Finishes ===
NB: This list is restricted to In The Money finishers with an existing Wikipedia entry.

Place	Name	Prize
11th	John Esposito	$12,500
14th	Jay Heimowitz	$12,500
16th	John Bonetti	$12,500
22nd	Mickey Appleman	$10,000
23rd	Chip Reese	$10,000
24th	An Tran	$10,000
25th	Hilbert Shirey	$10,000
28th	Yoshio Nakano	$7,500
29th	Berry Johnston	$7,500
31st	Jim Bechtel	$7,500
35th	Puggy Pearson	$7,500
36th	Crandell Addington	$7,500
