= Steve Badger =

Steve or Stephen Badger may refer to:

- Steve Badger (poker player), former professional poker player
- Steve Badger (swimmer) (born 1956), Australian and later Canadian former swimmer
- Stephen M. Badger (born 1968), American heir, businessman and documentary producer
