= Jonathan Little =

American poker player (born 1984)

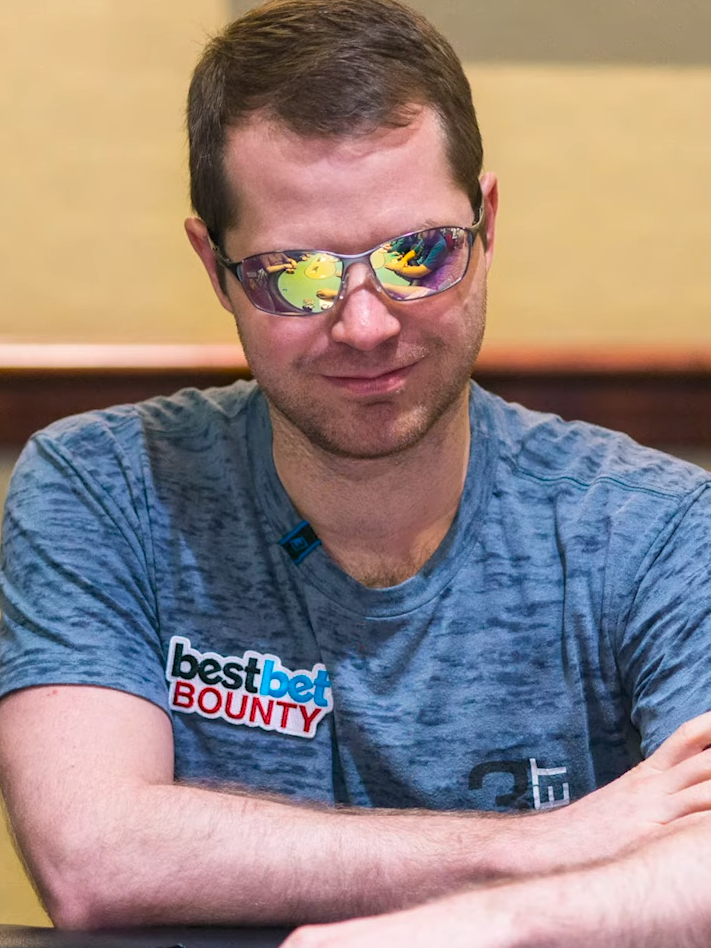
- Little in 2019
- Nicknames: Fiery Justice; Jcardshark
- Born: December 22, 1984 (age 41); Pensacola, Florida, U.S

World Series of Poker
- Bracelet: 1
- Final tables: 7
- Money finishes: 60
- Highest WSOP Main Event finish: 316th, 2024

World Poker Tour
- Titles: 2
- Final tables: 5
- Money finishes: 28

European Poker Tour
- Title: 1
- Final tables: 5
- Money finishes: 13

Jonathan Little (born December 22, 1984) is an American professional poker player who won the World Poker Tour's Season VI Mirage Poker Showdown, the Season VII Foxwoods World Poker Finals, the WPT Season VI Player of the Year award, and the 2024 PokerGo Cup, and the 2019 GPI Poker Personality of the Year award.

== Biography ==
Little was born on December 22, 1984 in Pensacola, Florida. He was a student at the University of West Florida studying psychology when he began playing poker with friends. As his interest in poker grew, it led him to study many books on poker. After earning an initial bankroll of $350,000 online over a six-month period, he decided to drop out of college and play poker professionally.

== Poker ==
Little is a successful professional poker player who has played online under the screen names "FieryJustice", "Jcardshark", and "JonLittle".

Little frequently posts educational training content on his Youtube channel which has over 240,000 subscribers, and also at his personal site, JonathanLittlePoker.com.

Little was a participant in the now defunct online poker training sites called SNGIcons.com and FloatTheTurn.com. Little has since created his own poker training website, PokerCoaching.com.

== World Championship of Online Poker ==
At the 2008 World Championship of Online Poker, playing under his PokerStars screen name "Jcardshark", Little finished 7th place in the $10,300 buy-in (event #5), earning $107,535 at a final table consisting of other well known players like Major League Baseball Pitcher Orel Hershiser (O. Hershiser), 2003 World Series of Poker Main Event Champion Chris Moneymaker (Money800) online pros Nick Niergarth (gbmantis), Greg Hobson (DuckU), Scott Dorin (dorinvandy) who won the event and the European Poker Tour Season IV Grand Final Champion Glen Chorny (Choron). This win brings Little's total online cashes on Pokerstars to over $280,000.

== World Poker Tour ==
Little finished fifth in the World Poker Tour (WPT) PokerStars.com Caribbean Poker Adventure Championship winning $317,873 and went to win the WPT Mirage Poker Showdown title, earning $1,066,295. The final table was made of four other professional poker players, Cory Carroll who finished runner-up, Darrell Dicken (3rd), Phil Ivey (5th), and Amnon Filippi (6th). In November 2007 he finished runner-up to Scott Clements in the WPT North American Poker Championship, where he earned an additional $738,821. Little won the WPT Season VI Player of the Year.

In November 2008, Little won the WPT Foxwoods World Poker Finals for his second WPT title after defeating professional poker player Jonathan Jaffe during heads-up play. The final table included professional poker players Mike Matusow who finished 6th and David Pham who finished 4th. The match broke the record for longest WPT final table at 275 hands and longest WPT heads-up match with 170 hands.

== World Series of Poker ==
As of 2025, Little has cashed 60 times at the World Series of Poker (WSOP). In 2010, he cashed 5 times, including a 3rd-place finish in Event # 53, the Limit Hold'em Shootout for $73,218. In 2013, he cashed 5 times, including a 3rd-place finish in Event # 32, the No-Limit Hold 'Em/Six Handed $5,000 buy-in for $238,833, as well as twice at the WSOPE. In 2015, he cashed 4 times, including a 6th-place finish in Event # 25, Eight-Handed $5,000 buy-in for $85,616. In 2016 he cashed in 5 events for $63,231 - including a tag team event with his mother and father as partners. He won his first WSOP bracelet in a 2025 online event ($1,000 No Limit Hold'em - Freezeout). In 2025, Little won the $1,000 online WSOP bracelet event #9 for $90,663, and also took two seconds that year.

His lifetime winnings at the WSOP exceed $950,000 as of 2025.

As of 2025, his total live tournament winnings exceed $9,300,000.

== Bibliography ==
- Secrets of Professional Tournament Poker, Volume 1: Fundamentals and How to Handle Varying Stack Sizes (2011) ISBN 978-1904468561
- Secrets of Professional Tournament Poker, Volume 2: Stages of the Tournament (2012) ISBN 978-1904468585
- Secrets of Professional Tournament Poker, Volume 3: The Complete Workout (2013) ISBN 978-1904468950
- Positive Poker: A Modern Psychological Approach to Mastering Your Mental Game (2013)
- The Main Event with Jonathan Little: In-Depth Analysis of 54 Poker Hands from my WSOP Main Event (2014) ISBN 978-1500766375
- Jonathan Little on Live No-Limit Cash Games, Volume 1: The Theory (2014) ISBN 978-1909457232
- Jonathan Little on Live No-Limit Cash Games, Volume 2: The Practice (2015) ISBN 978-1904468950
- Strategies for Beating Small Stakes Poker Tournaments (2015) ISBN 978-1508660200
- Jonathan Little's Excelling at No-Limit Hold'em: Leading poker experts discuss how to study, play and master NLHE (2015) ISBN 978-1909457447
- Strategies for Beating Small Stakes Poker Cash Games (2015) ISBN 978-1518655388
- Peak Poker Performance: How to bring your 'A' game to every session (2016) ISBN 978-1-909457-50-8
- Bluffs: How to Intelligently Apply Aggression to Increase Your Profits from Poker (2016) ISBN 978-1537130231
