= Kirill Gerasimov =

Russian poker player (born 1971)

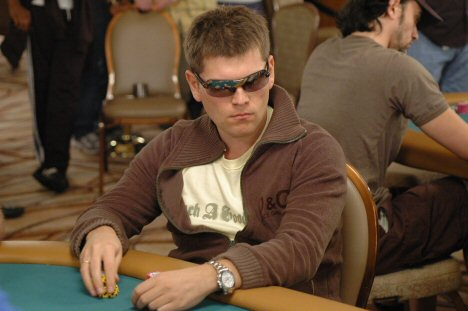
- Gerasimov at the 2005 World Series of Poker.
- Born: 5 June 1971 (age 55)

World Series of Poker
- Bracelet: None
- Money finishes: 28
- Highest WSOP Main Event finish: 439th, 2008

World Poker Tour
- Title: None
- Final table: 1
- Money finishes: 3

European Poker Tour
- Title: None
- Final tables: 2
- Money finishes: 2

Kirill Gerasimov (Russian: Кирилл Герасимов, born 5 June 1971, in Moscow, Soviet Union) is a Russian professional poker player.

== Personal life ==
Gerasimov was mentored in poker by professional Marcel Lüske. Gerasimov himself went on to mentor former tennis professional Yevgeny Kafelnikov in poker as well as fellow professional Mikhail Lakhitov.

== Poker career ==
=== World Poker Tour ===
The Paradise Poker website backed Gerasimov in the World Poker Tour season 1 $25,000 championship event, where he finished runner-up to Alan Goehring to take home a $506,625 prize.

=== World Heads-Up Poker Championship ===
In June 2002, he won the second World Heads-Up Poker Championship in Vienna, winning the €60,000 grand prize.

=== World Series of Poker ===
In May 2003, Gerasimov made his first World Series of Poker - WSOP final table, finishing in 6th place in the $1,500 No Limit Hold-Em event and receiving a $24,000 prize. Other finalists in the tournament included eventual winner Amir Vahedi and other professionals T. J. Cloutier, and Brad Daugherty.

In April 2004, Gerasimov returned to the WSOP and again made two final tables: a 5th-place finish ($30,060) in the $1,500 Pot Limit Hold-Em event featuring 1996 Main Event champion Huck Seed and Tony Bloom, and a 2nd-place finish ($100,000) in the $1,500 No Limit Hold-Em shootout event featuring John Juanda and Daniel Negreanu.

Gerasimov cashed four times in the 2005 World Series of Poker, including a 2nd-place finish ($108,775) in the seven-card stud tournament, and he cashed in the $10,000 Main Event World Championship for the first time, with his 444th-place finish earning $16,055.

At the 2008 World Series of Poker, Gerasimov made two final tables, 5th in the $5,000 Pot-Limit Omaha w/ Rebuys, earning $192,870 won by Phil Galfond and 6th in the $2,000 No Limit Hold'em event, earning $177,111 and he slightly bested his 2005 Main Event run (444th place) when he finished in 439th place out of 6,844 entries, earning $27,020.

At the 2009 World Series of Poker, Gerasimov finished runner-up in the $10,000 Pot Limit Hold'em World Championship for $391,369, his largest WSOP cash to date.

=== European Poker Tour ===
Gerasimov made two final tables during the second season of the European Poker Tour (EPT), finishing in 5th-place in London and 3rd-place in Deauville.

=== Poker earnings ===
Gerasimov's live tournament winnings exceed $2,500,000 with his last major cash coming in 2018. His 29 cashes at the WSOP account for $1,377,938 of those winnings.
