= Michael Gracz =

Polish poker player (born 1980)

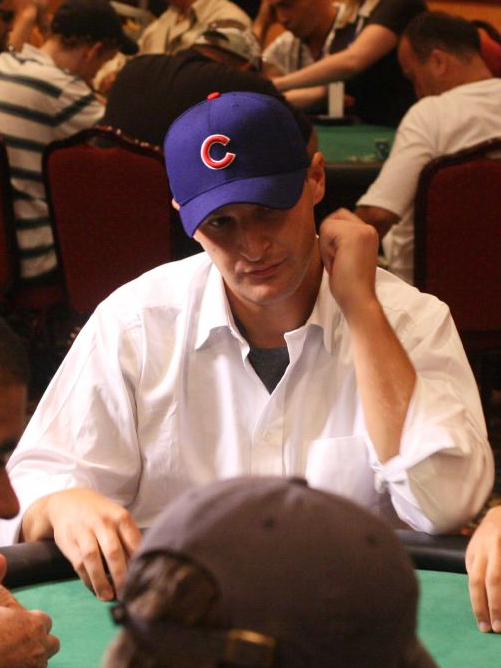
- Gracz at the 2007 Aruba Poker Classic
- Born: Maciek Gracz; October 23, 1980 (age 46); Warsaw, Poland

World Series of Poker
- Bracelet: 1
- Money finishes: 7
- Highest WSOP Main Event finish: None

World Poker Tour
- Title: 1
- Final table: 1
- Money finishes: 5

Maciek ("Michael" or "Mike") Gracz (pronounced Grahtz) (born 23 October 1980, in Warsaw) is a Polish professional poker player, based in Raleigh, North Carolina.

Gracz learned poker from his father and played regularly whilst studying at North Carolina State University.

Gracz's first major victory was in the $5,000 no limit hold'em championship event in the 2004 Trump Classic in Atlantic City. He won over the field of 155 entrants to take home the $295,275 first prize.

On 19 March 2005, he won the World Poker Tour (WPT) PartyPoker.com Million IV Cruise event (the largest limit hold'em tournament in history) and the $1,500,000 first prize, defeating a final table that included Paul Darden.

Three months later, he won his first World Series of Poker bracelet in the $1,000 no limit hold'em w/ rebuys event, scooping the first prize of $594,460.

In April 2008, Gracz finished 11th in the WPT Championship Event at the Bellagio Cup IV, earning approximately $130,000.

As of 2019, his total live tournament winnings exceed $3,100,000. His 15 cashes at the WSOP account for $833,968 of those winnings.

Gracz has served as a frequent commentator for the Fox Sports Net poker tournament program Poker Dome Challenge.

== World Series of Poker bracelets ==
Year	Tournament	Prize (US$)
2005	$1,000 No Limit Hold'em w/ rebuys	$594,460
