= Noel Furlong =

Irish businessman and poker player (1937–2021)

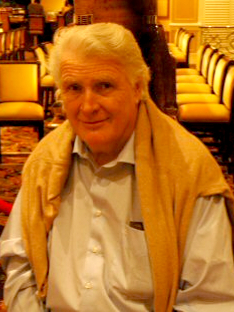
- Furlong in the World Poker Tour Five Diamond World Poker Classic event
- Nickname: Noel
- Born: John James Furlong; 25 December 1937; Dublin, Ireland
- Died: 27 June 2021 (aged 83)

World Series of Poker
- Bracelet: 1
- Money finishes: 3
- Highest WSOP Main Event finish: Winner, 1999

John James Furlong (25 December 1937 – 27 June 2021) was an Irish businessman and poker player who won the 1999 World Series of Poker main event.

== Early life ==
Furlong was born and raised in Dublin, Ireland. He originally became a millionaire from his carpet manufacturing business, Furlong Flooring.

Although christened John James Furlong, he was nicknamed "Noel" because he was born on Christmas Day.

== Poker ==
Furlong began playing poker in 1984, and in his first trip to the World Series of Poker (WSOP) in 1989, he placed 6th in the Main Event. That final table was won by Phil Hellmuth, and also included two time world champion, Johnny Chan, and business executive and professional poker player, Lyle Berman.

According to Furlong in 1989, his mentor was Terry Rogers. Furlong stated, "He was my mentor at cards. He got me to take up the game originally." He added, "I would not have gone to Las Vegas this year to play in the World Poker Championships if not for him. He rang me two days before the event started and said, `I have two firstclass tickets to Vegas.' He persuaded me to go." (Note: Terry Rogers (1928, Dun Laoghaire - 1999, Gran Canaria) was known as the "father of Irish modern book-making" according to Stuart Kenny of Paddy Power Bookmakers. In 1973, Terry Rogers received £250,000 and 100,000 Ladbrokes shares when he sold his stake in a 53-shop chain of English betting shops to Ladbrokes. In the 1970s, Rogers lost large amounts after the insolvency of International Overseas Services, which was an investment bank registered in the Caribbean.)

Ten years later, Furlong's biggest win came in the 1999 WSOP main event, in which he won $1 million. He defeated a final table that included professional poker players, Padraig Parkinson, Erik Seidel, Chris Bigler, 1996 WSOP Main Event Champion Huck Seed, and Alan Goehring, whom Furlong defeated in heads-up play to win the title. He was the second-oldest winner of the Main Event at the time of his victory, trailing only Johnny Moss.

Until Andy Black's 5th-place finish at the 2005 World Series of Poker main event, he was the top money-winning Irish poker player in the world. He is ranked on the Irish poker tournament money-winning list.

Furlong also won the Irish Poker Open, the longest running tournament in Europe (and now one of the largest), in 1987 and again in 1989. Furlong is one of only five players in Irish Poker Open history to have won the tournament twice.

In his later years, he did not travel much to play poker, preferring to concentrate on his business and other interests while playing occasionally in tournaments in Ireland and the United Kingdom.

As of 2009, Furlong's total live tournament winnings exceed $1,100,000. His 3 cashes at the WSOP account for $1,070,785 of those winnings.

=== World Series of Poker Bracelets ===
Year	Tournament	Prize (US$)
1999	$10,000 No Limit Hold'em World Championship	$1,000,000

== Business and other interests ==
Furlong owned a carpet distribution company that does over $100 million worth of business a year. Because of his involvement with the carpet business, he didn't play poker frequently, usually only the WSOP and tournaments in Ireland and western Europe.

Furlong's other interests included owning horses and working as a horse trainer. In March 1991 he won £1.5m from bookmakers when his horse Destriero won the Supreme Novices' Hurdle at Cheltenham.

== Death ==
Furlong died on 27 June 2021 from natural causes, aged 83.
