= Don Zewin =

American poker player (1952–2021)

- Born: September 26, 1952; Niagara Falls, New York
- Died: October 31, 2021 (aged 69); Las Vegas, Nevada

World Series of Poker
- Bracelet: None
- Final tables: 10
- Money finishes: 38
- Highest WSOP Main Event finish: 3rd, 1989

World Poker Tour
- Title: None
- Final table: 1
- Money finishes: 3

Don Zewin (September 26, 1952 - October 31, 2021) was a poker player most known for finishing third in the 1989 World Series of Poker Main Event ($151,000). Although no bracelet event wins Zewin has 7 six-figure cashes, including a runner-up (to Phil Hellmuth) in the $2,500 Seven Card Razz (Event #18) at the 2012 World Series of Poker, in a career spanning from the eighties to his death in 2021.

== Birth ==
Zewin was born to Eddie and Sally Zewin in Niagara Falls, New York.

== Early profession ==
Zewin ran his family's furniture store before moving to Las Vegas in 1979 to play professional poker.

== H.O.R.S.E Championship ==
Among Zewin's best accomplishments includes two third-place finishings in the $10,000 World Championship in H.O.R.S.E for $210,629 (2015) and $163,557 (2017), respectively.

== World Poker Tour ==
Zewin's best results on the World Poker Tour includes a fourth place finish in the WPT North American Championship for $189,630 (2005) and an outright win in a WPT side event in 2003 netting $118,146.

== Death ==
In 2021 Zewin died at the age of 69 due to complications arising from Non-Hodgkin's lymphoma.

== Career earnings ==
Zewin's total live tournament winnings exceeds $1,800,000.
