= Chris Karagulleyan =

American/Lebanese poker player (born 1968)

- Nickname: None

World Series of Poker
- Bracelet: None
- Money finish: 1
- Highest WSOP Main Event finish: None

World Poker Tour
- Title: 1
- Final tables: 2(+1)
- Money finishes: 3(+1)

Chris Karagulleyan (born 1968 in Beirut, Lebanon) is a professional gambler now living in Glendale, California, United States. Before becoming a gambler, he worked as a taxi driver and as a baker.

== Biography ==
Karagulleyan broke onto the poker scene by winning the World Poker Tour $5,000 No Limit Hold-Em tournament at the 2002 Legends of Poker, to earn a $258,000 first prize. Several finishes continued on from this, including winning the $62,700 first prize in the $1,500 Pot Limit Hold-Em tournament at the 2003 LA Poker Classic. However, Karagulleyan took all the winnings and bet it at a blackjack table, losing all his winnings from the event.

Karagulleyan won both his first pot and last pot at the 2002 Legends of Poker World Poker Tour final table while holding pocket Queens. Knocking out both Kathy Liebert and later on, Hon Le to win the tournament.

Karagulleyan eliminated Liebert from the final table of the 2002 Legends of Poker World Poker Tour tournament on only the second hand. Liebert raised to $20,000 with A♠ K♥, Karagulleyan re-raised to $60,000 while holding Q♠ Q♥. It came back around to Kathy, who moved all in for her remaining $129,000, which Chris also called. The board read 5♠ 6♦ 5♣ 6♣ 7♣. This gave Karagulleyan two pair, Queens and sixes, and the best hand. It was considered the fastest elimination on the World Poker Tour. Tied only by T. J. Cloutier later that same season at the Reno Hilton's World Poker Challenge, when his pocket sevens were defeated by Ron Rose's pocket Aces. This was on only the second hand of the final table. Michael Perry was knocked out on the very first hand of play at the final table of the season five World Poker Finals.

Karagulleyan's largest cash came in the 2009 WPT L.A. Poker Classic Main Event, finishing 4th for $430,963.

As of 2023, Karagulleyan's total live tournament winnings exceed $1,700,000.
