= 1993 World Series of Poker =

Series of poker tournaments

- Location: Binion's Horseshoe, Las Vegas, Nevada
- Dates: April 20 – May 10

Champion
- (United States) Jim Bechtel

The 1993 World Series of Poker (WSOP) was a series of poker tournaments held at Binion's Horseshoe.

== Events ==
There were 20 preliminary events at the 1993 World Series of Poker. Phil Hellmuth and Ted Forrest both won three bracelets during the 1993 WSOP, tying a record for a single World Series originally set by Puggy Pearson in the 1973 WSOP. Hellmuth narrowly missed a fourth bracelet in the final event, losing to future Hall of Famer Billy Baxter.

#	Date	Event	Entries	Winner	Prize	Runner-up	Results
1	April 20, 1993	$1,500 Seven Card Stud	173	Robert Turner (1/1)	$103,800	Dave Crunkleton	Results
2	April 21, 1993	$2,500 Seven Card Stud	113	Marty Sigel (1/1)	$113,000	Lonnie Williams	Results
3	April 22, 1993	$2,500 Omaha Hi-Lo Split	94	Erik Seidel (1/2)	$94,000	J. W. Smith	Results
4	April 23, 1993	$1,500 Limit Hold'em	383	Hugo Mieth (1/1)	$220,800	Jack Keller (0/2)	Results
5	April 24, 1993	$1,500 Limit Omaha	103	Jack Keller (1/3)	$61,800	Howard Lederer	Results
6	April 25, 1993	$1,000 Ladies' Seven Card Stud	82	Phyllis Kessler (1/1)	$32,800	Becki Vincent	Results
7	April 26, 1993	$2,500 No Limit Hold'em	173	Phil Hellmuth (1/3)	$173,000	Noli Francisco	Results
8	April 27, 1993	$1,500 No Limit Hold'em	284	Phil Hellmuth (2/4)	$161,400	Chris Tsiprailidis	Results
9	April 28, 1993	$5,000 Limit Hold'em	63	Phil Hellmuth (3/5)	$138,000	Don Williams (0/3)	Results
10	April 29, 1993	$1,500 Ace to Five Draw	138	Chau Giang (1/1)	$82,800	Brian Nadell	Results
11	April 30, 1993	$5,000 Seven Card Stud	57	Ted Forrest (1/1)	$114,000	John Heaney	Results
12	May 1, 1993	$1,500 Razz	129	Ted Forrest (2/2)	$77,400	Charles Burris	Results
13	May 2, 1993	$1,500 Omaha Hi-Lo Split	200	Ted Forrest (3/3)	$120,000	John Cernuto	Results
14	May 3, 1993	$1,500 Seven Card Stud Hi-Lo Split	189	Gene Fisher (1/2)	$113,400	Mike Krescanko	Results
15	May 4, 1993	$2,500 Pot Limit Hold'em	114	Hamid Dastmalchi (1/3)	$114,000	Mickey Appleman (0/2)	Results
16	May 5, 1993	$2,500 Pot Limit Omaha	128	Humberto Brenes (1/1)	$128,000	Jay Heimowitz (0/3)	Results
17	May 6, 1993	$2,500 Limit Hold'em	149	Humberto Brenes (2/2)	$149,000	Tom Cady	Results
18	May 7, 1993	$1,500 Pot Limit Omaha	139	Buddy Bonnecaze (1/2)	$83,400	Roy Dudley	Results
19	May 8, 1993	$1,500 Pot Limit Hold'em	204	John Bonetti (1/2)	$122,400	Chau Giang (0/1)	Results
20	May 9, 1993	$5,000 No Limit Deuce to Seven Draw	58	Billy Baxter (1/6)	$130,500	Phil Hellmuth (3/5)	Results
21	May 10, 1993	$10,000 No Limit Hold'em Main Event	231	Jim Bechtel	$1,000,000	Glenn Cozen	Results

== Main Event ==
There were 231 entrants to the main event. Each paid $10,000 to enter the tournament, with the top 27 players finishing in the money. The first two female players to finish in the money in the main event were Marsha Waggoner, who finished in 19th place, and Wendeen H. Eolis, who finished in 20th place. 1990 Main Event winner Mansour Matloubi entered the final table in pursuit of a second Main Event title, but finished in fourth place.

=== Final table ===
Place	Name	Prize
1st	Jim Bechtel	$1,000,000
2nd	Glenn Cozen	$420,000
3rd	John Bonetti	$210,000
4th	Mansour Matloubi	$120,000
5th	Thomas Chung	$72,000
6th	Mick Cowley	$36,000

=== In The Money Finishes ===
NB: This list is restricted to In The Money finishers with an existing Wikipedia entry.

Place	Name	Prize
9th	Brad Daugherty	$24,000
12th	Henry Orenstein	$19,200
13th	Robert Turner	$16,880
15th	Mori Eskandani	$16,800
19th	Marsha Waggoner	$12,000
20th	Wendeen Eolis	$12,000
24th	Mike Sexton	$12,000
25th	Bobby Hoff	$12,000
26th	Chip Reese	$12,000
