= Phyllis Kessler =

American poker player (1936–2008)

- Born: January 6, 1936
- Died: April 22, 2008 (aged 72); Las Vegas, Nevada, U.S.

World Series of Poker
- Bracelet: 1
- Money finishes: 6
- Highest WSOP Main Event finish: None

Phyllis Kessler (January 6, 1936 – April 22, 2008) was a World Series of Poker champion in the 1993 $1,000 Ladies - Limit 7 Card Stud event. In addition, she played bridge for the Israeli National Team.

Kessler's live tournament winnings was $96,195.

Kessler died on April 22, 2008, at the age of 72.

== World Series of Poker bracelets ==
Year	Tournament	Prize (US$)
1993	$1,000 Ladies - Limit 7 Card Stud	$32,800
