= Poker Dome Challenge =

- Gameplay in the Poker Dome
- Also known as: MANSIONPoker.net Poker Dome Challenge
- Country of origin: United States
- No. of seasons: 1
- No. of episodes: 43

Production
- Running time: 2 hours

Original release
- Network: Fox Sports Net

The MANSIONPoker.net Poker Dome Challenge was a 43-week series of speed poker tournaments offering a grand prize of US$1,000,000. The tournament aired in the United States on Fox Sports Network from May 2006 to March 2007. The tournament featured a number of technological gimmicks in an effort to increase viewer interest and excitement. Commentating duties were shared by rotating hosts including Barry Tompkins, Jon Kelley, Michael Konik, Michael Gracz, Joel Meyers and Chris Rose with Leeann Tweeden serving as co-host/exit interviewer (occasionally covered by Nafeesa DeFlorias). Matt Savage was the tournament director.

The series consisted of single table tournaments of six players each. Five of the six competitors qualified through daily freeroll tournaments held at mansionpoker.net. Another competitor came from the National Pub Poker League, an amateur poker league that partnered with MansionPoker.net and qualified its nightly bar tournament winners into a private weekly freeroll. Winners of the online qualifiers were flown all expenses paid to Las Vegas, Nevada and received $500 in casino chips and other amenities.

Professional poker players Tony G, Dennis Waterman and Perry Friedman and reality television personality-turned poker pro Rob Mariano have appeared in the Dome. Nevada casino author Al W Moe appeared in the Dome and his wife, Shannon R Moe, was an alternate selection a month later.

Players started with 50,000 in tournament chips and play continued until one player had all 300,000. The tournament was single-elimination and only the winner of each table received prize money. Players had just 15 seconds to act on a hand before it was ruled dead. Each player was given one 30-second time extension that could be used at any time. When the table got to heads-up, each player received another 30-second time extension (although if a player hadn't previously used the extension he or she did not then have two). Betting was pot-limit pre-flop and no-limit post-flop until heads-up play, when it became all no-limit.

Each preliminary winner pocketed $25,000 in cash and advanced to the semi-finals. After each set of six preliminary tournaments, a semi-final single table tournament was played among the six winners, with the winner of that table taking $50,000 and advancing to the final table. After the six semi-final matches were played, the finalists played one more single table tournament for the $1,000,000 winner-take-all grand prize. Each of the other finalists won a prize package from Mansion Poker worth $13,000.

== The Poker Dome ==
Tournaments were played in front of a live audience in a structure called The Poker Dome. The audience couldn't be seen or heard by the players and players were screened before entering the Dome to ensure they were unable to communicate with anyone outside the Dome. The high tech table featured an LED display for the dealer button, hole card cameras, automatic card reading technology (described on-screen as "computer chips," possibly passive RFID tags) and built in LED hand timers. Two dealers worked the tournaments to maintain the fast pace, and players were attached to heart monitors. Players' hole cards and heart rates were displayed for the live audience and in particularly stressful situations like all in bets, heart rates were displayed to the home audience.

The Tropicana Resort & Casino hosted the first eight Round 1 preliminaries and the first Round 2 playoff prior to the completion of construction at the Neonopolis, where a top-floor movie theatre was reworked into the Poker Dome set. Eventual Poker Dome Challenge winner Rodel Tuazon won the first preliminary held in the Neonopolis studio, in an episode also featuring Tony G.

== Tournament results ==
Round	Winner	Hometown	Round	Winner	Hometown
Preliminary 1	Rhowena Colclough	Birmingham, UK	Preliminary 7	Reg Brittain	Northampton, MA
Preliminary 2	Andrew Rogers	Montgomery, MN	Preliminary 8	Neil Jones	Mankato, MN
Preliminary 3	John Bowman	Surrey, UK	Preliminary 9	Rodel Tuazon	Des Moines, IA
Preliminary 4	Marissa Chien	Las Vegas, NV	Preliminary 10	Stan Poczatek	Woodbridge, VA
Preliminary 5	John Woods	Abbey, UK	Preliminary 11	Ed Betzel	Fraser, MI
Preliminary 6	Robert Brown	Shiawassee, MI	Preliminary 12	Rick Berger	Melbourne, FL
Semi-final 1	Andrew Rogers		Semi-final 2	Rodel Tuazon	
Preliminary 13	Gagan Virk	Sylmar, CA	Preliminary 19	D.K. Thomas	San Pedro, CA
Preliminary 14	Jason Martyn	Ipswich, UK	Preliminary 20	Victoria Wale	Princes Risborough, UK
Preliminary 15	Jerry Schrader	Woodbridge, VA	Preliminary 21	Bruce Spencer	Pensacola, FL
Preliminary 16	Bill Sheldon	Cape May, NJ	Preliminary 22	Walter Graden	Statham, GA
Preliminary 17	Jon Davies	Albrighton, UK	Preliminary 23	Ben Ludwig	Collegeville, PA
Preliminary 18	Marlon Delinois	Spring Valley, NY	Preliminary 24	Steve Goodemote	Canandaigua, NY
Semi-final 3	Jerry Schrader		Semi-final 4	Ben Ludwig	
Preliminary 25	Kristian Gilleland	Conway, SC	Preliminary 31	Carl Olson	Seattle, WA
Preliminary 26	Rob Sherwood	Manchester, UK	Preliminary 32	Zack Williamson	Ontario, CAN
Preliminary 27	Dale Rodda	Frankston, AUS	Preliminary 33	Ryan Hall	Sheffield, UK
Preliminary 28	John Ritchie	Dundee, Scotland	Preliminary 34	Dennis Waterman	Sedona, AZ
Preliminary 29	Keith Hubbard	Brampton, Ontario	Preliminary 35	Jason Phipps	Omaha, NE
Preliminary 30	Toly Braylovsky	Hamden, CT	Preliminary 36	Clayton Mozdzen	Stonewall, Manitoba
Semi-final 5	Rob Sherwood		Semi-final 6	Dennis Waterman	

=== Final table ===
Finish	Player	Total cash winnings
1	Rodel Tuazon	$1,075,000
2	Dennis Waterman	$75,000
3	Rob Sherwood	$75,000
4	Ben Ludwig	$75,000
5	Andrew Rogers	$75,000
6	Jerry Schrader	$75,000

== World Pro-Am Challenge ==
On July 12, 2006, The Poker Dome played host to the World Pro-Am Challenge, with a US$1,000,000 prize pool. Three professional players were pitted against three amateur online qualifiers, who had access to three other pros for coaching. The top three spots paid, and if an amateur cashed the prize money would be split with the coach. Each amateur started with $20,000 more in chips than the pros and each amateur/coach team was allowed two time-outs, one called by the player and one by the coach.

Position	Player	Hometown	Coach	Payout
1	Gavin Smith	Guelph, Ontario		$500,000
2	Scott Gardner	Spalding, UK	Michael Gracz	$270,000 ($30,000 to Gracz)
3	John Gale	Bushey, UK		$200,000
4	Todd Brunson	Las Vegas, NV		$0
5	Joe Isaacson	Eau Claire, WI	Kenna James	$0
6	Andy Stoll	Cincinnati, OH	Tony G	$0
