= Cory Carroll =

Canadian poker player

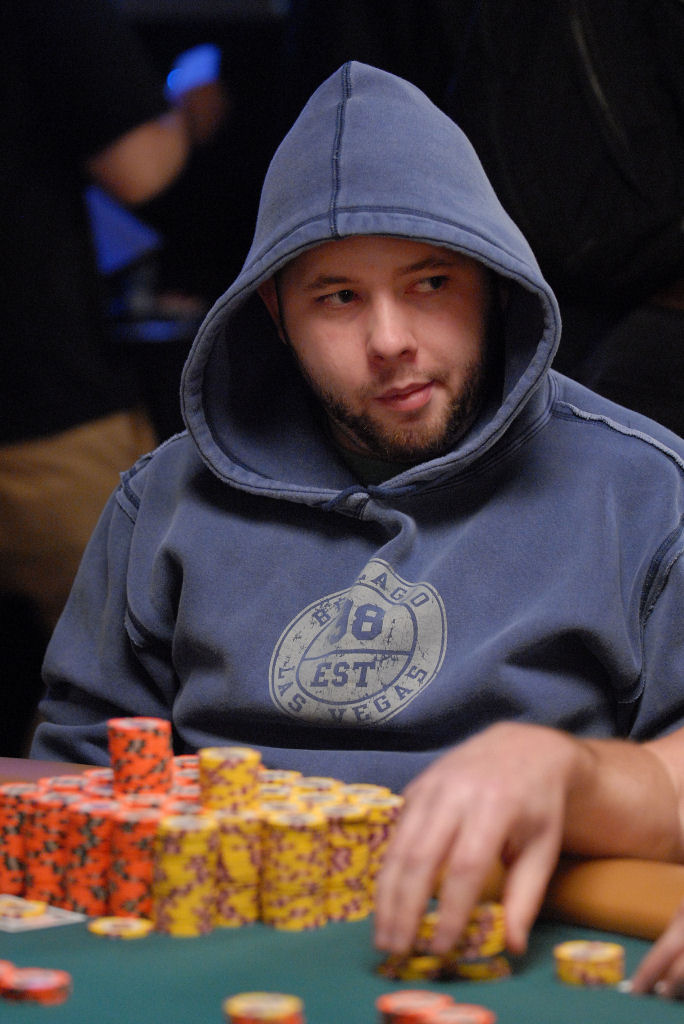
- Carroll at the 2007 World Series of Poker.
- Nickname: UGOTPZD
- Born: February 25; Halifax, Nova Scotia, Canada

World Series of Poker
- Bracelet: None
- Money finish: 1
- Highest WSOP Main Event finish: 91st, 2007

World Poker Tour
- Title: None
- Final tables: 2
- Money finishes: 2

Cory Carroll (born February 25 in Halifax, Nova Scotia) is a Canadian professional poker player, who is a two time final tablist of World Poker Tour Championships and the winner of a World Series of Poker (WSOP) Circuit Championship Event.

== Online poker ==
Carroll has made at least two final tables in the "Sunday Million", a $215 buy-in tournament with a $1 Million Guaranteed prize-pool on PokerStars. On October 15, 2006, Carroll, under the screenname "UGOTPZD", came in third place in the Sunday Million, earning $55,289.86. A month later he finished runner-up in the November 5 Sunday Million, earning $119,091.

== World Series of Poker ==
In 2007, Carroll cashed in the money for the first time in the $10,000 No Limit Hold'em Main Event Championship coming in 91st place out of a field of 6,358 players, earning $67,535.

In April–May 2007, Carroll won the $5,000 Championship Event of the WSOP Circuit stop at Caesars Palace in Las Vegas, defeating a field of 336 entrants and beating Justin Pechie heads-up to win a gold ring and the top prize.

== World Poker Tour ==
Carroll finished runner up to Jonathan Little during Sixth season of the World Poker Tour (WPT) Mirage Poker Showdown, earning $561,369.

Carroll was second in chips to Gus Hansen at the final table of the 2008 Five-Star World Poker Classic (the $25,500 WPT Championship) when Carroll Holding A♦ J♠ was busted by Hansen holding 7♦ 5♦ when the a flop came Q♣ J♦ 6♦, Hansen with chip lead moved all-in, after a moment of thinking, Carroll called and was ahead in the hand with a pair of Jacks vs Hansen flush draw, the turn was the Q♥ leaving only one card to come, but when the river brought the 3♦ it gave Hansen a flush that won the hand and eliminating Carroll from the tournament in fourth place, earning him $593,645. This left Hansen to exclaim to himself, as picked up by the television telecast microphones, "Insanity prevails, insanity prevails.

As of 2008, his total live tournament winnings exceed $1,800,000.

Carroll's cashes after 2008 have been smaller. They include a 112th-place finish in a $1,500 No Limit Hold'em event at the 2009 World Series of Poker ($3,352), and 41st in a $1,500 shootout event at the 2010 World Series of Poker ($5,620). In July 2013, he finished 12th in the $5,000 CPPT Main Event of the Venetian DeepStack Extravaganza ($25,109).

As of October 2026, Carroll's recorded live tournament earnings total about $1.85 million from 14 cashes, with his most recent recorded cash in August 2023.
