= Christina Pie =

American poker player

World Series of Poker
- Bracelet: 1
- Money finishes: 2

Christina Pie was a World Series of Poker champion in the 1999 $1,000 Ladies - Limit 7 Card Stud.

As of 2024, her live tournament winnings exceed $86,000.

== World Series of Poker bracelets ==
Year	Tournament	Prize (US$)
1999	$1,000 Ladies - Limit 7 Card Stud	$34,000
