= John Juanda =

Indonesian poker player (born 1971)

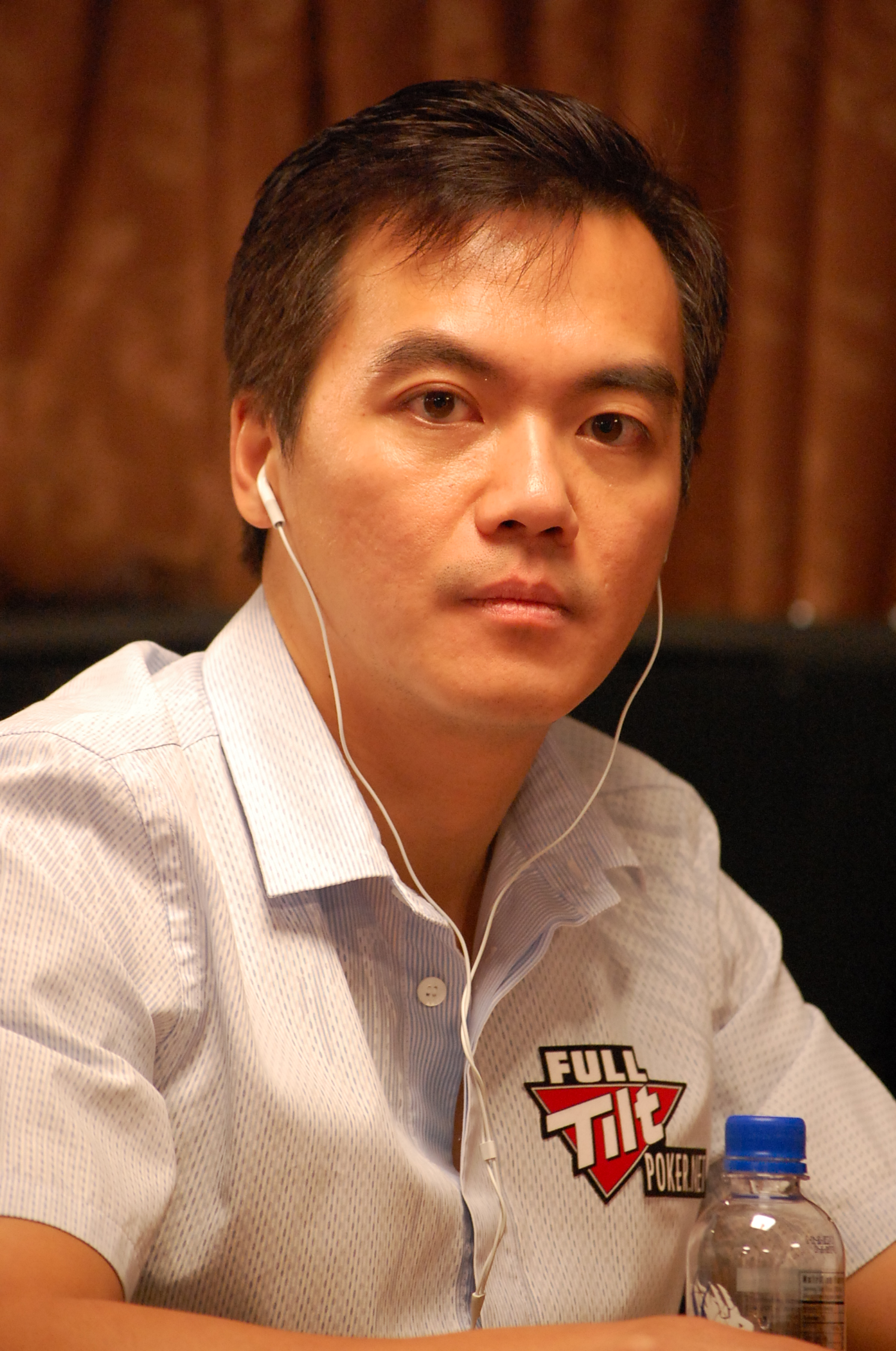
- Juanda at the 2008 World Series of Poker
- Nicknames: JJ, Luckbox
- Born: 8 July 1971 (age 55); Medan, North Sumatra, Indonesia

World Series of Poker
- Bracelets: 5
- Final tables: 32
- Money finishes: 65
- Highest WSOP Main Event finish: 31st, 2005

World Poker Tour
- Title: None
- Final tables: 6
- Money finishes: 19

European Poker Tour
- Title: 1
- Final tables: 3
- Money finishes: 5

Johnson "John" Juanda (born 8 July 1971) is an Indonesian professional poker player of Chinese descent based in Tokyo, Japan. He has won five World Series of Poker bracelets.

== Personal life ==
Juanda was born into a Hoklo family in Medan, North Sumatra, Indonesia on 8 July 1971. He was a high school track star for the 200 meter sprints to 5000 meters races. Juanda arrived in the United States in 1990 to enroll at Oklahoma State University. He earned an MBA from Seattle University.

Juanda speaks Mandarin Chinese and English. He currently resides in Tokyo, Japan.

== Poker career ==
In both 2001 and 2002, Juanda was Card Player Magazine's tournament Player of the Year, winning four World Series of Poker titles, and a World Poker Open Championship title. In November 2004, he won the inaugural Professional Poker Tour event at the Foxwoods Casino in Connecticut.

In November 2005, Juanda earned nearly $500,000 in Monte Carlo, Monaco after winning the Monte Carlo Millions Consolation tournament, finishing sixth in the Monte Carlo Millions Main Event, and finishing second at "The FullTiltPoker.Net Invitational Live from Monte Carlo." In January 2006, Juanda defeated a field including Jeff Lisandro, Mike Sexton, Barry Greenstein, Tony Bloom, Tony G, and Phil Ivey to win the A$1,000,000 ($732,901) first prize in the Crown Australian Poker Championship A$100,000 speed poker event. Juanda won the 2008 World Series of Poker Europe £10,000 No Limit Holdem Main Event, earning £868,800 ($1,580,096). A little over a week later, he finished runner-up to Jason Mercier at the European Poker Tour's London £1 Million Showdown, a non-title no limit holdem event also known as the £20,000 High Roller event, earning £327,000 ($598,770).

Juanda has made seven WPT final tables, including a runner-up finish in the 2002–03 Five Diamond World Poker Classic.

In 2012, Juanda earned his largest cash at the time with a fifth-place finish in the Macau High Stakes Challenge Super High Roller for HK$12,765,000 ($1,645,756).

In 2015, Juanda was selected to be part of the Poker Hall of Fame along with Jennifer Harman of Reno, Nevada. In the same year, he won the EPT Main Event at Barcelona for €1,022,593.

In 2017, Juanda earned his largest tournament cash to date in the Triton Poker Super High Roller Main Event for HK$22,410,400 ($2,870,092).

As of 2025, his total live tournament winnings exceed $26.3 million. Juanda's 93 cashes at the WSOP account for $5.4 million of his live tournament winnings. He has won five WSOP bracelets.

=== World Series of Poker bracelets ===
WSOP Bracelets
Year	Tournament	Prize (US$)
2002	$1,500 Triple Draw Lowball Ace to Five	$49,620
2003	$2,500 Seven Card Stud Hi-Lo Split	$130,200
2003	$2,500 Pot Limit Omaha	$203,840
2008E	£10,000 No Limit Hold'em Main Event	$1,539,250
2011	$10,000 2–7 Draw Lowball Championship	$367,170

An "E" following a year denotes bracelet(s) won at the World Series of Poker Europe
