= World Poker Tour season 7 results =

Below are the results of season seven of the World Poker Tour (2008-2009).

== Results ==
=== Spanish Championship ===
- Casino: Casino Barcelona, Barcelona
- Buy-in: €5,000
- 5-Day Event: Friday, May 23, 2008 to Tuesday, May 27, 2008
- Number of Entries: 253
- Total Prize Pool: €1,278,396 ($1,993,072)
- Number of Payouts: 27
- Winning Hand: A 2

Final Table
Place	Name	Prize
1st	Casper Hansen	€425,000 ($662,592)
2nd	Stefan Mattsson	€220,000 ($342,989)
3rd	Thiago Nishijima	€112,300 ($175,080)
4th	Andres Vidal	€87,400 ($136,260)
5th	Guy Sitbon	€75,000 ($116,928)
6th	Martin Lundenius	€62,300 ($97,128)

=== Bellagio Cup IV ===
- Casino: Bellagio, Las Vegas
- Buy-in: $15,000
- 7-Day Event: Friday, July 11, 2008 to Thursday, July 17, 2008
- Number of Entries: 446
- Total Prize Pool: $6,489,300
- Number of Payouts: 100
- Winning Hand: Q♥ 9♠

Final Table
Place	Name	Prize
1st	Mike Watson	$1,673,770
2nd	David Benyamine	$840,295
3rd	Luke Staudenmaier	$452,465
4th	Ralph Perry	$290,900
5th	John Phan	$193,915
6th	Gabriel Thaler	$129,275

=== Legends of Poker ===
- Casino: Bicycle Casino, Los Angeles
- Buy-in: $10,000
- 6-Day Event: Saturday, August 23, 2008 to Thursday, August 28, 2008
- Number of Entries: 373
- Total Prize Pool: $3,520,738
- Number of Payouts: 36
- Winning Hand: 3♠ 3♥

Final Table
Place	Name	Prize
1st	John Phan	$1,116,428
2nd	Amit Makhija	$563,320
3rd	Zachary Clark	$281,645
4th	Paul Smith	$246,450
5th	Trong Nguyen	$211,245
6th	Kyle Wilson	$176,035

=== Borgata Poker Open ===
- Casino: Borgata, Atlantic City
- Buy-in: $10,000
- 5-Day Event: Sunday, September 14, 2008 to Thursday, September 18, 2008
- Number of Entries: 516
- Total Prize Pool: $5,000,000
- Number of Payouts: 54
- Winning Hand: A♦ J♠

Final Table
Place	Name	Prize
1st	Vivek Rajkumar	$1,424,500
2nd	Sang Kim	$750,000
3rd	Dan Heimiller	$387,500
4th	Jason Strochak	$337,500
5th	Mark Seif	$287,500
6th	Andrew Knee	$237,500

=== North American Poker Championship ===
- Casino: Fallsview Casino Resort, Niagara Falls, Ontario, Canada
- Buy-in: Can$10,000 (US$8,500)
- 7-Day Event: Friday, October 10, 2008 to Thursday, October 16, 2008
- Number of Entries: 454
- Total Prize Pool: Can$4,374,475 (US$3,829,391)
- Number of Payouts: 45
- Winning Hand: A♠ K♠

Final Table
Place	Name	Prize
1st	Glen Witmer	Can$1,250,352 (US$1,084,256)
2nd	Gavin Smith	Can$612,427 (US$542,129)
3rd	Kathy Liebert	Can$319,337 (US$282,682)
4th	Ryan Fisler	Can$262,469 (US$232,341)
5th	Marc Karam	Can$196,851 (US$174,255)
6th	James Trenholm	Can$153,107 (US$135,533)

=== Festa Al Lago ===
- Casino: Bellagio, Las Vegas
- Buy-in: $15,000
- 7-Day Event: Monday, October 20, 2008 to Sunday, October 26, 2008
- Number of Entries: 368
- Total Prize Pool: $5,354,000
- Number of Payouts: 50
- Winning Hand: 10♥ 10♠

Final Table
Place	Name	Prize
1st	Bertrand Grospellier	$1,411,015
2nd	Nam Le	$943,215
3rd	Osmin Dardon	$506,245
4th	Nenad Medic	$373,010
5th	Adam Levy	$266,445
6th	Will Mietz	$186,510

=== Foxwoods World Poker Finals ===
- Casino: Foxwoods, Mashantucket, Connecticut
- Buy-in: $10,000
- 7-Day Event: Wednesday, November 5, 2008 to Tuesday, November 11, 2008
- Number of Entries: 412
- Total Prize Pool: $3,876,508
- Number of Payouts: 50
- Winning Hand: A♣ Q♥

Final Table
Place	Name	Prize
1st	Jonathan Little	$1,120,310
2nd	Jonathan Jaffe	$670,636
3rd	Charles Marchese	$337,256
4th	David Pham	$240,344
5th	Jack Schanbacher	$182,196
6th	Mike Matusow	$124,048

=== Doyle Brunson Five Diamond World Poker Classic ===
- Casino: Bellagio, Las Vegas
- Buy-in: $15,000
- 7-Day Event: Saturday, December 13, 2008 to Friday, December 19, 2008
- Number of Entries: 497
- Total Prize Pool: $7,231,350
- Number of Payouts: 100
- Winning Hand: K♦ K♠

Final Table
Place	Name	Prize
1st	David Rheem	$1,538,730
2nd	Justin Young	$936,760
3rd	Evan McNiff	$540,440
4th	Steve Sung	$396,205
5th	Amnon Filippi	$288,235
6th	Hoyt Corkins	$216,175

=== Southern Poker Championship ===
- Casino: Beau Rivage, Biloxi
- Buy-in: $10,000
- 4-Day Event: Wednesday, January 14, 2009 to Saturday, January 17, 2009
- Number of Entries: 283
- Total Prize Pool: $2,662,747
- Number of Payouts: 27
- Winning Hand: A♦ 4♥

Final Table
Place	Name	Prize
1st	Allen Carter	$1,025,500
2nd	Bobby Suer	$501,028
3rd	Soheil Shamseddin	$263,725
4th	Hilbert Shirey	$184,607
5th	Tyler Smith	$134,500
6th	Chuck Kim	$105,490

=== L.A. Poker Classic ===
- Casino: Commerce Casino, Los Angeles
- Buy-in: $10,000
- 6-Day Event: Saturday, February 21, 2009 to Thursday, February 26, 2009
- Number of Entries: 696
- Total Prize Pool: $6,681,600
- Number of Payouts: 63
- Winning Hand: K♣ 5♣

Final Table
Place	Name	Prize
1st	Cornel Andrew Cimpan	$1,686,760
2nd	Binh Nguyen	$935,424
3rd	Mike Sowers	$654,797
4th	Chris Karagulleyan	$430,963
5th	Pat Walsh	$310,694
6th	Chris Ferguson	$240,538

=== WPT Celebrity Invitational ===
- Casino: Commerce Casino, Los Angeles
- Buy-in:
- 2-Day Event: February 28, 2009
- Number of Entries: 433
- Total Prize Pool: $200,000
- Number of Payouts: 6
- Winning Hand: 8♥ 8♠

Final Table
Place	Name	Prize
1st	Freddy Deeb	$100,000
2nd	Nicholas Gonzalez	$50,000
3rd	Tom Hall	$20,000
4th	Scott Clements	$15,000
5th	Ottavio Tassone	$10,000
6th	Jose Taveres	$5,000

=== Bay 101 Shooting Star ===
- Casino: Bay 101, San Jose, California
- Buy-in: $10,000
- 5-Day Event: Monday, March 16, 2009 to Friday, March 20, 2009
- Number of Entries: 391
- Total Prize Pool: $3 714 500
- Number of Payouts: 45
- Winning Hand: A♣ 9♥

Final Table
Place	Name	Prize
1st	Steve Brecher	$1,025,500
2nd	Kathy Liebert	$550,000
3rd	Chris Moore	$291,500
4th	Tony Behari	$230,000
5th	Thao Le	$180,000
6th	Chau Vu	$135,000

=== Foxwoods Poker Classic ===
- Casino: Foxwoods, Mashantucket, Connecticut
- Buy-in: $10,000
- 6-Day Event: Friday, April 3, 2009 to Wednesday, April 8, 2009
- Number of Entries: 259
- Total Prize Pool: $2,436,930
- Number of Payouts: 30
- Winning Hand: 7♠ 6♠

Final Table
Place	Name	Prize
1st	Vadim Trincher	$731,079
2nd	Amnon Filippi	$409,405
3rd	Lenny Cortellino	$214,449
4th	Matt Casterella	$138,905
5th	Alex Perelberg	$106,007
6th	Joe Raposa	$85,292

=== WPT World Championship ===
- Casino: Bellagio, Las Vegas
- Buy-in: $25,000
- 8-Day Event: Saturday, April 18, 2009 to Saturday, April 25, 2009
- Number of Entries: 338
- Total Prize Pool: $8,172,250
- Number of Payouts: 50
- Winning Hand: A♠ 3♣

Final Table
Place	Name	Prize
1st	Yevgeniy Timoshenko	$2,143,655
2nd	Ran Azor	$1,441,975
3rd	Bertrand Grospellier	$773,940
4th	Christian Harder	$570,265
5th	Shannon Shorr	$407,340
6th	Scotty Nguyen	$285,135

== Other Events ==
During season 7 of the WPT there were two special events that did not apply to the Player of the Year standings:

- The LA Poker Classic Heads Up Championship - February 18–20, 2009 - Commerce Casino - prelude to Event #10: L.A. Poker Classic
- The WPT Celebrity Invitational - Feb 28 - Mar 2, 2009 - Commerce Casino - postscript to Event #10: L.A. Poker Classic
