= John Esposito (poker player) =

American poker player

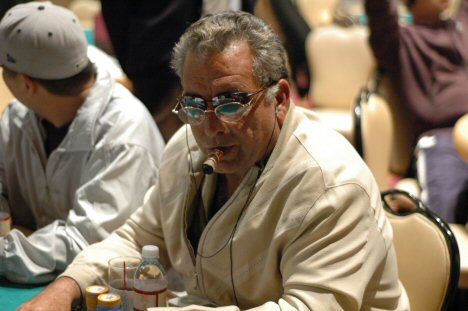
- John Esposito in World Poker Tour / PPT / Mirage Poker Showdown 2005

World Series of Poker
- Bracelet: 1
- Final tables: 8
- Money finishes: 43
- Highest WSOP Main Event finish: 11th, 1989

World Poker Tour
- Title: None
- Final table: 1
- Money finishes: 7

John Esposito Jr (born June 7) is an American professional poker player who won a World Series of Poker bracelet in Limit Hold'em. Esposito has 43 money finishes at the World Series of Poker (WSOP) including eight final tables and seven cashes in the $10,000 No Limit Hold'em Main Event.

== Poker career ==
Esposito has been a regular on the poker tournament circuit since 1985 and has won numerous titles in different poker variants. He first cashed in the World Series of Poker in 1987 in the $1,500 No Limit Hold'em event.

He won his bracelet with a first place finish in the $2,500 Limit Hold'em at the 1999 World Series of Poker beating out fellow professional Mimi Tran heads-up, earning a cash prize of $219,225. That final table also included top tournament players T. J. Cloutier and David Chiu.

Esposito also has multiple high finishes in the $10,000 Main Event Championship including 11th in 1989, 12th in 1995, 19th in 1996 26th in 2001, 108th in 2004 and 32nd in the 2011 WSOP.

He has participated on the World Poker Tour and has cashed in four WPT tournaments. His highest finish on the WPT so far is an 11th place in the 2004 Poker Million Cruise event.

As of 2019, Esposito's total live tournament winnings exceed $3,650,000 His 43 cashes at the WSOP account for over $1,700,000 of those winnings.

=== World Series of Poker Bracelet ===
| Year | Event | Prize (US$) |
|---|---|---|
| 1999 | $2,500 Limit Hold'em | $219,225 |
