= Lee Markholt =

American poker player (born 1963)

- Nickname: Seattle Set
- Born: May 24, 1963 (age 63); Tacoma, Washington, U.S.

World Series of Poker
- Bracelet: None
- Money finishes: 40
- Highest WSOP Main Event finish: 400

World Poker Tour
- Title: 1
- Final tables: 4
- Money finishes: 28

European Poker Tour
- Title: None
- Final table: None
- Money finishes: 7

Lee Markholt (born May 24, 1963 in Tacoma, Washington) is a professional poker player from Tacoma, Washington. A former bull rider, he has been playing poker professionally for more than 29 years.

Markholt's first major win came on the Professional Poker Tour when he won the Five Star World Poker Classic in 2005. He has had success in both the World Series of Poker and the World Poker Tour in his career. He has 40 career WSOP cashes, including 5 final tables. He has cashed 28 times in the WPT, including six cashes each in Season 5 and Season 6. He reached his first WPT final table at the World Poker Challenge in 2008, claiming his first WPT title and the $493,815 first prize.

As of 2024, his total live tournament winnings exceed $4,600,000.
