= Glenn Cozen =

American poker player (born 1960)

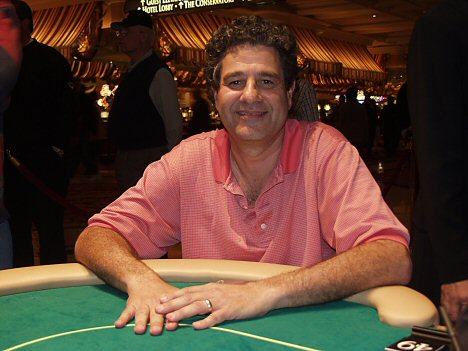
- Cozen at the 2004 World Poker Tour 5 Diamond WPC
- Born: 1960 (age 65–66)

World Series of Poker
- Bracelet: None
- Money finishes: 7
- Highest WSOP Main Event finish: 2nd, 1993

Glenn Cozen (born 1960) is an American professional poker player from Pasadena, California, who is best known for his second-place finish in the $10,000 buy-in Main Event at the 1993 World Series of Poker.

Despite being a relatively unknown player before the tournament, Cozen managed to make the final table of the main event. He was short stacked throughout the final table but was able to outlast several top professionals at the final table, including 1990 world champion Mansour Matloubi and bracelet winner John Bonetti who had much larger chip stacks than he had. Cozen made it to heads-up play but was extremely short-stacked by this time and he was defeated by Jim Bechtel on the third hand of heads-up play. He won $420,000 for his second-place finish.

Cozen has a total of three cashes in the WSOP Main Event: 2nd in 1993, 114th in 1995, and 200th in 2008.

Cozen has a total of seven cashes at the WSOP and has competed in various other poker tournaments through the years. He won the $1,000 Limit Hold'em event at Amarillo Slim's Super Bowl of Poker in 1989. He won the $1,000 Ace to Five event at the Queens Poker Classic IV in 1994. Cozen's most recent tournament win was the $2,500 Pot Limit Omaha event at the Five Diamond Poker Classic in 2004, earning over $105,000.

During his career, Cozen has cashed in more than thirty tournaments and has tournament winnings totaling over $860,000. His seven cashes as the WSOP account for $521,090 of those winnings.
