= 1999 World Series of Poker =

Series of poker tournaments

- Location: Binion's Horseshoe, Las Vegas, Nevada
- Dates: April 26 – May 15

Champion
- (Republic of Ireland) Noel Furlong

The 1999 World Series of Poker (WSOP) was a series of poker tournaments held at Binion's Horseshoe.

== Events ==
There were 15 preliminary bracelet events at the 1999 World Series of Poker.

#	Date	Event	Entries	Winner	Prize	Runner-up	Results
1	April 26, 1999	$1,500 Limit Hold'em	609	Charles Brahmi (1/1)	$338,000	John Bonetti (0/3)	Results
2	April 27, 1999	$1,500 Razz	141	Paul Clark (1/2)	$84,610	Simon Zhang	Results
3	April 28, 1999	$2,500 Limit Hold'em	237	John Esposito (1/1)	$219,225	Mimi Tran	Results
4	April 29, 1999	$2,500 Seven Card Stud	199	David Grey (1/1)	$199,000	Eli Balas (0/1)	Results
5	April 30, 1999	$2,500 Pot Limit Omaha w/Rebuys	111	Hassan Kamoei (1/1)	$173,000	Norbert Hoelting	Results
6	May 1, 1999	$2,500 Seven Card Stud Hi-Lo Split	170	Ron Long (1/1)	$170,000	Brian Nadell	Results
7	May 2, 1999	$2,500 No Limit Hold'em	307	Eric Holum (1/1)	$283,975	Ted Forrest (0/3)	Results
8	May 3, 1999	$2,500 Limit Omaha	104	Tom Franklin (1/1)	$104,000	Erik Alps	Results
9	May 4, 1999	$2,500 Omaha Hi-Lo Split	186	Steve Badger (1/1)	$186,000	Larry Anderson	Results
10	May 5, 1999	$3,000 Limit Hold'em	169	Josh Arieh (1/1)	$202,800	Humberto Brenes (0/2)	Results
11	May 6, 1999	$3,500 No Limit Hold'em	205	Mike Matusow (1/1)	$265,475	Alex Brenes	Results
12	May 7, 1999	$3,000 Pot Limit Hold'em	187	Layne Flack (1/1)	$224,400	Matt Lefkowitz	Results
13	May 8, 1999	$5,000 Limit Hold'em	110	Eli Balas (1/2)	$220,000	Annie Duke	Results
14	May 9, 1999	$1,500 Omaha Hi-Lo Split	243	Mike Wattel (1/1)	$134,865	Ed Smith	Results
15	May 9, 1999	$1,000 Ladies' Seven Card Stud	85	Christina Pie (1/1)	$34,000	LaVonne Joyce	Results
16	May 10, 1999	$10,000 No Limit Hold'em Main Event	393	Noel Furlong (1/1)	$1,000,000	Alan Goehring	Results

== Main Event ==
There were 393 entrants to the main event. Each paid $10,000 to enter the tournament, with the top 36 players finishing in the money. At the 1999 Main Event final table, Huck Seed was attempting to become a two-time World Champion. His attempt fell short as he was eliminated in sixth place.

=== Final table ===
Name	Number of chips (percentage of total)	WSOP Bracelets*	WSOP Cashes*	WSOP Earnings*
(Republic of Ireland) Noel Furlong	1,544,000 (39.2%)	0	2	$70,785
(United States) Alan Goehring	828,000 (21.0%)	0	2	$68,005
(Republic of Ireland) Padraig Parkinson	674,000 (17.1%)	0	0	0
(United States) Huck Seed	402,000 (10.2%)	2	14	$1,447,144
(Switzerland) Chris Bigler	319,000 (8.1%)	0	0	0
(United States) Erik Seidel	167,000 (4.2%)	4	20	$1,297,646

*Career statistics prior to the beginning of the 1999 Main Event.

=== Final table results ===
Place	Name	Prize
1st	Noel Furlong	$1,000,000
2nd	Alan Goehring	$768,625
3rd	Padraig Parkinson	$489,125
4th	Erik Seidel	$279,500
5th	Chris Bigler	$212,420
6th	Huck Seed	$167,700

=== In The Money Finishes ===
NB: This list is restricted to In The Money finishers with an existing Wikipedia entry.

Place	Name	Prize
12th	Randy Holland	$44,720
16th	James Van Alstyne	$33,540
19th	John Hennigan	$27,950
21st	Hal Kant	$27,950
