= Chau Giang =

American poker player (born 1955)

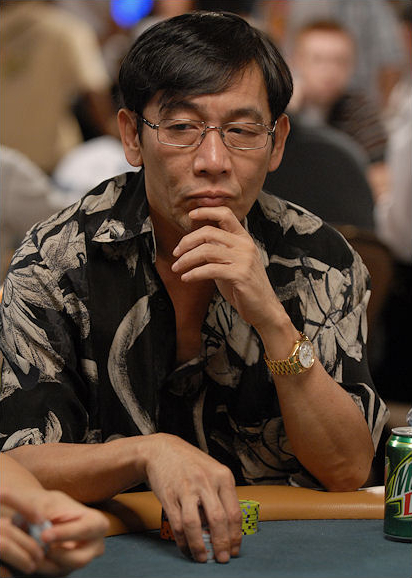
- Giang at the 2008 World Series of Poker
- Born: July 2, 1955 (age 71)

World Series of Poker
- Bracelets: 3
- Money finishes: 51
- Highest WSOP Main Event finish: 13th, 1996

World Poker Tour
- Title: None
- Final tables: 3
- Money finishes: 13

Chau Tu Giang (born July 2, 1955) is an American professional poker player who is a three-time World Series of Poker bracelet winner and a three-time final tablist of the World Poker Tour with over $3 million in live tournament winnings alone.

== Biography ==
Giang fled Vietnam in a small boat in the late 1970s and arrived in Denver, Colorado, working minimum wage jobs. It was then that he began to learn poker. He moved to Florida soon after, taking a job as a chef at $160 per week. His poker success led him to move to Las Vegas, where he made more than $100,000 in his first year as a professional player.

== Poker career ==
He first had success at the World Series of Poker (WSOP) in 1993, where he finished 2nd in the $1,500 Pot Limit Hold'em event to John Bonetti, and winning his first bracelet in the $1,500 Ace to Five Draw event the same year.

He first cashed in the WSOP Main Event in 1996, finishing in 13th place. He won a second bracelet in the $2,000 Omaha 8 or Better event in 1998, and a third bracelet in the $2,000 Pot Limit Omaha event in 2004, finishing ahead of Robert Williamson III, Dave Colclough and Chris Ferguson.

Giang used to play online at Full Tilt Poker under the user name "La Key U" and was signed as a Pro in January 2009. He earned 2.1 million playing online in 2008.

As of 2022, his total live tournament winnings exceed $3,700,000. His 51 cashes as the WSOP account for $1,767,062 of those winnings. He is in 8th for most all time cashes at the WSOP.

=== World Series of Poker bracelets ===
Year	Tournament	Prize (US$)
1993	$1,500 No Limit Ace to Five Draw	$82,800
1998	$2,000 Omaha 8 or Better	$150,960
2004	$2,000 Pot Limit Omaha	$187,920

=== The big game ===
Giang avoided playing tournaments other than the WSOP for many years, as he preferred to concentrate on his cash game play, where he plays $4,000/$8,000 limit regularly. Giang is a regular in "The Big Game" in Las Vegas, alongside his next-door neighbor Doyle Brunson. He returned to tournaments when his children asked him why he was not on television. His first World Poker Tour (WPT) cash was 9th place in the first WPT Championship. He would also cash in the second WPT Championship. However, his largest tournament prize to date was 2nd place in the 2005 $10,000 World Poker Open, which earned him $773,448.

=== Poker philosophy ===
Giang has regularly stated that poker is not a game of chance. In a 1994 interview, he said, "At the table I hear people say, ‘Poker is luck.’ That is 100 percent wrong. If they are losing, it is because they're doing something wrong. Poker is skill, it isn't luck. In the long run, day after day after day, you cannot get lucky all the time." In the book Deal Me In, Giang said "Poker is a game of skill with an element of luck, not a game of luck with an element of skill." He discusses how he lost his twenty million dollar bankroll playing craps, a game of luck. He says nowadays he gets a physical revulsion when he goes near a game of craps, or any game of dice. He believes that if he sticks to poker, he will always make money in the long run.

== Personal life ==
Giang is divorced and has three children.
