= Roy Winston (poker player) =

American entrepreneur and poker player

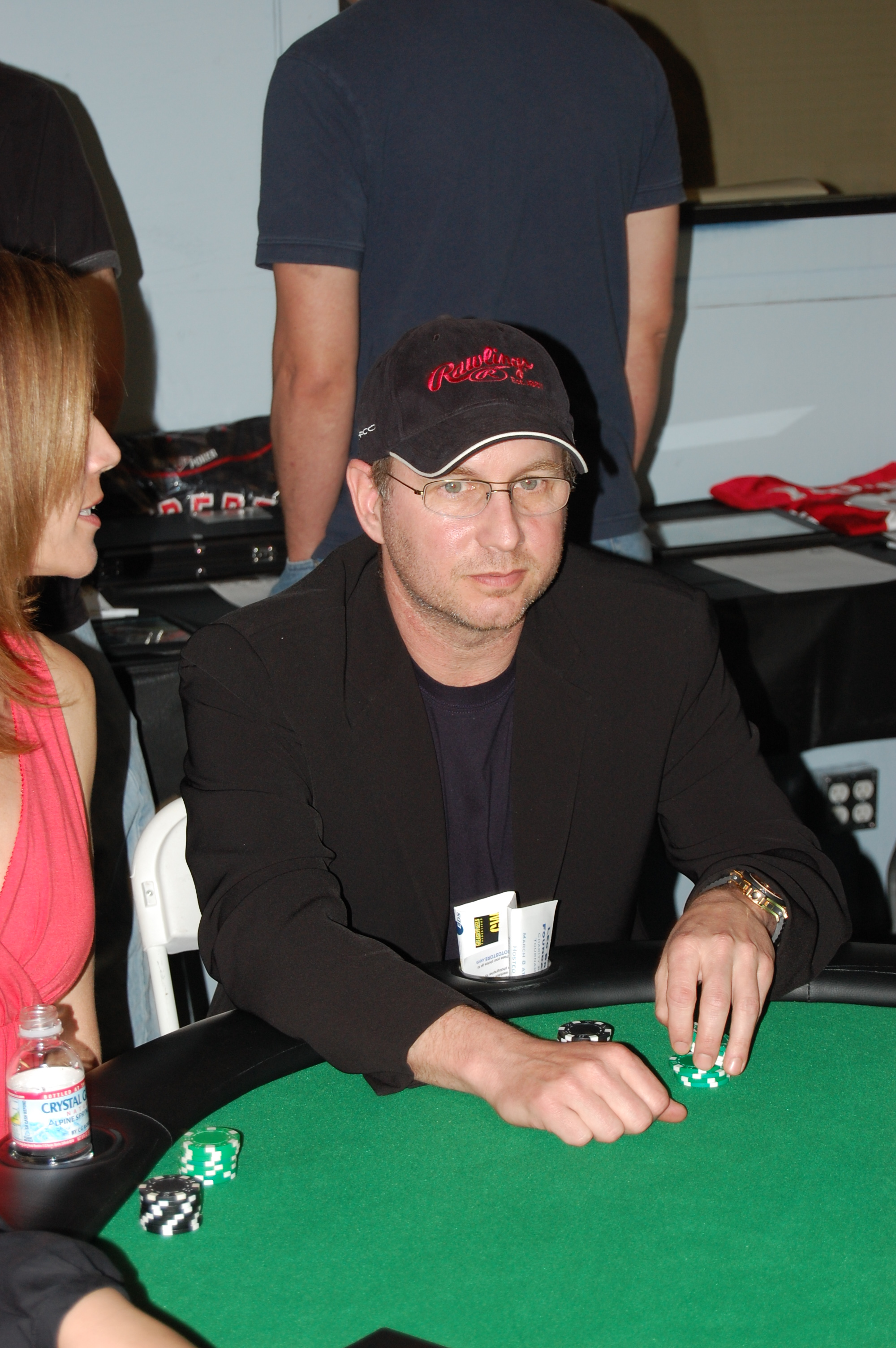
- Nickname: The Oracle

World Series of Poker
- Bracelet: None
- Money finishes: 5
- Highest WSOP Main Event finish: 26th, 2007

World Poker Tour
- Title: 1
- Final table: 1
- Money finishes: 7

Roy S. Winston (born March 5) is an American physician, entrepreneur and professional poker player, founder and CEO of LaserAway, LLC and a former C-Suite Executive for Pacira Biosciences from Brooklyn, New York. He won the World Poker Tour Borgata Main Event championship in 2007 for over $1.5 million.

== Biography ==
Winston, who was raised in New York City and attended Stuyvesant High School, received a degree from the University of Pennsylvania and a Doctor of Medicine from the Mount Sinai School of Medicine. He completed an anesthesiology residency at the University of Florida College of Medicine. Dr. Winston was a professor of anesthesiology at Emory University and The University of California and was appointed to the Georgia Board of Medical Examiners by Governor Zell Miller. Dr. Winston founded LaserAway, LLC in Los Angeles, California; the company specializes in the removal of tattoos, sun damage and unwanted hair. He began playing tournament poker in 2006 and now plays full-time professionally and hosts high-stakes games at the Bicycle Casino in Los Angeles, California. Winston also writes a pro blog for Card Player and is a Full Tilt Pro on Full Tilt Poker.

== World Poker Tour ==
Winston has seven cashes in the World Poker Tour (WPT), most notably his victory at the WPT Borgata Poker Open that earned him $1,575,280 and the WPT title in a final table that included professional poker players Mike Matusow (6th), Gene Todd (5th), Mark Weitzman (4th), Haralabos Voulgaris (3rd) and amateur player Heung Yoon (runner-up). Other cashes at the WPT include the 2006 L.A. Poker Classic (23rd for $39,859), the Festa Al Lago V (46th for $16,700), the 2007 Doyle Brunson Five Diamond World Poker Classic (44th for $38,545), the 2008 Borgata Winter Open (39th for $17,213), and the Bellagio Cup IV in 2008 ($32,320).

== World Series of Poker ==
Winston has five cashes to date at the World Series of Poker (WSOP), most notably finishing in 26th place out of a field of 6,358 entries at the 2007 World Series of Poker Main Event and earning $333,490.

== Other poker events ==
Winston won the $2,000 buy-in No Limit Hold'em event at the Doyle Brunson Five Diamond World Poker Classic, earning $230,365. He has also cashed twice at the 2008 Aussie Millions Poker Championship finishing in fourth place in the A$2,000 Pot Limit Hold'em/Omaha/Omaha Hi-Lo mixed event for A$22,800 (US$20,042) and finishing in the semi-finals at the A$5,000 Australian Heads-Up Championship for A$40,000 ($35,161).

As of 2023, his total live tournament winnings are just short of $2,700,000. His cashes at the WSOP account for just over $358,000 of those winnings.
