= Thomas Chung (poker player) =

American poker player

World Series of Poker
- Bracelets: 2
- Money finishes: 13
- Highest WSOP Main Event finish: 5th, 1993

Thomas Chung is an American poker player from Federal Way, Washington, who has won two bracelets at the World Series of Poker.

Chung won his first bracelet in 1989 in the $2,000 Limit Hold'em event, winning a $212,000 cash prize in addition to the title. This was in his first cash in a WSOP event.

He won his second bracelet in 1991 in the $5,000 Seven Card Stud event, winning $142,000. He also made the final table of the WSOP Main Event in 1993, which was won by Jim Bechtel. Chung finished in 5th place in the 1993 Main Event, winning $72,000.

Since his 1993 Main Event cash, he has made numerous cashes and wins in various tournaments, both in the WSOP and in other events.

As of 2019, Chung has total tournament winnings exceeding $1,875,000. His 13 cashes at the World Series of Poker make up $590,967 of that total.

== World Series of Poker Bracelets ==
Year	Tournament	Prize (US$)
1989	$2,000 Limit Hold'em	$212,000
1991	$5,000 Seven Card Stud	$142,000
