= David Levi (poker player) =

Israeli footballer and poker player (born 1962)

David Levi דוד לוי
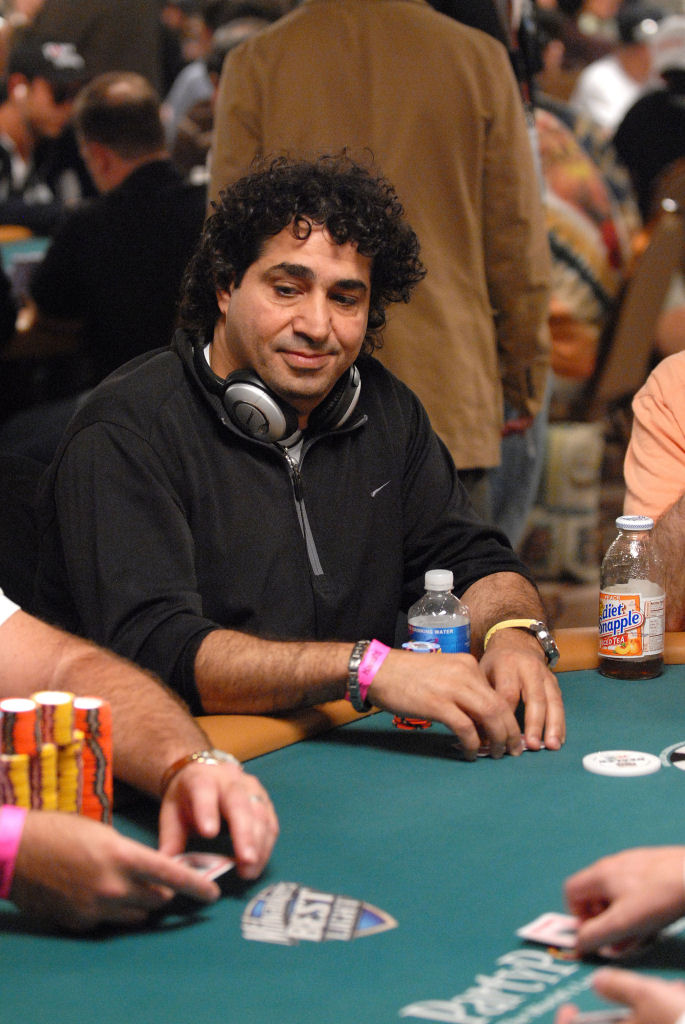
- Levi at the 2007 World Series of Poker.
- Born: 2 December 1962 (age 63); Tel Aviv, Israel

World Series of Poker
- Bracelet: None
- Money finishes: 37
- Highest WSOP Main Event finish: 121st, 2007

World Poker Tour
- Title: None
- Final table: 1
- Money finishes: 10

David Levi (Hebrew: דוד לוי; born 2 December 1962, in Tel Aviv, Israel) is an Israeli professional poker player and former professional footballer who in his poker career has won over $2.6 million in live tournaments.

Levi, who was born and raised in Israel, was a paratrooper in the Israel Defense Forces and then later played soccer professionally for Hapoel Ramat Gan. After his soccer career was cut short by a knee injury, he then moved to Los Angeles, California, where he was introduced to poker and was once the roommate of professional poker player and friend Amir Vahedi. A few years later he moved to Las Vegas, Nevada, where he currently resides.

As of 2020, his total live tournament winnings exceed $4,000,000. His 37 cashes at the WSOP account for $553,434 of those winnings.

== World Series of Poker ==
Levi has multiple cashes at the World Series of Poker (WSOP), which includes two final tables, and has made the final table of the 2005 WSOP Tournament of Champions. His highest finish in the Main Event was 121st in 2007.

== World Poker Tour ==
Levi has finished in the money at 10 World Poker Tour (WPT) championship events, making the final table in season six at the 2007 Mandalay Bay Poker Championship where he finished 3rd earning $229,540. He also made a final table of the WPT offspring known as the Professional Poker Tour, where he finished 3rd at the Mirage Poker Showdown event in 2005.

== Other poker events ==
Levi has over 20 first place victories in various event over his poker career. In April 2002, he won the '$3,100 No Limit Hold'em' event at the Bellagio High Buy-in Tournament Series, after he had defeated WPT Champion Alan Goehring during heads-up play, earning $159,468, winning the $1,500 Limit Hold'em event at the 2003 Bellagio Five-Diamond World Poker Classic, earning $144,917 and winning California State Poker Championship in 2000, earning $26,751, and then again in 2004, earning $99,745.
