= Chris Bigler =

Swiss poker player (born 1949)

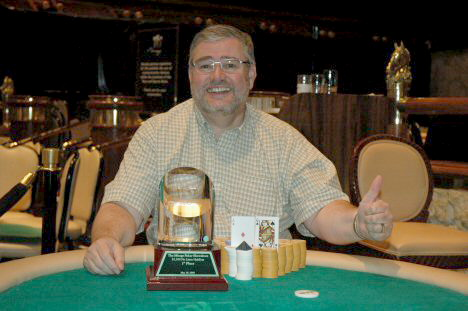
- Bigler after winning the 2005 Mirage Poker Showdown.
- Born: 11 February 1949 (age 77); Zurich, Switzerland

World Series of Poker
- Bracelet: None
- Money finishes: 6
- Highest WSOP Main Event finish: 5th, 1999

World Poker Tour
- Title: None
- Final tables: 2
- Money finishes: 8

Chris Bigler (born 11 February 1949, in Zurich) is a Swiss retired businessman and poker player.

Bigler began playing poker in 1997 on a trip to Las Vegas and studied the game. He made the final table of the 1999 World Series of Poker (WSOP) $10,000 no limit hold'em Main Event, earning $212,420 for his 5th-place finish. He is the only Swiss player to have made the final table of the WSOP main event.

Bigler also made two final tables during the first season of the World Poker Tour (WPT), finishing 5th during the inaugural WPT event, and runner-up to Paul Darden in the Gold Rush event.

In addition, he has finished 2nd in two events of the Professional Poker Tour (PPT) and was a quarter-finalist in the 2002 World Heads-Up Poker Championship.

As of 2015, his total live tournament winnings exceed $1,425,000.
