= Dennis Waterman (poker player) =

American poker player and writer (1948–2022)

- Nickname: Swami

World Series of Poker
- Bracelet: None
- Money finishes: 9
- Highest WSOP Main Event finish: 23rd, 2003

World Poker Tour
- Title: None
- Final table: None
- Money finishes: 4

Dennis Waterman (May 18, 1948 – July 11, 2022) was an American professional poker player and writer. He had over 30 years of poker experience with reported career winnings of $1,194,115 as of 2012.

Waterman became a chess master by the age of 16. He also played backgammon competitively.

In 2007, Waterman appeared in the Fox Sports Net poker tournament Poker Dome Challenge. Waterman won his preliminary and semi-final matches, earning a seat at the $1 million final table. He lost in heads-up play when his all in call with 10-7 suited failed to improve against his opponent's pocket nines.

In addition to his success at the tables, Waterman also wrote articles for such outlets as Pokernews.com. A Buddhist, Waterman also wrote several books on spirituality and taught meditation. His spiritual side earned him the nickname "Swami" at the tables.

Waterman lived with his wife Geewon in Sedona, Arizona. He died on July 11, 2022, at the age of 74.
