= Steve Badger (poker player) =

American poker player

World Series of Poker
- Bracelet: 1
- Money finish: 1
- Highest WSOP Main Event finish: None

Steve Badger is a former professional poker player and World Series of Poker bracelet winner. He also owned Playwinningpoker.com until he sold it to PokerStars in 2010.

== Career ==
Badger has had $300 buy-in tournament wins at the 1993 California State Lowball Championship and the 1995, 1997 and 1999 Legends of Poker Omaha championships.

In 1999, he won five Omaha tournaments: a $500/with rebuys buy-in tournament at the Commerce Casino's Los Angeles Poker Classic, two $100 buy-in tournaments at Hollywood Park Racetrack, the $1,000 Legends of Poker at the Bicycle Casino, and the $2,500 buy-in Omaha championship at the 1999 World Series of Poker.

In 2000, Badger established his PlayWinningPoker.com website, which included his Omaha, Texas hold 'em, and other poker strategy articles. At one time he was a columnist for Cardplayer Magazine.

As of 2013, his total live tournament winnings exceed $590,000, with 18 career wins and 90 tournament cashes.

== World Series of Poker bracelets ==
Year	Tournament	Prize (US$)
1999	$2,500 Omaha Hi-Low Split-8 or Better	$186,000
