= Speed poker =

Speed poker is a live variant of Texas hold 'em inspired by online poker. A relatively new variant, it is the format of two major televised tournaments, the World Speed Poker Open and the Poker Dome Challenge, as well as the Asia-Pacific Speed Poker Championship. Card Player credits Australian Keith Sloan with developing the speed poker variant. Although theoretically any poker variant could be played in a speed format, to date only Texas hold 'em has been widely played.

The Mansion Group subsequently purchased the rights to Sloan's concept Speed Poker, and have since developed and trademarked "Mansion Speed Poker."

Game play and hand rankings are identical to standard Texas hold 'em. The differences in rules mostly relate to the time players have to act on their hands. Each player has 15 seconds to act before his or her hand is ruled dead (or checked if there has been no previous action). Players are given one or more 30 second time extensions which they may use on any turn. In the Mansionpoker.net Poker Dome Challenge, pre-flop play is pot limit; post-flop play is no limit. In the World Speed Poker Open all play was no limit.
