= Jim Bechtel =

American poker player (born 1952)

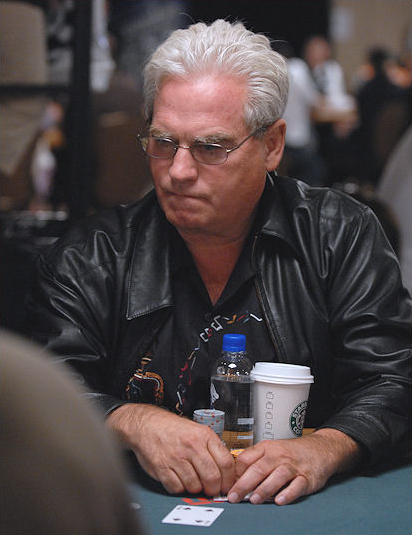
- Bechtel at the 2008 World Series of Poker $50,000 H.O.R.S.E. event
- Born: James Gary Bechtel; 1952 (age 73–74)

World Series of Poker
- Bracelets: 2
- Final tables: 10
- Money finishes: 25
- Highest WSOP Main Event finish: Winner, 1993

World Poker Tour
- Title: None
- Final table: None
- Money finishes: 4

James Gary Bechtel (born 1952) is an American cotton farmer and poker player, now based in Gilbert, Arizona. He is best known for winning the 1993 Main Event at the World Series of Poker (WSOP). At the time of his WSOP win, he lived in Coolidge, Arizona.

== Poker career ==
=== World Series of Poker ===
Bechtel began playing poker as a recreational player near his home in Arizona while working as a cotton farmer. He cashed for the first time in the World Series of Poker, coming close to winning a WSOP bracelet in 1979 when he finished runner-up to Perry Green in a $1,500 no limit Texas hold 'em event.

Bechtel followed up this showing with several more final table appearances at the WSOP tournaments. Bechtel first cashed in the $10,000 No-Limit Hold'em Main Event in 1986, finishing in 11th place. He made the final table of the Main Event in 1988, finishing in 6th place in the tournament which was won by Johnny Chan who earned his second consecutive world championship title. Bechtel earned $49,000 for his 6th-place finish.

At the 1993 WSOP Main Event, Bechtel reached the final table in second chip position with $631,000. He went on to eliminate the 1990 World Champion Mansour Matloubi and professional poker player John Bonetti. Bechtel then went on to defeat his final opponent, professional Glenn Cozen, who in the third hand of heads-up play raised all-in with a very short-stack of chips, Bechtel instantly called the bet, without first looking at his cards, which were J♠ 6♠ while Cozen only held the 7♦ 4♥, the five community cards dealt were 10♥ 3♥ 8♣ 2♣ 5♦ and since neither player's hand improved Bechtel won the title on the strength of the Jack-high alone. Bechtel earned the top prize of $1,000,000 and the WSOP bracelet, becoming the first amateur player to win the WSOP Main Event since Hal Fowler won the 1979 World Series of Poker Championship.

Bechtel also finished in the money of the Main Event in 1986 (11th), 1988 (6th), 1989 (31st), and 2001 (23rd).

Bechtel was also one of the players to make the final table of the inaugural $50,000 H.O.R.S.E. event of the 2006 World Series of Poker, which was won by the late Chip Reese. The players at the final table for this event were one of the most accomplished groups of poker players ever to sit at a WSOP final table. The table included two world champions, Bechtel himself and Doyle Brunson, WSOP bracelet winners T. J. Cloutier, Phil Ivey, Dewey Tomko, Chip Reese, as well as established professionals David Singer who has since won a bracelet, Patrik Antonius, and Andy Bloch, who finished runner-up in the tournament. Bechtel was eliminated after his pocket sevens were beaten by Bloch's pocket tens. Bechtel earned $549,120 for his fourth-place finish.

In 2009, Bechtel competed in the WSOP Champions Invitational tournament, open only to players who have won the $10,000 No Limit Hold'em Main Event at the World Series of Poker. The tournament drew 20 out of the 24 living former world champions, and the ten-handed final table was broadcast by ESPN. Bechtel finished fourth place in the tournament, which was won by 1983 World Champion Tom McEvoy.

In 2019, Bechtel won a No Limit 2-7 Lowball Draw for his first bracelet since his 1993 Main Event win. The 26 years between bracelet wins is the longest such span in WSOP history.

==== World Series of Poker bracelet ====
Year	Event	Prize ($US)
1993	$10,000 No Limit Hold'em World Championship	$1,000,000
2019	$10,000 No Limit 2-7 Lowball Draw	$253,817

=== World Poker Tour ===
Bechtel has competed on the World Poker Tour and has cashed in four tournaments. His highest cash was 10th place in the season two Five Diamond World Poker Classic, held at the Bellagio. He earned $34,917.

His other three cashes were at the season two Bicycle Casino Legends of Poker (15th place, earning $15,450), the season three WPT World Championship (69th place, earning $30,000), and the season four L. A. Poker Classic (35th place, earning $26,573). Bechtel has earned a total of $106,940 from his cashes on the WPT.

=== Other poker tournaments ===
Aside from the WSOP and WPT, Bechtel has made numerous cashes and has won two other major tournaments. His first major tournament victory was at the 1992 Hall of Fame Poker Classic, where he won the $5,000 buy-in No Limit Hold'em tournament, earning $214,000.

In 1994, he won the Queens Poker Classic IV $2,500 buy-in No Limit Deuce to Seven Draw event, earning a prize of $60,750. Since then, he has cashed in many different tournaments and made more than a dozen final table appearances. His most recent major tournament cash was 48th place (earning $4,139) in the 2010 Arizona Poker Championship $1,000 No Limit Hold'em event.

As of 2012, his total tournament winnings exceed $2,500,000. His 23 cashes at the WSOP account for $1,838,861 of those winnings.
