= Thomas Chung (artist) =

American painter

Thomas Chung (born 1988) is an American visual artist and assistant professor of art and painting based in Anchorage Alaska whose work deals mainly with topics of globalization and healing culture. He is best known for the controversy surrounding his painting “Everything” that includes a depiction of the severed head of Donald Trump being held by actor Chris Evans.

== Early life and education ==
Chung was born in New Jersey and grew up in New York and Hong Kong.

He received a bachelor of arts degree in 2010 from the San Francisco Art Institute in San Francisco, California. He studied at the Chelsea College of Art and Design in London. He received his master of fine art degree in 2013 from the Yale School of Art.

== Career ==
Chung participated in the 2012 group exhibition “Gifted and Talented” in Manhattan, New York, curated by performance artist Clifford Owens.

His work was featured on PBS in May 2019 for its series “Indie Alaska.”

He had a solo exhibit in 2018 at the Anchorage Museum titled “Everything is Sacred."

His work is in the permanent collection of the Anchorage Museum and appears in the book North-Finding Place in Alaska.

In 2020 Chung and University of Alaska paintings students created a stained-glass inspired mural in downtown Anchorage in partnership with the Anchorage Museum.

== Awards ==
- Chung was the recipient of a Rasmuson Foundation 2016 Project Award to create a series of 10 large-scale oil paintings.
- University-wide Theron Rockwell Field Prize for “poetic, literary, or religious scholarship,” Yale University

== "Everything" controversy ==
In response to the result of the 2016 US presidential election, Chung created the painting “Everything” to comment on the inseparability of racial inequity and American culture and history. The painting was displayed at the University of Alaska’s Kimura Gallery in April 2017 as part of a regularly scheduled faculty show. Images of the painting on the internet caused local TV stations to cover the story which then went national. The motif of nude actor Chris Evans holding the severed head of Donald Trump was covered by the Fox News television program America's Newsroom and featured on Fox News Insider, as well as other news media outlets such as The Associated Press. This resulted in threats to the artist, hate mail, and the need for a police escort. Shortly after the controversy began, University of Alaska Anchorage President Jim Johnsen issued a campus-wide statement in support of Professor Chung and free speech. "A vital and vibrant university, regardless of the campus, must be a place of ideas and debate," Johnsen wrote, "…a place where the most controversial ideas abound, and where assumptions and positions are openly tested."

The painting “Everything” and its related aftermath has been cited in news media about the limits of free speech. The subsequent controversial photo of comedian Kathy Griffin holding a fake severed head of Donald Trump has been linked to Chung’s painting in conversations about free speech.

== Personal life ==
Chung lives in North Anchorage.
