= Ron Rose =

American poker player (1944–2019)

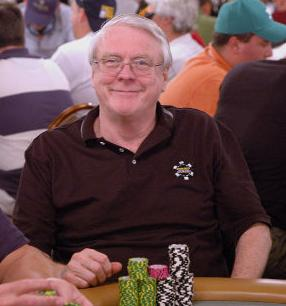
- Rose in the 2006 World Series of Poker.
- Born: Ronald Morris Rose; September 4, 1944; Vancouver, Washington, U.S.
- Died: October 24, 2019 (aged 75); Cincinnati, Ohio, U.S.

World Series of Poker
- Bracelet: 1
- Final tables: 2
- Money finishes: 4

World Poker Tour
- Title: 1 (+1)
- Final tables: 2 (+1)
- Money finishes: 2 (+1)

Ronald Morris Rose (September 4, 1944 – October 24, 2019) was an American poker player from Dayton, Ohio, and a two time World Poker Tour (WPT) Champion with a World Series of Poker bracelet.

== Early life and career ==
Rose was born in Vancouver, Washington. Prior to getting involved in the poker tournament circuit, Rose was a mathematician and project engineer in the Air Force. He was honorably discharged as a Captain in 1975, and later became an entrepreneur. He also held a seat on the American Stock Exchange and owned his own commodities firm.

== Poker ==
=== World Series of Poker ===
Rose, who has been playing poker since the age of six, first finished in the money of a World Series of Poker (WSOP) event in 2001 in the $1,500 pot limit omaha event. He went on to win a WSOP bracelet in the 2003 seniors' no limit hold'em event, defeating a field of 377 opponents to take home the $130,060 first prize.

Rose again played in the 2006 World Series of Poker – Senior's Event and made the final table trying to become the first senior to win the event twice, but came up short by finishing 6th at the final table out of a field of 1,184 opponents.

=== World Poker Tour ===
In November 2002 the first season of the World Poker Tour (WPT) Rose finished 6th at the World Poker Finals in Foxwood CT. In 2003, Rose went on to win the World Poker Challenge event in Reno Nv., by defeating a final table including Paul "X-22" Magriel and T. J. Cloutier.

However, Rose's biggest accomplishment was winning the inaugural WPT "Battle of Champions" event, which was televised on NBC in 2004 on Super Bowl Sunday. Rose defeated all the winners of the 1st year's WPT events including Howard Lederer and Gus Hansen.

=== Other poker events ===
Ron Rose's first major accomplishment was winning three different poker events (Pot limit hold'em, Omaha Hi and Omaha Hi-lo) in a single week at the Aviation Club in Paris, France in 2001. In addition, he also won the prestigious No-Limit hold'em tournament the last time he was in Paris in 2002. Rose then moved onto the United States Poker scene with a great deal of success.

Rose also made the final table of the first ever Professional Poker Tour (PPT) event, finishing in third place at Foxwood, Ct. in 2004.

In 2004, Rose's book Poker Aces: The Stars of Tournament Poker (ISBN 0-9749724-0-1) was released.

As of 2008, his total live tournament winnings exceed $1,000,000.

=== Death ===
Ron Rose died on October 24, 2019, in Cincinnati, Ohio, at the age of 75. He had been battling cancer for several years.
