= Eli Balas =

Professional poker player

- Nickname: None

World Series of Poker
- Bracelets: 3
- Money finishes: 24
- Highest WSOP Main Event finish: None

World Poker Tour
- Title: None
- Final table: None
- Money finishes: 2

Eli Balas is an Israeli professional poker player, based in Las Vegas, Nevada.

Balas has won three bracelets at the World Series of Poker (WSOP). He has also finished 2nd in 5 WSOP preliminary events.

Balas finished on the television bubble, which was seventh place, for the inaugural World Poker Tour (WPT) event and made two final tables of the Ultimate Poker Challenge.

As of 2008, his total live tournament winnings exceed $1,300,000. His 24 cashes at the WSOP account for $1,148,041 of those winnings.

== WSOP Bracelets ==
Year	Tournament	Prize (US$)
1992	$1,500 Omaha 8 or better	$122,400
1999	$5,000 Limit Hold'em	$220,000
2004	$2,500 Limit Hold'em	$174,440
