= Paul Darden =

American poker player (born 1968)

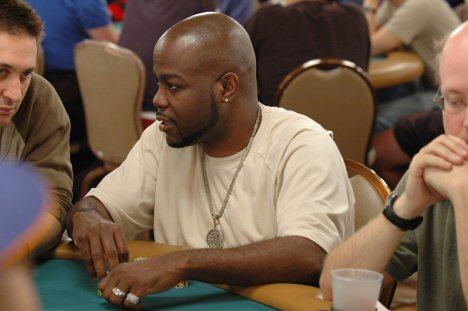
- Darden at the 2005 World Series of Poker
- Nickname: The Truth
- Born: October 27, 1968 (age 58)

World Series of Poker
- Bracelet: 1
- Money finishes: 16
- Highest WSOP Main Event finish: 45th, 2003

World Poker Tour
- Title: 1
- Final tables: 2
- Money finishes: 6

Paul Darden, Jr. (born October 27, 1968) is an American professional poker player, rap music promoter, and night club owner from New Haven, Connecticut.

== Early years ==
He was accused of murder at the age of 15, due to mistaken identity but was acquitted. Poker was Darden's way of turning his life around, and he was helped in this by his mentor, Phil Ivey.

== Poker career ==
Originally, Darden was best known as a seven-card stud player, in which he had several notable tournament finishes in 2000 prior to winning the World Series of Poker (WSOP) bracelet in 2001 for the $2,500 seven-card stud event, defeating Tom Franklin heads-up.

In 2002, Darden won a World Poker Tour (WPT) title in the $3,000 main event of the Gold Rush tournament. He later finished in second place behind Gus Hansen in the WPT Bad Boys of Poker invitational event. Additionally, in March 2005 Darden finished fifth in the $10,000 main event of the PartyPoker.com Million IV cruise.

In 2003, Darden made his first money finish in the $10,000 WSOP main event, being eliminated in 45th place. He cashed in the same event in 2005.

Darden is also the mentor of professional poker player Amnon Filippi.

As of 2017, Darden's total live tournament winnings exceed $2,200,000.
