= Alan Goehring =

American poker player (born 1962)

- Born: February 21, 1962 (age 64)

World Series of Poker
- Bracelet: 1
- Money finishes: 15
- Highest WSOP Main Event finish: 2nd, 1999

World Poker Tour
- Titles: 2
- Final tables: 3
- Money finishes: 16

Alan Goehring (born February 21, 1962) is an American retired junk bond analyst and trader from Henderson, Nevada. At the age of 37, he became a professional poker player.

Goehring first made his mark on the poker circuit when he finished in 3rd place in the $3,000 No Limit Hold-Em event at the 1997 World Series of Poker (WSOP). He won $61,845 in the tournament, which was won by Max Stern and also featured Kathy Liebert, Chris Ferguson, Donnacha O'Dea, and Dan Harrington.

In 1999, Goehring finished runner-up in the 363-player field, WSOP $10,000 No Limit Hold'em Main Event to Noel Furlong. He won $768,625 for his efforts.

Goehring eventually overcame this status by winning the World Poker Tour (WPT) $25,000 season 1 championship, overcoming Russian player Kirill Gerasimov in the eventual heads-up confrontation to take home a $1,011,886 grand prize. The final table also included Phil Ivey, Doyle Brunson and Ted Forrest.

Goehring made two final tables in the WPT's 4th season. He finished 6th at the 2005 WPT €10,000 Grand Prix de Paris, eventually won by Roland De Wolfe. He went on to win the LA Poker Classic later in the season, winning a then-WPT record-breaking $2,391,550. In the 2020 WSOP Online, he won his first bracelet in a $500 No Limit Hold'em Freezout tournament.

As of 2023, his total live tournament winnings exceed $5,300,000. His 6 cashes at the WSOP account for $851,575 of those winnings.

== World Series of Poker bracelets ==
Year	Tournament	Prize (US$)
2020 O	$500 No Limit Hold'em Freezeout	$119,399

An "O" following a year denotes bracelet(s) won during the World Series of Poker Online
