= Amnon Filippi =

American poker player (born 1969)

- Nickname: Guts
- Born: June 29, 1969 (age 57)

World Series of Poker
- Bracelet: None
- Money finishes: 9
- Highest WSOP Main Event finish: 498th, 2007

World Poker Tour
- Title: None
- Final tables: 3
- Money finishes: 8

Amnon Eric Filippi (born June 29, 1969) is a professional poker player based in New York City.

Filippi's significant achievement to date was his first-place finish in the 2005 $10,000 No Limit Texas hold 'em Bellagio Challenge Cup poker tournament held at the Bellagio in Las Vegas, Nevada, from July 18, 2005, through July 21, 2005. Filippi made the final of the World Poker Tour (WPT) 2006 Borgata Winter Open, held at the Borgata in Atlantic City, New Jersey, from January 29 through February 1, 2006, placing fourth for $184,785.

In December 2008, During Season VII of the WPT Filippi made the final table of the Doyle Brunson Five Diamond World Poker Classic and finished in 5th place, earning $288,235.

Amnon also appeared on season two of GSN’s High Stakes Poker, and in the 2007 World Series of Poker - Poker Players' Championship, World Championship H.O.R.S.E. Filippi was chip leader for a significant portion of the game beginning on Day 5 of the tournament. finally finishing in fourth place, winning $586,080.

As of 2023, Filippi's total live tournament winnings exceed $3,700,000. His 61 cashes at the WSOP account for $1,465,469 of those winnings.
