= Phil Hellmuth =

American poker player (born 1964)

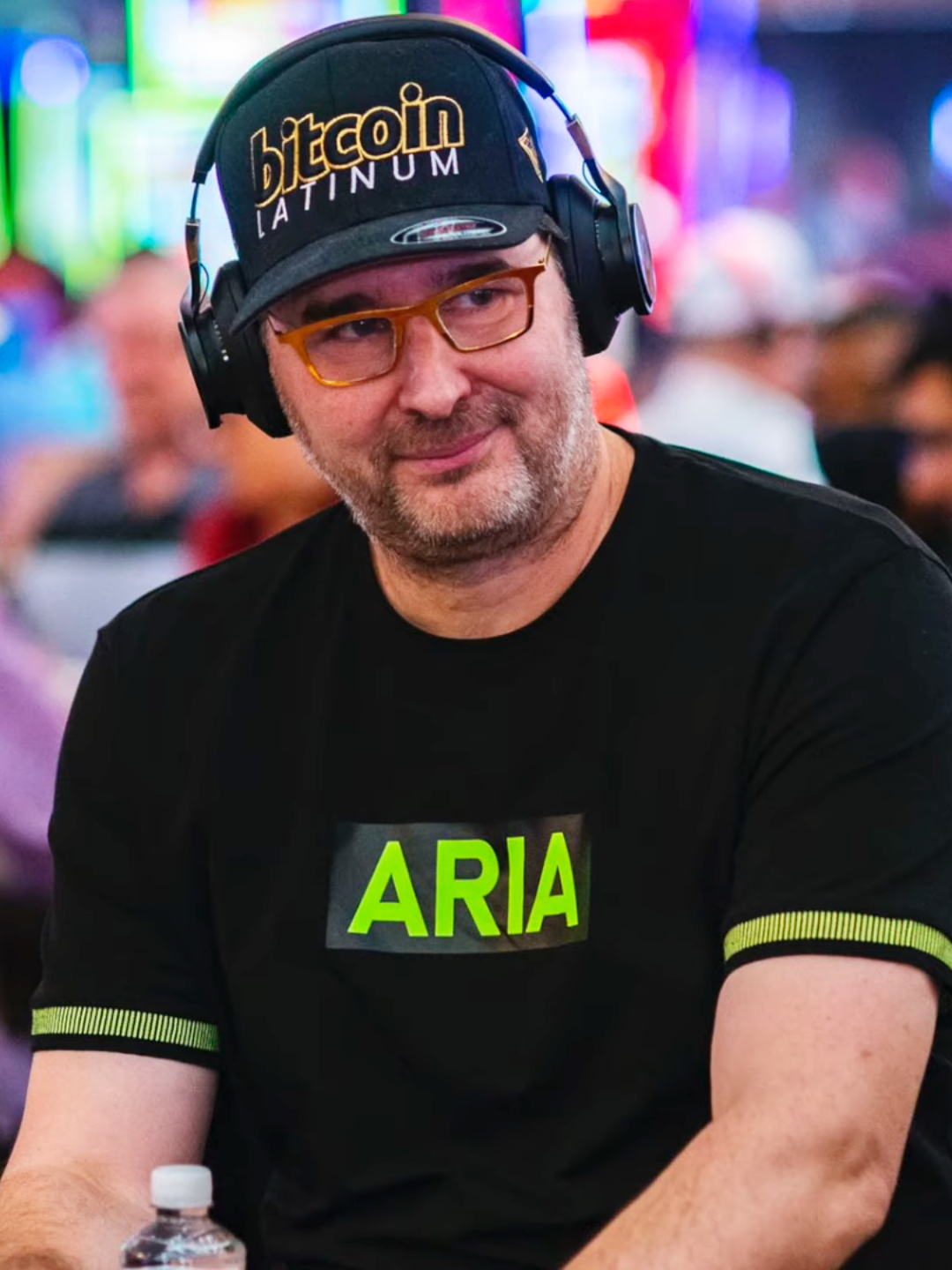
- Hellmuth during the WPT Venetian 2021
- Nicknames: The Poker Brat; Lumestackin
- Born: Phillip Jerome Hellmuth Jr. July 16, 1964 (age 62); Madison, Wisconsin, U.S.

World Series of Poker
- Bracelets: 17
- Money finishes: 210
- Highest WSOP Main Event finish: Winner, 1989

World Poker Tour
- Title: None
- Final tables: 5
- Money finishes: 18

Phillip Jerome Hellmuth Jr. (born July 16, 1964) is an American professional poker player who has won a record seventeen World Series of Poker bracelets, the majority in no-limit hold'em. He is the winner of the Main Event of the 1989 World Series of Poker (WSOP) and the Main Event of the 2012 World Series of Poker Europe (WSOPE), and he is a 2007 inductee of the WSOP's Poker Hall of Fame. He is the only player in poker history to have won a WSOP bracelet in 5 different decades. He is widely regarded as one of the greatest tournament players in history.

== Personal life ==
Hellmuth was born in Madison, Wisconsin, and attended Madison West High School. He had trouble with grades and friends during school and said at the time he was the "ugly duckling" of his family. He moved on to the University of Wisconsin–Madison for three years, where he dropped out to become a full-time poker player.

Since 1992, he has lived in Palo Alto, California, with his wife, Katherine Sanborn, who is a psychiatrist at Stanford University, and their two sons, Phillip III and Nicholas.

Hellmuth is a Golden State Warriors fan and has attended many Warriors games with team owner Joe Lacob.

== Poker career ==
Hellmuth is known to prefer taking his seat at poker tournaments long after they begin.

As of December 2024, his live tournament winnings exceed $30,000,000.

=== World Series of Poker ===
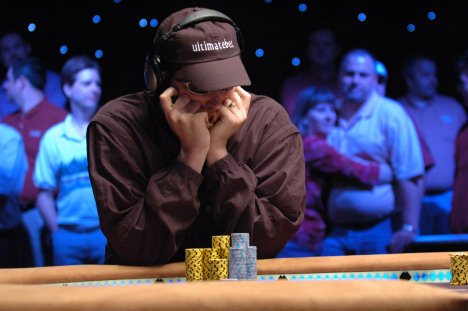
Phil Hellmuth at the 2006 World Series of Poker.

In the 1988 World Series of Poker, Hellmuth had his first in-the-money finish at the $1,500 Seven Card Stud Split, a fifth-place finish. In the 1988 WSOP Main Event, he came in 33rd after being eliminated by eventual champion Johnny Chan.

In 1989, the 24-year-old Hellmuth became the youngest player to win the Main Event of the WSOP by defeating the two-time defending champion Johnny Chan in heads-up play; Hellmuth's record was broken by Peter Eastgate (22) in 2008.

As of September 2020, Hellmuth had won over $15,000,000 at the WSOP and ranked fourth on the WSOP All Time Money List, behind Antonio Esfandiari, Daniel Colman, and Daniel Negreanu. Hellmuth also was fifth all time in number of times cashed in the WSOP Main Event with eight (1988, 1989, 1997, 2001, 2003, 2008, 2009, and 2015), placing him behind Berry Johnston (ten), and Humberto Brenes, Doyle Brunson, and Bobby Baldwin (nine).

Fourteen of Hellmuth's 17 bracelets have been in Texas hold'em, though he has had some success in non-hold'em events. As of the start of the 2015 World Series, 22 of Hellmuth's 52 final tables are for a variety of games, including 2–7 Lowball, Seven Card Stud Hi-Lo, Seven Card Razz, and Omaha hold'em (Pot Limit, Limit, and Hi-Lo), as well as mixed games like H.O.R.S.E and the $50,000 Poker Player's Championship; his first-ever WSOP final table (and first-ever WSOP cash) was in Seven Card Stud Hi-Lo in 1988, and his second-ever WSOP final table (and third-ever WSOP cash) was in Pot Limit Omaha hold'em w/Rebuys in 1989. His third-ever WSOP final table (and fifth-ever WSOP cash) was his Main Event victory in 1989.) Of those 22 events, Hellmuth has finished runner-up six times.

World Series of Poker braceletsAn "E" following a year denotes bracelet(s) won at the World Series of Poker Europe
Year	Tournament	Prize (US$/EU€)
1989	$10,000 No Limit Hold'em World Championship	$755,000
1992	$5,000 Limit Hold'em	$168,000
1993	$1,500 No Limit Hold'em	$161,400
1993	$2,500 No Limit Hold'em	$173,000
1993	$5,000 Limit Hold'em	$138,000
1997	$3,000 Pot Limit Hold'em	$204,000
2001	$2,000 No Limit Hold'em	$316,550
2003	$2,500 Limit Hold'em	$171,400
2003	$3,000 No Limit Hold'em	$410,860
2006	$1,000 No Limit Hold'em with rebuys	$631,863
2007	$1,500 No Limit Hold'em	$637,254
2012	$2,500 Seven-Card Razz	$182,793
2012E	€10,450 No Limit Hold'em Main Event	€1,022,376
2015	$10,000 Seven-Card Razz	$271,105
2018	$5,000 No Limit Hold'em	$485,082
2021	$1,500 No Limit 2–7 Lowball Draw	$84,851
2023	$10,000 Super Turbo Bounty No-Limit Hold'em	$803,818

At the 1993 World Series of Poker, Hellmuth became the second player in WSOP history to win three bracelets in one WSOP. (Walter "Puggy" Pearson was the first to do so in 1973; one of those bracelets was for winning the Main Event.) Hellmuth's three victories came in three consecutive days. (Ted Forrest also won three bracelets in three consecutive days at the 1993 WSOP to become the third player to win three bracelets in one WSOP.)

At the 1997 World Series of Poker, Hellmuth won his 5th bracelet of the decade, the most of any player in the 1990s.

At the 2006 World Series of Poker, Hellmuth captured his 10th World Series of Poker bracelet in the $1,000 No Limit Hold'em with rebuys event. At the time, it tied him with Doyle Brunson and Johnny Chan for most bracelets. At the 2007 World Series of Poker, Hellmuth won his record-breaking 11th bracelet in the $1,500 No Limit Hold'em Event.

Hellmuth's sponsor arranged for him to arrive at the 2007 WSOP Main Event in a race car. Hellmuth lost control of the car in the Rio All Suite Hotel and Casino parking lot and hit a light fixture. He gave up the car for a limo, arriving at the Main Event two hours late.

At the 2008 WSOP Main Event, Hellmuth verbally abused another player and received a one-round penalty. After a private meeting with WSOP Commissioner Jeffrey Pollack, the penalty was overruled, and Hellmuth finished the tournament in 45th place.

In the 2011 World Series of Poker, Phil finished second in three tournaments, in the 2–7 Draw Lowball Championship, the Seven Card Stud Hi-Low Split-8 or Better Championship, and The Poker Player's Championship eight-game mix.

On June 11, 2012, Hellmuth won his 12th World Series of Poker bracelet in the $2,500 Seven-Card Razz event, defeating Don Zewin and earning $182,793. Zewin had finished third to Chan and Hellmuth when Hellmuth won his first bracelet in 1989. This is the first bracelet Hellmuth has won in a non-hold'em event, and made him the first player to win at least one bracelet in each of the last four decades, and only the third player in WSOP history to win a bracelet in four decades (Jay Heimowitz won 6 bracelets, spanning the 1970s through the 2000s, and Billy Baxter won 7 bracelets, also spanning the 1970s through the 2000s). Hellmuth also collected $2,645,333 for his fourth-place finish in the $1,000,000 buy-in "Big One for One Drop" tournament, by far the largest single tournament cash of his career.

On October 4, 2012, Hellmuth won his 13th World Series of Poker bracelet in the €10,450 WSOPE No Limit Hold'em Main Event, earning €1,022,376 ($1,333,841) and becoming the first player to ever win both the WSOP and WSOPE Main Events. This win also made Hellmuth the first player in WSOP history to win multiple bracelets in three decades (1993 (3), 2003 (2), and 2012 (2)). Also, Hellmuth finished runner-up in the WSOP Player of the Year race for a record third time (2006, 2011, and 2012).

On June 8, 2015, Hellmuth won his 14th World Series of Poker bracelet in the $10,000 Seven-Card Razz event, earning $271,105.

On July 11, 2018, Hellmuth won his 15th World Series of Poker bracelet in the $5,000 No-Limit Hold'em event, earning $485,082.

On October 17, 2021, Hellmuth won his 16th World Series of Poker bracelet in the $1,500 No-Limit 2–7 Lowball Draw event, earning $84,851. With this victory, Hellmuth became the first player to win bracelets in five different decades.

On July 2, 2023, Hellmuth won his 17th World Series of Poker bracelet in the $10,000 Super Turbo Bounty No-Limit Hold'em event, earning $803,818.

=== World Poker Tour ===
Hellmuth has cashed 19 times, made five final tables, and earned over $1.5 million on the World Poker Tour. He finished in fourth place in the $3,000 No Limit Hold'em WPT Event at the 49'er Gold Rush Bonanza in 2002, in third place in the $10,000 No Limit Hold'em Event at the World Poker Finals at Foxwoods in 2003, in sixth place at the 2008 L.A. Poker Classic, in sixth place at the Bay 101 Shooting Star event in 2010, and second place in 2017 at the Bicycle Casino. In 2010. he was the television bubble boy finishing seventh at the $25,000 WPT World Championship.

=== Other notable tournaments ===
Hellmuth makes regular appearances on episodes of Poker After Dark on PokerGO both as a player and as a drop-in commentator. Hellmuth won his first Poker After Dark tournament in the first episode of the third season, winning $120,000. Hellmuth returned two weeks later and claimed his second Poker After Dark title, winning another $120,000. Hellmuth is the Season 3 champion of Late Night Poker.

In 2000, he won the Poker EM 7-Card Stud Main Event in Austria. Phil defeated 437 other players to win $106,250. In 2005, Hellmuth won the first NBC National Heads-Up Poker Championship. He defeated Men Nguyen, Paul Phillips, Huck Seed, Lyle Berman and Antonio Esfandiari on the way to the final against Chris Ferguson whom he defeated in two out of three games. While trying to repeat in 2006, he lost in the first round to Chip Reese. In 2007, Hellmuth did not play due to the PartyPoker.com Premier League Poker, a British tournament in which he took part. He won four out of his six group matches and eventually finished third in the finals. Hellmuth took part in the 2008 National Heads-Up Poker Championship, losing in the first round to Tom Dwan. In 2013, Hellmuth finished in second place, losing to Mike Matusow in the final round and earning $300,000.

In July 2020, PokerGO announced a new series called High Stakes Duel which would follow a heads-up format of poker with the stakes doubling every round and the loser of the match having the first option to challenge for a rematch. Hellmuth would face Antonio Esfandiari in Round 1 on July 31, 2020, with the buy-in for each player being $50,000. Hellmuth defeated Esfandiari, and Esfandiari immediately declared his intention for a rematch. Round 2 was held on September 24, 2020, and would see each player buy-in for $100,000. Hellmuth again defeated Esfandiari, and Round 3 would be set for October 21, 2020, when Esfandiari immediately challenged for a rematch after the loss. Round 3 saw the buy-in doubled to $200,000, and Hellmuth defeated Esfandiari for the third consecutive time. Following the unique rules of High Stakes Duel, Esfandiari was out of challenges and Hellmuth could cash out his $400,000 in winnings or progress through to Round 4. Hellmuth decided to cash out the $400,000 and announced in his winner's interview that he will be ready for Season 2.

In 2021, Phil Hellmuth challenged Daniel Negreanu in High Stakes Duel II. The two played three rounds, and Hellmuth won all three and cashed out his $400,000. Following that victory, he returned for High Stakes Duel III. In round 1, he faced challenger Nick Wright of Fox Sports and won $100,000. His seven-game winning streak came to an end after Tom Dwan challenged him in round 2 and defeated him for $200,000. Phil Hellmuth defeated Dwan in round 3 for $400,000.

== Other activities ==
Hellmuth appeared in GSN's and PokerGo's cash game show, High Stakes Poker. He was involved with creating the software for UltimateBet and was formerly a member of Team UB.

Hellmuth has made several instructional poker videos, including his Ultimate White To Black Belt Course and Phil Hellmuth's Million Dollar Poker System. He has written for Cardplayer magazine and authored several poker books including Play Poker like the Pros, Bad Beats and Lucky Draws, The Greatest Poker Hands ever Played, and Poker Brat. In May 2004 he partnered with Oasys Mobile to create a mobile app called Texas Hold'em by Phil Hellmuth. In spring 2006, Hellmuth replaced Phil Gordon as commentator on Bravo's Celebrity Poker Showdown. Hellmuth was a poker coach on Fox Sports Network's Best Damn Poker Show.

In 2009, Hellmuth's publishing company, Phil's House Publishing, published the Stephen John and Marvin Karlins book Deal Me In: 20 Of The World's Top Poker Players Share The Heartbreaking and Inspiring Stories of How They Turned Pro.

== Personality and controversy ==
Hellmuth is known for his "Poker Brat" personality, especially after taking bad beats. In the first week of Poker After Dark on NBC, Hellmuth asked fellow pros Shawn Sheikhan, Steve Zolotow, Gus Hansen and Huck Seed to stop talking while it was his turn to act on his hand after Annie Duke raised him. They initially complied, but when Hellmuth began to talk, he was mocked by Seed, who said, "please be quiet so I can talk," eliciting laughter from the other players. Hellmuth then threatened never to play on the show again and walked off the set. After the show's producers intervened, Hellmuth returned and was eliminated a few hands later by Sheikhan. Duke remained quiet while the drama played out, though in a later interview, she described Hellmuth's behavior as "one of the biggest overreactions I have ever seen."

On Day 5 of the 2008 WSOP Main Event, Hellmuth folded A♠ K♥ to Cristian Dragomir's bet on a flop of 9♣ 10♣ 7♠. Asked by the table to show his hand, Dragomir revealed that he had called Hellmuth's pre-flop re-raise with 10♦ 4♦, a much weaker hand. Hellmuth proceeded to call Dragomir an "idiot," among other insults, and was eventually issued a warning by the floorperson for continued berating of another player. Other players, including his friend Mike Matusow, advised him to stop. Nonetheless, he continued to verbally abuse Dragomir until he received a one-round penalty. The penalty was to be carried out at the beginning of play the next day. After Hellmuth had a private meeting with WSOP Commissioner Jeffrey Pollack, Pollack overruled the floorperson's penalty.

== Bibliography ==
- #POSITIVITY: You Are Always In The Right Place At The Right Time (2017) ISBN 193654900X
- Phil Hellmuth's Texas Hold 'Em (2005) ISBN 0-06-083460-9
- Bad Beats and Lucky Draws: Poker Strategies, Winning Hands, and Stories from the Professional Poker Tour (2004) ISBN 0-06-074083-3
- Play Poker Like the Pros (2003) ISBN 0-06-000572-6
