= 2005 World Series of Poker results =

This list of 2005 World Series of Poker (WSOP) results includes statistics, final table results and payouts.

== Results ==
=== Event 1: $500 Casino Employee's No Limit Hold'em ===
June 2, 2005

This event kicked off the 2005 WSOP. It was a $500 buy-in no limit Texas hold 'em tournament reserved for casino employees that work in Nevada.

- Number of buy-ins: 662
- Total Prize Pool: $297,900
- Number of Payouts: 63

Final Table
Place	Name	Prize
1st	Andy Nguyen	$83,390
2nd	Danilo Flores	$43,195
3rd	Thang Luu	$23,830
4th	Simon Matthews	$20,855
5th	Steven Cuti	$17,875
6th	Dustin West	$14,895
7th	Todd Dakake	$11,915
8th	David Slowik	$8,935
9th	Justin Porter	$5,960

=== Event 2: $1,500 No-Limit Texas Hold'em ===
June 3, 2005

- Number of buy-ins: 2,305
- Total Prize Pool: $3,180,900
- Number of Payouts: 200

Final Table
Place	Name	Prize
1st	Allen Cunningham	$725,405
2nd	Scott Fischman	$352,125
3rd	Dave Ulliott	$232,205
4th	Can Kim Hua	$200,395
5th	Liz Lieu	$177,000
6th	Charlie Huff	$136,780
7th	An Tran	$104,970
8th	Randy Edmonson	$73,160
9th	Richard Boutwell	$54,075

=== Event 3: $1,500 Pot-Limit Hold'em ===
June 4, 2005

- Number of buy-ins: 1,071
- Total Prize Pool: $1,477,980
- Number of Payouts: 100

Final Table
Place	Name	Prize
1st	Thomas Werthmann	$369,535
2nd	Layne Flack	$185,855
3rd	Tony Ma	$118,240
4th	Martin Green	$103,460
5th	David Bach	$88,680
6th	Mario Valenzuela	$73,900
7th	Pierre Nasr	$59,120
8th	Arash Ganehian	$44,340
9th	Ernest Patrick	$29,560

=== Event 4: $1,500 Limit Hold 'em ===
June 5, 2005

- Number of buy-ins: 1,049
- Total Prize Pool: $1,447,620
- Number of Payouts: 100

Final Table
Place	Name	Prize
1st	Eric Froehlich	$361,910
2nd	Jason Steinhorn	$182,040
3rd	Todd Witteles	$115,810
4th	Adam Hersh	$101,335
5th	Christian Van Hees	$86,855
6th	Devin Armstrong	$72,380
7th	Peter Costa	$57,905
8th	Wing Wong	$43,430
9th	Brian Mogelefsky	$28,950

=== Event 5: $1,500 Omaha High-Low 8/OB ===
June 6, 2005

- Number of buy-ins: 699
- Total Prize Pool: $964,620
- Number of Payouts: 63

Final Table
Place	Name	Prize
1st	Pat Poels	$270,100
2nd	John Lukas	$139,870
3rd	Jeff Duvall	$77,170
4th	Bahram Kianfar	$67,525
5th	Dan Heimiller	$57,875
6th	Jim Meehan	$48,230
7th	Darrell Dicken	$38,585
8th	Boris Shats	$28,940
9th	Minh Nguyen	$19,290

=== Event 6: $2,500 No-Limit Hold'em (Six-Handed) ===
June 7, 2005

- Number of buy-ins: 548
- Total Prize Pool: $1,260,400
- Number of Payouts: 66

Final Table
Place	Name	Prize
1st	Isaac Galazan	$315,125
2nd	Harry Demetriou	$163,850
3rd	Tommy Grimes	$85,705
4th	David Singer	$75,625
5th	Antonio Esfandiari	$63,020
6th	Anthony Esposito	$52,250

=== Event 7: $1,000 No-limit Hold'em w/Rebuys ===
June 8, 2005

- Number of buy-ins: 826
- Number of rebuys: 1,495
- Total Prize Pool: $2,201,630
- Number of Payouts: 72

Final Table
Place	Name	Prize
1st	Michael Gracz	$594,460
2nd	Cheung Tai Law	$311,555
3rd	Chuck Thompson	$176,145
4th	David Pham	$154,125
5th	Shane Schleger	$132,110
6th	Shae Drobushevich	$110,090
7th	Pascal Perrault	$88,070
8th	Phil Gordon	$66,055
9th	Meng La	$44,035

=== Event 8: $1,500 Seven Card Stud ===
June 9, 2005

- Number of buy-ins: 472
- Total Prize Pool: $651,360
- Number of Payouts: 40

Final Table
Place	Name	Prize
1st	Cliff Josephy	$192,150
2nd	Kirill Gerasimov	$108,775
3rd	Mark Burtman	$63,180
4th	Greg Mascio	$48,200
5th	Ibrahim Almalhi	$39,735
6th	Ardell Willis	$31,265
7th	Minh Nguyen	$24,750
8th	Murry Reinhart	$17,585

=== Event 9: $2,000 No Limit Hold'em ===
June 10, 2005

- Number of buy-ins: 1403
- Total Prize Pool: $2,581,520
- Number of Payouts: 140

Final Table
Place	Name	Prize
1st	Erik Seidel	$611,795
2nd	Cyndy Violette	$295,970
3rd	Perry Friedman	$196,455
4th	Morgan Machina	$170,380
5th	Paul Sexton	$147,145
6th	Harry Demetriou	$123,915
7th	Fabrice Soulier	$103,260
8th	Chris Wunderlich	$77,445
9th	William Blanda	$51,630

=== Event 10: $2,000 Limit Hold'em ===
June 11, 2005

- Number of buy-ins: 569
- Total Prize Pool: $1,046,940
- Number of Payouts: 54

Final Table
Place	Name	Prize
1st	Reza Payvar	$303,610
2nd	Toto Leonidas	$160,185
3rd	John Myung	$83,755
4th	John Cernuto	$73,285
5th	Tommy Garza	$62,820
6th	Rodeen Talebi	$52,350
7th	Jay Helfert	$41,880
8th	Robert Schulze	$31,410
9th	Eric Liebeler	$20,940

=== Event 11: $2,000 Pot Limit Hold'em ===
June 12, 2005

- Number of buy-ins: 540
- Total Prize Pool: $993,600
- Number of Payouts: 45

Final Table
Place	Name	Prize
1st	Edward Moncada	$298,070
2nd	Steven Hudak	$159,970
3rd	David Cossio	$79,490
4th	Shah Ajay	$69,550
5th	Freddy Deeb	$59,615
6th	Sharbel Koumi	$49,680
7th	Marco Traniello	$39,745
8th	Elia Ahmadian	$29,810
9th	Yoshitaka Oku	$19,870

=== Event 12: $2,000 Pot Limit Omaha w/Rebuys ===
June 13, 2005

- Number of buy-ins: 212
- Number of rebuys: 395
- Total Prize Pool: $1,156,350
- Number of Payouts: 18

Final Table
Place	Name	Prize
1st	Josh Arieh	$381,600
2nd	Chris Ferguson	$210,460
3rd	Ronald Graham	$115,640
4th	Tony Seunson	$92,510
5th	Max Pescatori	$69,385
6th	Arturo Diaz	$57,820
7th	Dave Colclough	$46,225
8th	Doug Lee	$34,690
9th	Erik Seidel	$23,130

=== Event 13: $5,000 No-Limit Hold'em ===
June 14, 2005

- Number of buy-ins: 466
- Total Prize Pool: $2,190,200
- Number of Payouts: 45

Final Table
Place	Name	Prize
1st	T. J. Cloutier	$657,100
2nd	Steven Zoine	$352,620
3rd	John Bonetti	$175,215
4th	Neal Wang	$153,315
5th	Jason Berilgen	$131,410
6th	John Hennigan	$109,510
7th	Dustin Woolf	$87,610
8th	Todd Brunson	$65,705
9th	Tony Ma	$43,805

=== Event 14: $1000 Seven Card Stud High-Low 8/OB ===
June 15, 2005

- Number of buy-ins: 595
- Total Prize Pool: $541,450
- Number of Payouts: 48

Final Table
Place	Name	Prize
1st	Steve Hohn	$156,985
2nd	Mike Wattel	$88,800
3rd	Al Ruck	$51,440
4th	Jonathan Paul	$39,525
5th	Peter Phillips	$32,485
6th	Marie St. Michael	$25,450
7th	Men Nguyen	$20,035
8th	Giacomo D’Agostino	$14,080
9th	Russ Salzer	$8,665

=== Event 15: $1,500 Limit Hold'em Shootout ===
June 16, 2005

- Number of buy-ins: 450
- Total Prize Pool: $621,000
- Number of Payouts: 45

Final Table
Place	Name	Prize
1st	Mark Seif	$181,330
2nd	William Shaw	$93,770
3rd	Alex Borteh	$46,885
4th	Robert Mizrachi	$40,675
5th	Quinn Do	$34,460
6th	Aram Zeroumian	$28,255
7th	Kathy Liebert	$24,840
8th	Sam Siharath	$18,630
9th	M.J Partin	$12,420

=== Event 16: $1,500 No Limit Hold'em Shootout ===
June 17, 2005

- Number of buy-ins: 780
- Total Prize Pool: $1,076,400
- Number of Payouts: 78

Final Table
Place	Name	Prize
1st	Anthony Reategui	$269,100
2nd	Paul Kroh	$146,380
3rd	Phil Gordon	$75,350
4th	Young Phan	$64,585
5th	Kenny Robbins	$53,820
6th	Ted Lawson	$43,055
7th	Dariush Imani	$32,290
8th	Allen Goldstein	$25,835
9th	Erick Lindgren	$20,450
10th	Keith Quilty	$16,145

=== Event 17: $2,500 Limit Hold'em ===
June 18, 2005

- Number of buy-ins: 373
- Total Prize Pool: $857,900
- Number of Payouts: 36

Final Table
Place	Name	Prize
1st	Quinn Do	$265,975
2nd	Chi Chang	$137,265
3rd	Mike Davis	$68,630
4th	Tony Nasr	$60,055
5th	Tom Franklin	$51,475
6th	Sam Arzoin	$42,895
7th	Rodeen Talebi	$34,315
8th	Spencer Sun	$25,735
9th	Noah Boeken	$17,160

=== Event 18: $1,500 Pot Limit Omaha ===
June 19, 2005

- Number of buy-ins: 291
- Total Prize Pool: $404,710
- Number of Payouts: 27

Final Table
Place	Name	Prize
1st	Barry Greenstein	$128,505
2nd	Paul Vinci	$70,680
3rd	Chris Lindenmayer	$36,140
4th	Toto Leonidas	$28,110
5th	Tim Martz	$24,095
6th	Paul Maxfield	$20,080
7th	Chris Ferguson	$16,065
8th	Sam Silverman	$12,045
9th	Eric Bloore	$8,030

=== Event 19: $2,000 Seven Card Stud High-Low 8/OB ===
June 19, 2005

- Number of buy-ins: 279
- Total Prize Pool: $513,360
- Number of Payouts: 24

Final Table
Place	Name	Prize
1st	Denis Ethier	$160,685
2nd	Chad Brown	$89,838
3rd	Jennifer Harman	$53,903
4th	Tim Fu	$38,502
5th	Lance Edelman	$31,828
6th	Bonnie Rossi	$25,155
7th	Phillip Penn	$20,021
8th	Tom McCormick	$14,374

=== Event 20: $5,000 Pot-Limit Hold'em ===
June 20, 2005

- Number of buy-ins: 239
- Total Prize Pool: $1,123,300
- Number of Payouts: 18

Final Table
Place	Name	Prize
1st	Brian Wilson	$370,685
2nd	John Gale	$204,440
3rd	Derek Leforte	$112,330
4th	Allen Cunningham	$89,865
5th	Tony Cousineau	$67,400
6th	Steven Liu	$56,165
7th	Cyndy Violette	$44,930
8th	Joe Sebok	$33,700
9th	Burt Boutin	$22,645

=== Event 21: $2500 Omaha High-Low 8/OB ===
June 21, 2005

- Number of buy-ins: 359
- Total Prize Pool: $825,700
- Number of Payouts: 36

Final Table
Place	Name	Prize
1st	Todd Brunson	$255,945
2nd	Allen Kessler	$132,110
3rd	Tommy Fischer	$66,055
4th	Manelic Minaya	$57,800
5th	Larry Reynolds	$49,540
6th	Allyn Jaffrey Shulman	$41,285
7th	Glenn Cozen	$33,030
8th	Ben Lang	$24,770
9th	Nat Koe	$16,515

=== Event 22: $1,500 No-Limit Hold'em ===
June 24, 2005

- Number of buy-ins: 2,013
- Total Prize Pool: $2,777,940
- Number of Payouts: 200

Final Table
Place	Name	Prize
1st	Mark Seif	$611,145
2nd	Minh Nguyen	$329,975
3rd	Bill Gazes	$202,790
4th	Webber Kang	$175,010
5th	Peter Lee	$147,230
6th	Greg Raymer	$119,450
7th	James Carter	$91,670
8th	Steve Rassi	$63,895
9th	Dave Ulliott	$47,225

=== Event 23: $5,000 Seven-Card Stud ===
June 25, 2005

- Number of buy-ins: 192
- Total Prize Pool: $902,400
- Number of Payouts: 16

Final Table
Place	Name	Prize
1st	Jan Vang Sørensen	$293,275
2nd	Keith Sexton	$162,430
3rd	Chip Jett	$99,265
4th	John Phan	$72,190
5th	Joe Awada	$58,655
6th	Steven Diano	$45,120
7th	Gerard Rechnitzer	$36,095
8th	Tom McCormick	$27,070

=== Event 24: $2,500 No-Limit Hold'em ===
June 24, 2005

- Number of buy-ins: 1,056
- Total Prize Pool: $2,428,800
- Number of Payouts: 100

Final Table
Place	Name	Prize
1st	Farzad Bonyadi	$594,960
2nd	Lars Bonding	$317,625
3rd	Glynn Beebe	$194,305
4th	Robert Doyle	$170,015
5th	Mayen Grigorian	$145,730
6th	Joe Zappia	$121,440
7th	Jason Tate	$97,150
8th	K.J. Jordan	$72,865
9th	Larry Watson	$48,575

=== Event 25: $2,500 Pot Limit Hold'em ===
June 25, 2005

- Number of buy-ins: 425
- Total Prize Pool: $977,500
- Number of Payouts: 36

Final Table
Place	Name	Prize
1st	Johnny Chan	$303,025
2nd	Phil Laak	$156,400
3rd	Richard Osborne	$78,200
4th	Frank Kassela	$68,425
5th	Jerri Thomas	$58,650
6th	Tony Hartmann	$48,875
7th	Richard Harroch	$39,100
8th	Ashok Surapaneni	$29,325
9th	Humberto Brenes	$19,550

=== Event 26: $1,000 Ladies - No Limit Hold'em ===
June 26, 2005

- Number of buy-ins: 601
- Total Prize Pool: $546,910
- Number of Payouts: 54

Final Table
Place	Name	Prize
1st	Jennifer Tilly	$158,335
2nd	Ann Le	$83,540
3rd	Carolyn Ancheta	$43,680
4th	Cecilia Reyes Mortensen	$38,220
5th	Angel Word	$32,815
6th	Teresa Chang	$27,345
7th	Susan Carpenter	$21,875
8th	Beth Shak	$16,405
9th	Janis Numan	$10,940

=== Event 27: $5,000 Pot Limit Omaha ===
June 28, 2005

- Number of buy-ins: 134
- Number of Rebuys: 229
- Total Prize Pool: $1,765,568
- Number of Payouts: 9

Final Table
Place	Name	Prize
1st	Phil Ivey	$635,603
2nd	Robert Williamson III	$353,115
3rd	Davood Mehrmand	$194,210
4th	Allen Cunningham	$141,245
5th	Surinder Sunar	$123,590
6th	Sigi Stockinger	$105,935
7th	Eddy Scharf	$88,280
8th	Phil Hellmuth	$70,625
9th	E.C. Cohen	$52,965

=== Event 28: $5,000 Limit Hold'em ===
June 29, 2005

- Number of buy-ins: 269
- Total Prize Pool: $1,264,300
- Number of Payouts: 27

Final Table
Place	Name	Prize
1st	Dan Schmiech	$404,585
2nd	Gabe Kaplan	$222,515
3rd	James Kwon	$113,785
4th	Annie Duke	$88,500
5th	Joe Sebok	$75,860
6th	Luke Neely	$63,215
7th	Jeff Shulman	$50,570
8th	Young Phan	$37,930
9th	Greg Mueller	$25,285

=== Event 29: $2,000 No Limit Hold'em ===
June 30, 2005

- Number of buy-ins: 1,072
- Total Prize Pool: $1,972,480
- Number of Payouts: 100

Final Table
Place	Name	Prize
1st	Lawrence Gosney	$483,195
2nd	Jarl Lindholt	$258,000
3rd	Hyung Ko	$157,800
4th	Dustin Woolf	$138,075
5th	J.C. Tran	$118,350
6th	Tony Rila	$98,625
7th	Alan Purdy	$78,900
8th	Carlo Citrone	$59,175
9th	Bjorn Isberg	$39,450

=== Event 30: $5,000 No Limit Hold'em Short Handed ===
June 30, 2005

- Number of buy-ins: 301
- Total Prize Pool: $1,414,700
- Number of Payouts: 48

Final Table
Place	Name	Prize
1st	Doyle Brunson	$367,800
2nd	Minh Ly	$203,715
3rd	Scotty Nguyen	$106,105
4th	Layne Flack	$99,030
5th	Ayaz Mahmood	$82,055
6th	Jason Lester	$67,905

=== Event 31: $1,500 Razz ===
June 30, 2005

- Number of buy-ins: 291
- Total Prize Pool: $401,580
- Number of Payouts: 24

Final Table
Place	Name	Prize
1st	O'Neil Longson	$125,690
2nd	Bruno Fitoussi	$70,275
3rd	Al Barbieri	$42,165
4th	Archie Karas	$30,120
5th	Mike Wattel	$24,900
6th	Mick Wernick	$19,675
7th	Larry Cesareo	$15,660
8th	Hassan Kamoei	$11,245

=== Event 32: $5,000 Omaha Hi/Lo 8/OB ===
July 2, 2005

- Number of buy-ins: 224
- Total Prize Pool: $1,052,800
- Number of Payouts: 18

Final Table
Place	Name	Prize
1st	David Chiu	$347,410
2nd	Russ Salzer	$191,610
3rd	Haim Kakoun	$105,280
4th	Danny Horowitz	$84,225
5th	Stephen Ladowsky	$63,170
6th	Hiroshi Shimamura	$52,640
7th	Allen Cunningham	$42,110
8th	Patrick Bueno	$31,585
9th	Daniel Shak	$21,055

=== Event 33: $3,000 No Limit Hold'em ===
July 3, 2005

- Number of buy-ins: 1,010
- Total Prize Pool: $2,787,600
- Number of Payouts: 100

Final Table
Place	Name	Prize
1st	Andre Boyer	$682,810
2nd	Matthew Glantz	$364,620
3rd	Jerry Young	$223,010
4th	Dennis Perry	$195,130
5th	Michael Carroll	$167,255
6th	Robert Betts	$139,380
7th	Kenneth Blanton	$111,505
8th	Morten Jensen	$83,630
9th	John Duthie	$55,750

=== Event 34: $1,000 Seniors No Limit Hold'em ===
July 3, 2005

- Number of buy-ins: 825
- Total Prize Pool: $750,750
- Number of Payouts: 72

Final Table
Place	Name	Prize
1st	Paul McKinney	$202,725
2nd	Robert Hume	$106,230
3rd	Paul Fischman	$60,060
4th	Robert Redman	$52,555
5th	Charles Zeghibe	$45,045
6th	Louis Barkoutsis	$37,540
7th	Peter Vilandos	$30,030
8th	Daniel Klein	$22,525
9th	Carol Bollinger	$15,015

=== Event 35: $10,000 Pot Limit Omaha ===
July 4, 2005

- Number of buy-ins: 165
- Total Prize Pool: $1,551,000
- Number of Payouts: 18

Final Table
Place	Name	Prize
1st	Rafi Amit	$511,835
2nd	Vinny Vinh	$282,280
3rd	Jeff Rine	$155,100
4th	Derex Baxter	$124,080
5th	Simon Trumper	$93,060
6th	Todd Brunson	$77,550
7th	Ferit Gabriellson	$62,040
8th	Erik Seidel	$46,530
9th	Istvan Novak	$31,020

=== Event 36: $3,000 Limit Hold'em ===
July 4, 2005

- Number of buy-ins: 406
- Total Prize Pool: $1,120,560
- Number of Payouts: 36

Final Table
Place	Name	Prize
1st	Todd Witteles	$347,385
2nd	Daryl Mixan	$179,290
3rd	Kieu Duong	$89,645
4th	Ralph Perry	$78,440
5th	Matt Hawrilenko	$67,235
6th	Craig Crivello	$56,030
7th	Cyndy Violette	$44,820
8th	Mike Nargi	$33,615
9th	Matt Matros	$22,410

=== Event 37: $1,000 No-Limit Hold'em ===
June 29, 2005

- Number of buy-ins: 894
- Number of Rebuys: 1,584
- Total Prize Pool: $2,350,020
- Number of Payouts: 81

Final Table
Place	Name	Prize
1st	Jon Heneghan	$611,015
2nd	Paul Deng	$324,305
3rd	Robert Aron	$188,000
4th	Gary Do	$164,500
5th	Alex Balandin	$141,000
6th	Freddy Deeb	$117,500
7th	Barry Greenstein	$94,000
8th	John Kim	$70,500
9th	Les Amoils	$47,000

=== Event 38: $1,000 No Limit Hold'em ===
- WSOP Satellite

=== Event 39: $5,000 No Limit 2-7 Draw Lowball ===
July 6, 2005

- Number of buy-ins: 65
- Number of Rebuys: 139
- Total Prize Pool: $986,860
- Number of Payouts: 7

Final Table
Place	Name	Prize
1st	David Grey	$365,135
2nd	John Hennigan	$217,110
3rd	Dewey Tomko	$138,160
4th	Mark Weitzman	$108,555
5th	Doug Booth	$78,950
6th	Russ Salzer	$49,345
7th	Jeff Lisandro	$29,605

=== Event 40: $1,000 No Limit Hold'em ===
- WSOP Satellite

=== Event 41: No Limit Hold'em Media ===
- WSOP Charity event

=== Event 42: $10,000 No Limit Hold'em Main Event ===
July 15, 2005

- Number of buy-ins: 5,619
- Total Prize Pool: $52,818,610
- Number of Payouts: 560

Final Table
Place	Name	Prize
1st	Joseph Hachem	$7,500,000
2nd	Steve Dannenmann	$4,250,000
3rd	Tex Barch	$2,500,000
4th	Aaron Kanter	$2,000,000
5th	Andrew Black	$1,750,000
6th	Scott Lazar	$1,500,000
7th	Daniel Bergsdorf	$1,300,000
8th	Brad Kondracki	$1,150,000
9th	Mike Matusow	$1,000,000

=== Event 43: $1,500 No Limit Hold'em ===
July 11, 2005

- Number of buy-ins: 765
- Total Prize Pool: $1,146,870
- Number of Payouts: 72

Final Table
Place	Name	Prize
1st	Ronald Kirk	$321,520
2nd	Adam White	$168,520
3rd	Didier Leroy	$95,725
4th	Alvin Horwitz	$83,365
5th	Joe Bartholdi	$71,445
6th	Erik Seidel	$59,545
7th	Magnus Betnér	$47,640
8th	Sherkhan Farnood	$35,730
9th	Hasan Harajli	$23,820

=== Event 44: $1,000 No Limit Hold'em ===
July 12, 2005

- Number of buy-ins: 971
- Total Prize Pool: $882,505
- Number of Payouts: 89

Final Table
Place	Name	Prize
1st	John Pires	$220,935
2nd	Eli Balas	$120,835
3rd	Douglas Carli	$70,690
4th	Mika Puro	$61,855
5th	John Baerlein	$53,015
6th	Mark Petrillo	$44,180
7th	Matthew Milliken	$35,345
8th	Haddad Gilles	$26,510
9th	Anthony Esposito	$17,670

=== Event 45: $1,000 No Limit Hold'em ===
July 13, 2005

- Number of buy-ins: 758
- Total Prize Pool: $697,360
- Number of Payouts: 72

Final Table
Place	Name	Prize
1st	Willie Tann	$188,355
2nd	Matthew Smith	$98,675
3rd	Thor Hansen	$55,790
4th	Chris Short	$48,815
5th	Gary Haglund	$41,840
6th	Ravi Babber	$34,870
7th	Ryian Jensen	$27,895
8th	Bennett Cloud	$20,920
9th	Jacob Zalewski	$13,945
