= World Series of Poker Tournament of Champions =

Poker tournament

The World Series of Poker Tournament of Champions (WSOP ToC) is an invitational freeroll poker event. The WSOP ToC has been played intermittently five times in the 21st Century with different formats. The four WSOP ToC events held from 2004 to 2010 did not count as official WSOP bracelets events, with the winners receiving instead a large trophy in the shape of the official World Series of Poker logo. In 2010, the WSOP Tournament of Champions returned with a new format more akin to a typical sports league All-Star Event format. 27 players vied for $1 million, with 20 of those players selected by the fans via online vote at the WSOP's website. Controversies over the inclusion of commercially sponsored players resulted in a hiatus in the WSOP ToC for over a decade.

The WSOP ToC was reintroduced in 2022 as an official WSOP bracelet event (linked to the World Series of Poker Circuit).

== Results ==
Year	Status	Winner	Prize (US$)	Runner-up
2004	Non-bracelet event	(United States) Annie Duke	$2,000,000	(United States) Phil Hellmuth
2005	Non-bracelet event	(United States) Mike Matusow	$1,000,000	(United States) Hoyt Corkins
2006	Non-bracelet event	(United States) Mike Sexton	$1,000,000	(Canada) Daniel Negreanu
2007–2009	event not held			
2010	Non-bracelet event	(United States) Huck Seed	$500,000	(United States) Howard Lederer
2011–2021	event not held			
2022	Bracelet event (at WSOP in Las Vegas)	(United States) Benjamin Kaupp	$250,000	(United States) Raul Garza
2023	Bracelet event (at WSOP in Las Vegas)	(United States) Ronnie Day	$200,000	(United States) Brent Gregory
2024	Bracelet event (standalone event in Los Angeles)	(China) Dong Meng	$200,000	(United States) Kevin Will
2025	Bracelet event (standalone event in Los Angeles)	(Canada) Kevin Li	$200,000	(United States) Shawn Rice

=== 2004 ===
The first event took place on 1 September 2004 with invitations only being extended to ten of the most well-known names on the poker tournament circuit at the time. The winner took home a $2,000,000 prize. No other participants received prize money.

Position	Competitor
1st	Annie Duke
2nd	Phil Hellmuth
3rd	Howard Lederer
4th	Johnny Chan
5th	Greg Raymer
6th	Doyle Brunson
7th	Daniel Negreanu
8th	Phil Ivey
9th	T. J. Cloutier
10th	David "Chip" Reese

=== 2005 ===
The 2005 event took place between November 6 and November 8 at Caesars Palace in Las Vegas. Prior to the event, Harrah's advertised that to qualify a player would need to reach the final table of the 2005 World Series of Poker $10,000 no limit Texas hold 'em championship event, or win any World Series of Poker Circuit event. Mike Matusow defeated Hoyt Corkins heads-up to win the tournament and the prize of $1,000,000.

Controversy erupted however when Pepsi, the event's sponsor, insisted that Phil Hellmuth, Doyle Brunson, and Johnny Chan be granted Sponsor Exemptions. Despite public protests from other players that they were lied to as the event was billed as one that one had to qualify for, ESPN and Harrah's newly hired Vice President of Sports and Entertainment Marketing, Jeffrey Pollack allowed the three to participate. Hellmuth finished third, while Chan and Brunson missed the final table, coming in 13th and 10th, respectively.

From 2006 onward, Harrah's reserved the right to let in up to six players via sponsor's exemptions.

Position	Competitor	Prize
1st	Mike Matusow	$1,000,000
2nd	Hoyt Corkins	$325,000
3rd	Phil Hellmuth	$250,000
4th	Tony Bloom	$150,000
5th	Steve Dannenmann	$100,000
6th	Grant Lang	$75,000
7th	David Levi	$50,000
8th	Keith Sexton	$25,000
9th	Brandon Adams	$25,000

=== 2006 ===
The 2006 field of twenty-seven players included the 9 players who made the final table of the 2005 World Series of Poker main event, the winners of the 11 WSOP Circuit events in the preceding calendar year, and some sponsor exemptions.

Position	Competitor	Prize
1st	Mike Sexton	$1,000,000
2nd	Daniel Negreanu	$325,000
3rd	Mike Matusow	$250,000
4th	Chris Reslock	$150,000
5th	Andy Black	$100,000
6th	Darrell Dicken	$75,000
7th	Chris Ferguson	$50,000
8th	Thang Pham	$25,000
9th	Daniel Bergsdorf	$25,000

Other qualifiers and invitees

2005 World Series of Poker Main Event Final Table Players:

- Joe Hachem
- Steve Dannenmann
- John "Tex" Barch
- Aaron Kanter
- Scott Lazar
- Brad Kondracki

WSOP Circuit Event Winners:

- Gregg Merkow (Grand Casino Tunica)
- Vinny Vinh (Caesars Indiana)
- Abraham Korotki (Harrah's Atlantic City)
- Jeffrey King (Caesars Atlantic City)
- John Spadavecchia (Caesars Palace)
- Peter Feldman (Harrah's New Orleans)
- Clint Baskin (Harrah's Lake Tahoe)

Sponsor Exemptions:

- Doyle Brunson
- Gus Hansen
- Phil Hellmuth
- Mike O'Malley
- Sarah Strom (contest winner)

=== 2007 ===
Harrah's put the Tournament of Champions on hold indefinitely.

=== 2010 ===
On March 15, 2010, Harrah's and the World Series of Poker announced that the WSOP Tournament of Champions would return on June 27, 2010, when 27 players competed in a freeroll for $1 million in prize money. The new format is an All-Star Event format, where the public decided which players participated in the event from a list of 521 current WSOP bracelet-holders.

The public decided the 20 players via an online vote at www.WSOP.com/TOC. Voting was open from March 15, 2010, until midnight ET on June 15, 2010. Voted in were: Phil Ivey, Daniel Negreanu, Doyle Brunson, Phil Hellmuth, Chris Ferguson, Allen Cunningham, Johnny Chan, Scotty Nguyen, Barry Greenstein, John Juanda, Erik Seidel, Jennifer Harman, Huck Seed, Dan Harrington, T. J. Cloutier, Sammy Farha, Howard Lederer, Greg Raymer, Joe Hachem and Antonio Esfandiari.

Five of the seats were automatically awarded. The reigning WSOP Champion Joe Cada, the reigning WSOP Europe Champion Barry Shulman and the three previous TOC winners: Annie Duke, Mike Matusow and Mike Sexton.

The remaining two seats were awarded as sponsor exemptions by Harrah's, to Andrew Barton and Bertrand "Elky" Grospellier.

On June 27, the 27 players began play in the Amazon Room at the Rio All-Suite Hotel & Casino in Las Vegas. The final nine players returned to play the final table on July 4, 2010, in the same location.

Position	Competitor	Prize
1st	Huck Seed	$500,000
2nd	Howard Lederer	$250,000
3rd	Johnny Chan	$100,000
4th	Joe Hachem	$25,000
5th	Barry Greenstein	$25,000
6th	Daniel Negreanu	$25,000
7th	Jennifer Harman	$25,000
8th	Annie Duke	$25,000
9th	T. J. Cloutier	$25,000

=== 2022 ===
In 2022, the WSOP ToC was reintroduced to automatically include the season's winners of all WSOP Circuit Events played at regional casinos and online, as well as WSOP bracelet winners in Las Vegas from the previous year. 470 Champions out of an eligible 569 qualifiers participated in the 2022 WSOP ToC. The top 60 participants split a prize pool of $1 million with a first prize of $250,000.

Position	Competitor	Prize
1st	Benjamin Kaupp	$250,000
2nd	Raul Garza	$150,000
3rd	Ryan Messick	$100,000
4th	Robert Cohen	$75,000
5th	Ali Eslami	$50,000
6th	Gregory Wish	$37,500
7th	Yuliyan Kolev	$27,500
8th	Eric Bensimhon	$20,000
9th	Gianluca Speranza	$15,000
10th	Jonathan Woof	$11,400
