= Kevin Saul =

American poker player (born 1980)

- Nickname: BeL0WaB0Ve

World Series of Poker
- Bracelet: None
- Money finishes: 6
- Highest WSOP Main Event finish: 216th, 2011

World Poker Tour
- Title: 1
- Final table: 1
- Money finishes: 2

European Poker Tour
- Title: None
- Final table: 1
- Money finish: 1

Kevin Saul (born May 25, 1980) is an American professional poker player from Warrenville, Illinois.

Saul is known for his online nickname "BeL0WaB0Ve" on sites such as PokerStars, Bodog and UltimateBet and is also known by the name "GetPWN3D" on Full Tilt Poker. He became better known outside the online poker community in 2007 when he won the World Poker Tour (WPT) Bellagio Cup III Championship after defeating Mike Matusow during heads-up play, earning him the first place prize of $1,342,320.

At the 2009 European Poker Tour's PokerStars Caribbean Adventure, Saul who held the chip lead during the previous day of play until losing a big pot against Team PokerStarsPro member Alexandre Gomes leaving him as the third shortest stack coming in to the final table, unable to mount a comeback he was the first eliminated, finishing in eighth place, earning $214,000.

Saul is also a guest instructor, along with other online professionals such as Eric Lynch at PokerXFactor.com, an online poker training center headed by Cliff Josephy and Eric Haber.

As of 2010, his total live tournament winnings exceed $2,000,000
