= 2005 World Series of Poker =

Series of poker tournaments

- Location: Rio All-Suite Hotel and Casino and Binion's Horseshoe, Las Vegas, Nevada
- Dates: June 2 – July 15

Champion
- (Australia) Joe Hachem

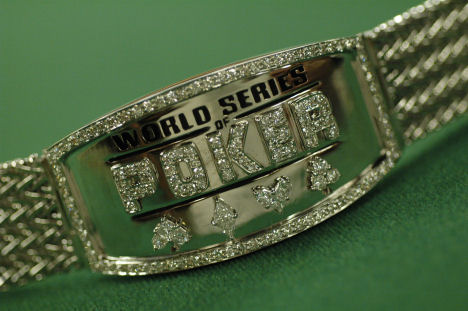
The 2005 WSOP Championship Bracelet

The 2005 World Series of Poker opened play on June 2, continuing through the Main Event No Limit World Championship starting on July 7. The conclusion of the Main Event on July 15 marked the close of play, and the largest prize in sports and/or television history at the time ($7,500,000) was awarded to the winner. ESPN's broadcast began July 19 with coverage of WSOP Circuit Tournaments, and coverage of the Main Event began October 11 and ended November 15.

All events were held at the Rio All Suite Hotel and Casino with the exception of the final 2 days of the Main Event which were held at Binion's Horseshoe. This marked the last time the Main Event final table was held at Binion's Horseshoe.

== Events ==
There were 42 preliminary events that awarded bracelets in the 2005 WSOP. Doyle Brunson and Johnny Chan both broke their tie with Johnny Moss and Phil Hellmuth to become the first players to win ten career bracelets.

| # | Date | Event | Entries | Winner | Prize | Runner-up | Results |
|---|---|---|---|---|---|---|---|
| 1 | June 2, 2005 | $500 Casino Employees No Limit Hold'em | 662 | Andy Nguyen (1/1) | $83,390 | Danilo Flores | Results |
| 2 | June 3, 2005 | $1,500 No Limit Hold'em | 2,305 | Allen Cunningham (1/3) | $725,405 | Scott Fischman (0/2) | Results |
| 3 | June 4, 2005 | $1,500 Pot Limit Hold'em | 1,071 | Thom Werthmann (1/1) | $369,535 | Layne Flack (0/5) | Results |
| 4 | June 5, 2005 | $1,500 Limit Hold-em | 1,049 | Eric Froehlich (1/1) | $361,910 | Jason Steinhorn | Results |
| 5 | June 6, 2005 | $1,500 Omaha Hi-Lo Split | 699 | Pat Poels (1/1) | $270,100 | John Lukas | Results |
| 6 | June 7, 2005 | $2,500 Short-Handed No Limit Hold'em | 548 | Isaac Galazan (1/1) | $315,125 | Harry Demetriou | Results |
| 7 | June 8, 2005 | $1,000 No Limit Hold'Em | 826 | Michael Gracz (1/1) | $594,460 | C. T. Law | Results |
| 8 | June 9, 2005 | $1,500 Seven-Card Stud | 472 | Cliff Josephy (1/1) | $192,150 | Kirill Gerasimov | Results |
| 9 | June 10, 2005 | $2,000 No Limit Hold 'Em | 1,403 | Erik Seidel (1/7) | $611,795 | Cyndy Violette (0/1) | Results |
| 10 | June 11, 2005 | $2,000 Limit Hold'em | 569 | Reza Payvar (1/1) | $303,610 | Toto Leonidas | Results |
| 11 | June 12, 2005 | $2,000 Pot Limit Hold'Em | 540 | Edward Moncada (1/1) | $298,070 | Steven Hudak | Results |
| 12 | June 13, 2005 | $2,000 Pot Limit Omaha | 212 | Josh Arieh (1/2) | $381,600 | Chris Ferguson (0/5) | Results |
| 13 | June 14, 2005 | $5,000 No Limit Hold'Em | 466 | T. J. Cloutier (1/6) | $657,100 | Steve Zoine | Results |
| 14 | June 15, 2005 | $1,000 Seven Card Stud Hi-Lo Split | 595 | Steve Hohn (1/1) | $156,985 | Mike Wattel (0/1) | Results |
| 15 | June 15, 2005 | $1,500 Limit Hold' Em Shootout | 450 | Mark Seif (1/1) | $181,330 | William Shaw | Results |
| 16 | June 17, 2005 | $1,500 No-Limit Hold'em Shootout | 780 | Anthony Reategui (1/1) | $269,100 | Paul Kroh | Results |
| 17 | June 18, 2005 | $2,500 Limit Hold 'Em | 373 | Quinn Do (1/1) | $265,975 | Qi Chi Chang | Results |
| 18 | June 19, 2005 | $2,000 Seven-Card Stud Hi-Lo Split | 279 | Denis Ethier (1/1) | $160,682 | Chad Brown | Results |
| 19 | June 19, 2005 | $1,500 Pot Limit Omaha | 291 | Barry Greenstein (1/2) | $128,505 | Paul Vinci | Results |
| 20 | June 20, 2005 | $5,000 Pot Limit Hold 'Em | 239 | Brian Wilson (1/1) | $370,685 | John Gale | Results |
| 21 | June 21, 2005 | $2,500 Omaha Hi-Lo Split | 359 | Todd Brunson (1/1) | $255,945 | Allen Kessler | Results |
| 22 | June 22, 2005 | $1,500 No Limit Hold'em | 2,013 | Mark Seif (2/2) | $611,145 | Minh Nguyen (0/2) | Results |
| 23 | June 23, 2005 | $5,000 Seven-Card Stud | 192 | Jan Vang Sørensen (1/2) | $293,275 | Keith Sexton | Results |
| 24 | June 24, 2005 | $2,500 No Limit Hold'em | 1,056 | Farzad Bonyadi (1/3) | $594,960 | Lars Bonding | Results |
| 25 | June 25, 2005 | $2,500 Pot Limit Hold'Em | 425 | Johnny Chan (1/10) | $303,025 | Phil Laak | Results |
| 26 | June 26, 2005 | $1,000 Ladies' No Limit Hold'em | 601 | Jennifer Tilly (1/1) | $158,335 | Anh Le | Results |
| 27 | June 26, 2005 | $5,000 Pot Limit Omaha | 134 | Phil Ivey (1/5) | $635,603 | Robert Williamson III (0/1) | Results |
| 28 | June 27, 2005 | $5,000 Limit Hold'em | 269 | Dan Schmiech (1/1) | $404,585 | Gabe Kaplan | Results |
| 29 | June 29, 2005 | $2,000 No Limit Hold 'Em | 1,072 | Lawrence Gosney (1/1) | $483,195 | Jarl Lindholt | Results |
| 30 | June 29, 2005 | $1,500 Seven-Card Razz | 291 | O'Neil Longson (1/3) | $125,690 | Bruno Fitoussi | Results |
| 31 | June 29, 2005 | $5,000 Short-Handed No Limit Hold'em | 301 | Doyle Brunson (1/10) | $367,800 | Minh Ly | Results |
| 32 | June 30, 2005 | $5,000 Omaha Hi-Lo Split | 224 | David Chiu (1/4) | $347,410 | Russell Salzer | Results |
| 33 | July 1, 2005 | $3,000 No Limit Hold'em | 1,010 | Andre Boyer (1/1) | $682,810 | Matthew Glantz | Results |
| 34 | July 2, 2005 | $1,000 Seniors' No Limit Hold'em | 825 | Paul McKinney (1/1) | $202,725 | Robert Hume | Results |
| 35 | July 2, 2005 | $10,000 Pot Limit Omaha | 165 | Rafi Amit (1/1) | $511,835 | Vinny Vinh | Results |
| 36 | July 3, 2005 | $3,000 Limit Hold'em | 406 | Todd Witteles (1/1) | $347,385 | Daryl Mixan | Results |
| 37 | July 4, 2005 | $1,000 No Limit Hold'em | 894 | Jon Heneghan (1/1) | $611,015 | Paul Deng | Results |
| 38 | | $1,000 Main Event Satellite | | | | | |
| 39 | July 5, 2005 | $5,000 No Limit 2 to 7 Draw Lowball | 65 | David Grey (1/2) | $365,135 | John Hennigan (0/2) | Results |
| 40 | | $1,000 Main Event Satellite | | | | | |
| 41 | | Media/Celebrity Charity Event | | Randy Boman | $10,000 | Jake Witcher | Results |
| 42 | July 7, 2005 | $10,000 World Championship No Limit Hold'em Main Event | 5,619 | Joe Hachem (1/1) | $7,500,000 | Steve Dannenmann | Results |
| 43 | July 13, 2005 | $1,500 No Limit Hold'em | 765 | Ron Kirk (1/1) | $321,520 | Adam White | Results |
| 44 | July 14, 2005 | $1,000 No Limit Hold'em | 971 | John Pires (1/1) | $220,935 | Eli Balas (0/3) | Results |
| 45 | July 15, 2005 | $1,000 No Limit Hold'em | 758 | Willie Tann (1/1) | $188,335 | Matthew Smith | Results |

== Main Event ==
There were 5,619 entrants to the main event. Each paid $10,000 to enter what was the largest poker tournament ever played in a brick and mortar casino at the time. Many entrants won their seat in online poker tournaments. 2004 Main Event champion Greg Raymer finished in 25th place in his title defense.

=== Final table ===
| Name | Number of chips (percentage of total) | WSOP Bracelets* | WSOP Cashes* | WSOP Earnings* |
|---|---|---|---|---|
| (United States) Aaron Kanter | 10,700,000 (19.0%) | 0 | 0 | 0 |
| (United States) Tex Barch | 9,330,000 (16.6%) | 0 | 1 | $4,000 |
| (Republic of Ireland) Andrew Black | 8,140,000 (14.5%) | 0 | 3 | $63,380 |
| (United States) Mike Matusow | 7,410,000 (13.2%) | 2 | 14 | $953,190 |
| (United States) Steve Dannenmann | 5,460,000 (9.7%) | 0 | 0 | 0 |
| (Australia) Joe Hachem | 5,420,000 (9.6%) | 0 | 1 | $25,850 |
| (Sweden) Daniel Bergsdorf | 5,270,000 (9.4%) | 0 | 0 | 0 |
| (United States) Scott Lazar | 3,370,000 (6.0%) | 0 | 1 | $2,100 |
| (United States) Brad Kondracki | 1,180,000 (2.1%) | 0 | 0 | 0 |

*Career statistics prior to the beginning of the 2005 Main Event.

=== Final table results ===
| Place | Name | Prize |
|---|---|---|
| 1st | Joe Hachem | $7,500,000 |
| 2nd | Steve Dannenmann | $4,250,000 |
| 3rd | Tex Barch | $2,500,000 |
| 4th | Aaron Kanter | $2,000,000 |
| 5th | Andy Black | $1,750,000 |
| 6th | Scott Lazar | $1,500,000 |
| 7th | Daniel Bergsdorf | $1,300,000 |
| 8th | Brad Kondracki | $1,150,000 |
| 9th | Mike Matusow | $1,000,000 |

=== Other High Finishes ===
NB: This list is restricted to top 100 finishers with an existing Wikipedia entry.

| Place | Name | Prize |
|---|---|---|
| 11th | Shawn Sheikhan | $600,000 |
| 13th | Bernard Lee | $400,000 |
| 15th | Tiffany Williamson | $400,000 |
| 19th | Minh Ly | $304,680 |
| 20th | Phil Ivey | $304,680 |
| 22nd | Tom Vu | $304,680 |
| 25th | Greg Raymer | $304,680 |
| 31st | John Juanda | $274,090 |
| 37th | Roland Israelashvili | $235,390 |
| 46th | Lee Watkinson | $235,390 |
| 52nd | Rod Pardey Sr. | $173,880 |
| 59th | Russ Hamilton | $145,875 |
| 89th | Can Kim Hua | $91,950 |
| 93rd | Nick Cassavetes | $77,710 |

=== Performance of past champions ===
| Name | Championship Year(s) | Day of Elimination |
|---|---|---|
| Doyle Brunson | 1976, 1977 | 1 |
| Tom McEvoy | 1983 | 1 |
| Johnny Chan | 1987, 1988 | 1 |
| Phil Hellmuth | 1989 | 1 |
| Jim Bechtel | 1993 | 1 |
| Russ Hamilton | 1994 | 4 (59th) |
| Dan Harrington | 1995 | 2 |
| Huck Seed | 1996 | 2 |
| Scotty Nguyen | 1998 | 1 |
| Chris Ferguson | 2000 | 1 |
| Carlos Mortensen | 2001 | 1 |
| Robert Varkonyi | 2002 | 1 |
| Chris Moneymaker | 2003 | 2 |
| Greg Raymer | 2004 | 6 (25th) |

== See also ==
- World Series of Poker Circuit events
- World Series of Poker Tournament of Champions
- 2005 World Series of Poker Results
