= Dan Druff =

Dan Druff may refer to:

- Dan Druff (musician), born Daniel James Irving, rock musician
- Todd Witteles, professional poker player known as Dan Druff

== See also ==
- Dandruff, excessive shedding of dead skin cells from the scalp
