= Big Game (poker) =

Cash game in Las Vegas

The Big Game is a high-stakes poker cash game played in "Bobby's Room", a cardroom named after Bobby Baldwin, at the Bellagio casino in Las Vegas. In 2010, the game partially expanded to "The Ivey Room" at Aria Resort and Casino. The table features no-limit and pot-limit games with wagers up to $100,000 per hand. Limit games as high as $4,000/$8,000 are often played but $800/$1,600 is normal.

== Structure ==
The table features a variety of poker games played in rotation and changing every 8–10 hands. The games are selected from a list of the players' choices, including:

- Texas hold 'em (limit and no limit)
- Seven-card stud (straight high, eight or better Hi/Lo, Hi/Lo without qualifiers, limit)
- Omaha (straight high, eight or better Hi/Lo, limit and pot limit)
- Deuce-to-seven triple draw (limit)
- Deuce-to-seven single draw (no limit)
- Ace-to-Five triple draw (limit)
- Ace-to-Five single draw (no limit)
- Razz (limit)

== Usual players ==
Usually players buy in for $200,000–300,000, but anyone with the minimum buy in of $20,000 is welcome to play. In addition to the occasional drop-in player, the following players have been known to play regularly in the Big Game over the years:

- Patrik Antonius
- David Benyamine
- Todd Brunson
- Johnny Chan
- Allen Cunningham
- Tom Dwan
- Eli Elezra
- Sammy Farha
- Ted Forrest
- Chau Giang
- Barry Greenstein
- David Grey
- Gus Hansen
- Jennifer Harman
- John Hennigan
- Phil Ivey
- Guy Laliberté
- Minh Ly
- Daniel Negreanu
- David Oppenheim
- Ralph Perry
- Nick Schulman
- Huck Seed

Chip Reese and Doyle Brunson were regulars until their deaths in 2007 and 2023, respectively.
