= Mike Sexton =

American poker player and commentator (1947–2020)

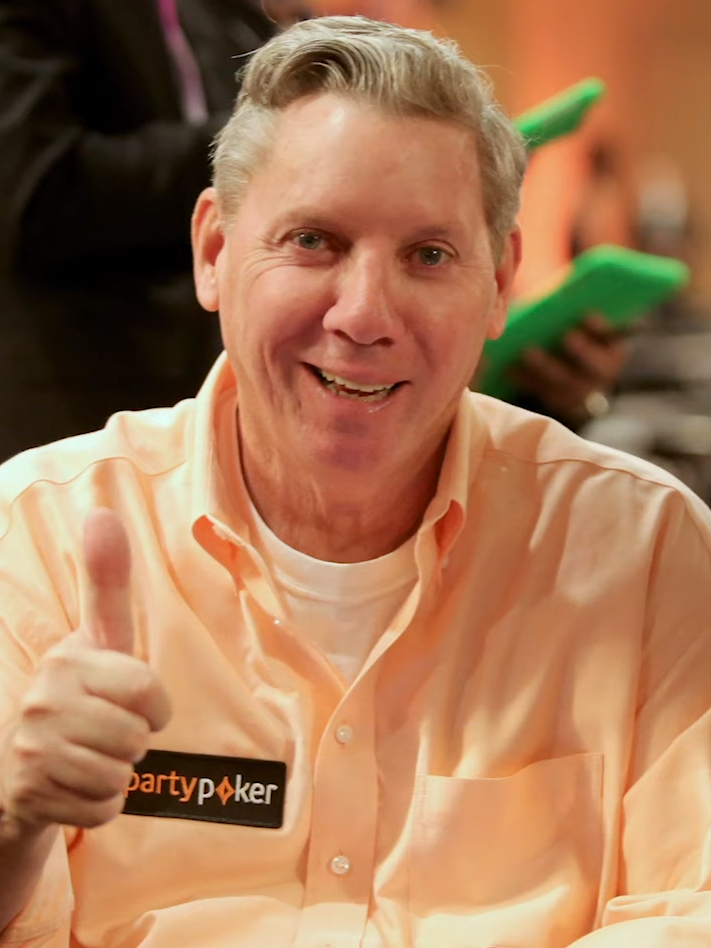
- Sexton in 2019
- Nickname: The Ambassador of Poker
- Born: Michael Richard Sexton; September 22, 1947; Dayton, Ohio, U.S.
- Died: September 6, 2020 (aged 72); Las Vegas, Nevada, U.S.
- School: Poker Basics Optimization
- Slogan: May all your cards be live and your pots be monster
- Catchphrase: Bingo! Bango! Bongo!
World Series of Poker
- Bracelet: 1
- Final tables: 23
- Money finishes: 59
- Highest WSOP Main Event finish: 12th, 2000
World Poker Tour
- Title: 1
- Final tables: 4
- Money finishes: 17

Michael Richard Sexton (September 22, 1947 – September 6, 2020) was an American professional poker player and commentator. He was inducted into the Poker Hall of Fame in 2009.

== Early years ==
Sexton was a gymnast and attended Ohio State University, where he earned a degree in public recreation after changing majors from business. He joked that he majored in poker because he played very frequently in college. He also regularly played contract bridge and taught classes on it in North Carolina.

Sexton joined the U.S. Army as a paratrooper assigned to the 82nd Airborne Division in 1970. The division had just returned from Vietnam and Sexton never saw combat. While he was in the army, he taught ballroom dancing, and one of his clients convinced him to try being a salesman, which he continued to do after his two-year enlistment was up. After a while, he realized that he could make more money playing poker than being a salesman, so he took up poker in 1977.

In 1985 he moved to Nevada to pursue poker full-time. Sexton was a well-known cohort of poker player Stu Ungar, and was a pallbearer and speaker at Ungar's funeral.

== Poker player and promoter ==
=== World Poker Tour ===
On the World Poker Tour (WPT), Sexton had seventeen career cashes in WPT tournaments, including four final tables. In November 2016, Sexton won the WPT Montreal Main Event, besting a field of 648 entries to win the US$317,896 first prize, on a buy-in of CAD$3,850 per player. It was his third time reaching a WPT final table and his first WPT victory. At the time of his death, his career WPT earnings were $1,011,725, ranking him 233rd in WPT earnings, as well as holding 64th place for 4 WPT final table appearances.

Sexton also served as the lead commentator on WPT telecasts, working alongside Vince Van Patten for the program's first fifteen seasons.

=== World Series of Poker ===
Sexton won several tournaments, including one World Series of Poker bracelet, and almost $5,700,000 in total WSOP tournament winnings. He won his bracelet in the $1,500 seven-card stud split event at the 1989 World Series of Poker. His 72 cashes at the WSOP account for $2.6 million of his total winnings. Sexton finished 10th in a preliminary event at the 2005 World Series of Poker and also in the final 16 of Poker Superstars II. On June 27, 2006, Sexton won the third annual World Series of Poker Tournament of Champions event, and along with it the $1,000,000 first prize. In the final hand, his A♥ A♣ defeated Daniel Negreanu's Q♥ J♥ on a board of 10♦ 8♦ 4♠ A♦ 8♣. In July 2012, Sexton finished in 9th place in the "Big One for One Drop" WSOP event, earning him $1,109,333, the biggest cash of his career. During his final World Series of Poker in 2019, Sexton partnered with James Holzhauer, a famed game show contestant and sports gambler making his first World Series of Poker appearance.

World Series of Poker bracelets
Year	Tournament	Prize (US$)
1989	$1,500 Seven-Card Stud Split	$104,400

=== Commentator and promoter ===
A former commentator of the World Poker Tour, alongside Vince Van Patten, he wrote articles for Card Player Magazine and the Gambling Times. He founded the now-defunct Tournament of Champions of Poker, which only let tournament winners from the previous year compete.

=== PartyPoker ===
Sexton co-founded and was the chairman for PartyPoker.com, at one time the biggest online poker site in the United States, despite the company being under a $500K deficit after its first launch in 2002. Four years after launch, the company went public for $9 billion, but Sexton sold out his shares for $15 million a year and a half prior to the public offering. When addressing this, Sexton said that, even though the sale of his shares meant he missed a profit of about $500 million, he did not regret the decision he took at the time.

=== PokerNewsDaily ===
Over the course of his career, Sexton was closely associated with many legendary figures in poker. He expressed admiration for the late Stu Ungar, stating in an interview to Poker News Daily that if Ungar were still alive, he would have been "far and away the top superstar in the poker world and the greatest star in the World Poker Tour."

He gave several interviews on the news portal.

Sexton's impact on poker extended beyond his achievements as a player and commentator. He was widely regarded as one of the game's most influential figures, helping to shape modern poker through his work with both the WPT and PartyPoker.

=== Style ===
Sexton incorporated preflop steals into his play, raising before the flop with weaker hands in an attempt to win the blinds and antes without committing a significant portion of his chip stack.

== Charity ==
Sexton donated half of his post-tax winnings from his win in 2006 of the third annual World Series of Poker Tournament of Champions event, a prize of $1,000,000, to five charities. He pledged to do the same with all future winnings. In early 2009, Sexton along with Linda Johnson, Jan Fisher and Lisa Tenner, created PokerGives.org, a nonprofit organization that offers poker players an easier way to give to charity.

== Honors, awards, distinctions ==
Sexton was inducted into the Poker Hall of Fame in 2009. For all of his work promoting poker, Sexton was often known as "the ambassador of poker". On February 15, 2006, Sexton was recognized as the top poker ambassador at the Card Player Magazine Player of the Year Awards Gala.

On July 21, 2020, the WPT Champions Cup was renamed to the Mike Sexton WPT Champions Cup.

== Death ==
Sexton died on September 6, 2020, after being diagnosed with prostate cancer.

== Bibliography ==
- Shuffle Up and Deal: The Ultimate No Limit Texas Hold 'em Guide (2005) ISBN 0-06-076251-9
- Life's a Gamble (2016) ISBN 978-1-909457-56-0 Published by D&B Poker
