= Joe Hachem =

Lebanese Australian poker player (born 1966)

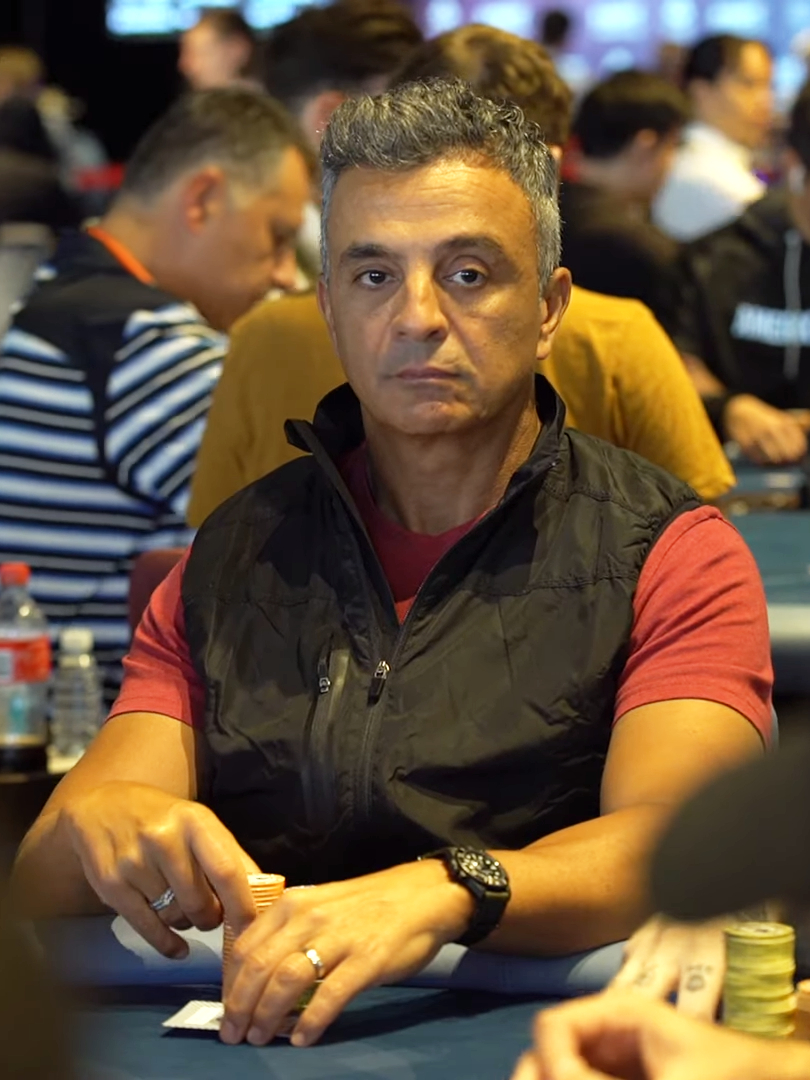
- Hachem in 2019
- Nicknames: Diamond Joe, The Australian God, Ozzie
- Born: 11 March 1966 (age 60)

World Series of Poker
- Bracelet: 1
- Money finishes: 38
- Highest WSOP Main Event finish: Winner, 2005

World Poker Tour
- Title: 1
- Final table: 1
- Money finishes: 12

European Poker Tour
- Title: None
- Final table: None
- Money finishes: 2

Joseph Hachem (Arabic: جوزف هاشم; /ˈhæʃəm/; born 11 March 1966) is a Lebanese-Australian professional poker player known for being the first Australian to win the World Series of Poker main event, which earned him $7.5 million, then a record for all-time biggest tournament prize.

The next year, Hachem won his first World Poker Tour title at the Bellagio Casino's Five Diamonds Poker Classic, earning him $2.2 million. He is one of only six poker players to win both a World Series of Poker main event and a World Poker Tour championship. Including his WSOP Main Event victory, Hachem has finished in the money in thirteen World Series events.

As of January 2018, Hachem's tournament winnings exceed $12,200,000, making him the 35th-highest ranked player in live tournament career earnings.

== Early life ==
Joseph Hachem was born in Lebanon on 11 March 1966. In 1972, at age six, Hachem and his family moved to Melbourne, Australia. He worked as a chiropractor for 13 years before giving up the career after developing a rare blood disorder that affected the blood vessels in his hands. Around 1995, while taking time off to consider his future, Hachem started to play poker with greater frequency, mostly in casinos, as well as online. He also ran a small brokerage business in Pascoe Vale, Victoria. Hachem said he was too temperamental when he first started playing poker and had to learn to control his temper. Around 2000, after years of casual playing, Hachem started playing regularly in tournaments at the Crown Casino and Entertainment Complex in Melbourne, where he often ended in the money. Hachem spent another five years playing regularly on the Melbourne tournament circuit before setting his sights on the World Series of Poker in Las Vegas, Nevada.

== Poker career ==
=== 2005 World Series of Poker ===
Just prior to entering the 2005 World Series of Poker (WSOP), Hachem visited the Bicycle Casino in Bell Gardens, California, to play in a no-limit Texas hold 'em game. One of the players made a joke that Hachem was stopping in before being crowned the new "Australian champion". Hachem entered the World Series of Poker as a relatively unknown poker player. Two weeks prior to the main event, Hachem finished 10th in the $1,000 buy-in no-limit Hold'em World Series event, winning $25,850.

Hachem won the 2005 WSOP $10,000 no-limit Texas hold 'em Main Event, outlasting 5,618 other players. He won $7,500,000 for the first-place finish, then a record for all-time largest poker tournament prize. He entered the tournament by paying the $10,000 entrance fee in cash. Hachem ended the first day of the tournament with 67,000 in chips, about twice the average, and he said the strong start gave him confidence going into the rest of the tournament. Hachem's chip stack stayed at the tournament average for most of the tournament until he reached the final table, which lasted a record 13 hours and 54 minutes. A number of fellow Australians provided moral support from the audience, chanting "Aussie, Aussie, Aussie, Oi, Oi, Oi!".

Hachem was short-stacked for much of the final table and was constantly being re-raised by professional player Aaron Kanter. With four players left in the hand, Hachem was rejuvenated when he went all in with Q♦ 7♦ against Kanter, who had 9♦ 9♠. Hachem caught a queen on the flop and doubled his chips. In a later interview, Hachem said he knew the hand was a turning point for him. He took the chip lead with three players remaining and after going heads-up against Steve Dannenmann, it took Hachem only six hands to win the game. In the final hand, Hachem called a pre-flop raise from 300,000 to 700,000 chips with 7♣ 3♠, one of the worst starting hands in Texas hold 'em. The flop came 6♥ 5♦ 4♦, giving Hachem a straight. When the turn brought the A♠, Dannenmann made the top pair (with an open-ended straight draw) with his starting hand of A♦ 3♣. Hachem bet, Dannenmann raised, Hachem moved all-in and was called. In the end, Dannenmann could only tie if the river brought a 7 (giving him the same straight), but the 4♣ on the river ensured Hachem the win.

"In Australia, they are really proud of their sports heroes, and winning the "holy grail of poker" is a big coup for the country. I really wanted to win, not just for myself, but for everyone in Australia."

— Joe Hachem

After winning the tournament, Hachem wrapped himself in an Australian flag and shouted, "Thank you, America!". Hachem was the first Australian to win the World Series of Poker Main Event, and he immediately developed a strong fan base in Australia. During a post-tournament interview, WSOP commentator Norman Chad declared, "Hachem turned 7–3 offsuit into $7.5 million. Pass the sugar!" Hachem himself first used the line, which came to be considered a winning catchphrase after flopping a flush with A♣ 6♣ against Andrew Black's three queens and winning a large pot. (In actuality, Hachem had said "Pass the sugar!" prematurely. Had the board paired in this hand, Black would have had at least a full house, which would have eliminated Hachem.)

Hachem and his World Series main event win has been credited with consolidating the boom in popularity for poker in Australia and beyond (which was first thrust into the mainstream consciousness by Chris Moneymaker in 2003), including potentially being the impetus for the casino scenes in the 2006 movie Casino Royale; the original gambling action from the original Casino Royale novel was baccarat. Hachem continued playing home games with his friends after his main event victory, including friendly games with George Clooney, Brad Pitt, and Casino Royale star Daniel Craig. In 2008, it was announced that there would be a documentary film produced that was focusing on Hachem's 2005 World Series of Poker victory as well as the eight other players at the main event final table. The resulting 2009 film, Pass the Sugar, was directed by Gil Cates Jr., who previously directed the 2008 poker-themed film Deal.

Also in 2005, Hachem made the final table of a World Series of Poker circuit event at the Bally's Las Vegas Hotel and Casino in Las Vegas. Hachem was the chip leader during much of the final table, but he suffered a crippling setback against Kido Pham, who went all in with Jack-Ten. Hachem called with pocket kings, but lost when two jacks came up on the flop, costing Hachem almost all of his chips. He was eventually eliminated by Lee Watkinson in fifth place, earning Hachem $88,172. After the match, Hachem said, "I came here wanting to avoid making any mistakes. The fact is, I didn't make a mistake. I'm proud of the way I played in this tournament, although it is very painful not to win.

=== 2006 tournaments ===
At the 2006 World Series of Poker, Hachem finished second in the $2,500 short-handed no limit hold 'em event, which drew 1,068 players. During the final hand, Hachem went all in with A♠ Q♣ and was called by Dutch Boyd, who had A♦ 5♥. Although a favorite after the flop of A♥ K♣ 9♠, Hachem lost when Boyd caught a five of diamonds on the river. Hachem won $256,800 from the second-place finish, but was nevertheless visibly disappointed by the outcome, and was comforted by his wife Jeanine and friend Greg Raymer, the 2004 World Series of Poker champion.

Also in the 2006 World Series, Hachem finished fourth in the $2,500 pot limit hold'em tournament, which had a starting field of 562 players. In the final table, Hachem eliminated Lee Grove with a pair of kings and Alex Jacob with three queens. But Hachem was eliminated after once again taking a bad beat on the river. He moved all in against John Gale with K♦ 9♥ on a K♠ 8♥ 4♣ 3♣, against Gale's A♣ 3♦. Gale eliminated Hachem after catching an ace of spades on the river. Hachem earned $90,482 for the fourth-place finish, and Gale eventually won the tournament.

Hachem finished in 238th place at the 2006 World Series Main Event, earning him $42,882. In defense of his 2005 title, Hachem outlasted about 97% of the record field of 8,773 players in the tournament. Hachem was eliminated after his pocket Aces were outdrawn by Andrew Schreibman's pocket Jacks. He was the last remaining Main Event champion left in the field, as Greg Raymer had been the year before.

In December 2006, Hachem won $2,207,575 and his first World Poker Tour title at the Bellagio Casino's Five Diamonds Poker Classic. The victory made Hachem one of only six poker players to win both a World Series of Poker main event and a World Poker Tour championship, along with Doyle Brunson, Carlos Mortensen, Scotty Nguyen, Dan Harrington and Ryan Riess.

=== Other poker events ===
Hachem won the "World Series of Poker Champions II" tournament on NBC's Poker After Dark on a table consisting of Main Event winners Doyle Brunson, Greg Raymer, Jamie Gold, Huck Seed, and Johnny Chan, whom he defeated heads up to win $120,000. In 2006, Hachem appeared in Poker Superstars III, but failed to advance to the Super 16 round by only one point. In December 2007, Hachem won the Poker Stars Asia Pacific Poker Tour Tournament of Champions, which included a field of such players as Raymer, Chris Moneymaker and Isabelle Mercier. In April 2008, Hachem came close to the final table of the PokerStars EPT Monte Carlo Grand Final, finish in 11th place for more than $150,000.

Hachem finished in 103rd place in the 2009 World Series of Poker Main Event, which drew a field of 6,494 players, earning himself $40,288. Also in 2009, Hachem participated in the fifth season of High Stakes Poker, a cash game television series on the Game Show Network. The season featured a buy-in of at least $200,000, the highest minimum requirement in the show's history. Also in 2009, Hachem produced and hosts the Australian reality show The Poker Star, which characterizes Hachem as a poker mentor searching for the next big player. The show features a group of contestants living together in one house and competing in a series of poker-related challenges.

Hachem was inducted into the Australian Poker Hall of Fame in 2009 with "Legend Status", to which he now serves as Chairman.

As of 2024, Hachem's total live tournament winnings exceed $12,900,000, more than $7.9 million of which comes from the World Series of Poker events.

== Poker style and technique ==
Hachem said he believes his discipline and control helps him make good decisions at the right time. He credited his success at the 2005 World Series of Poker in part to his ability to make difficult laydowns. Hachem has also advised amateur players against bluffing too often or without any outs. Hachem said he rarely bluffs without any outs, and only does so when "you're confident the other guy can't stand the heat of a raise." Hachem said he tries to maintain the same poker face for each hand. During intense hands, he focuses on a point on the table, keeps his breathing under control and tries not to give away any information. Hachem has said he likes playing at featured tables in televised poker tournaments because, "Everyone wants to be on TV, and they are afraid to do anything silly so they don't get ridiculed. I try and take advantage of that." Hachem's talent and personality have drawn him a large fanbase, and people often surround his table to watch him during tournaments. Hachem is widely regarded as one of the best high-stakes cash game players in Australia.

== Family and personal life ==
"I hope to help with the journey that playing poker for a living can be respectable. My objective is to let the world know that an ordinary guy with a family can be a poker pro and not be considered a degenerate."

— Joe Hachem

Hachem has been married since 1989 to Jeanie, who he has known since both were teenagers. They have four children, named Anthony, Justine, Daniel, and James. Hachem said his wife was extremely supportive of his decision to seek a career in poker and participate in the World Series of Poker in 2005. His children also play poker, and Hachem said he believes it teaches them discipline and how to handle adversity.

He operates a mortgage company and enjoys playing golf, especially with friends and other poker players.

Until December 2011, Hachem represented the online poker website PokerStars. He played under the name "JoeHachem" on the site.

Actor Matt Damon, who starred in the 1998 poker film Rounders, is a fan of Hachem and has played poker with him. Damon said of Hachem, "Poker can bring out the worst in people, but when you see somebody who's just winning with grace and class and dignity, it's nice."

== Bibliography ==
- Pass the Sugar (2009) ISBN 1-877096-73-3
