= Mark Seif =

American poker player (born 1967)

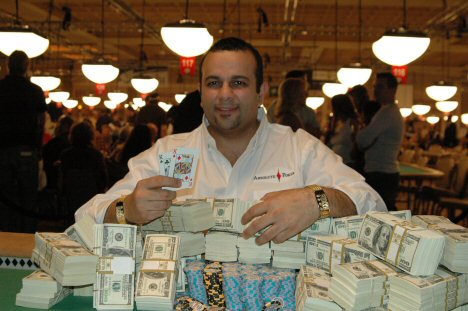
- Seif at the 2005 World Series of Poker
- Born: October 4, 1967 (age 59)

World Series of Poker
- Bracelets: 2
- Money finishes: 10
- Highest WSOP Main Event finish: None

World Poker Tour
- Title: None
- Final tables: 3
- Money finishes: 11

Mark Seif (born October 4, 1967) is an American poker player, California attorney, and TV show host.

== Personal life ==
Seif was born in Cairo, Egypt before moving with his family at the age of two, to Southern California. Seif attended LaSalle High School in Pasadena, California, and graduated in 1985. He then received a bachelor's degree in Economics from UCLA in 1991 and a Juris Doctor in 1997 from Loyola Law School in Los Angeles.

Seif worked for the Los Angeles District Attorney's Office from 1994 to 1996 as a California Supreme Court certified law student practitioner, and assisted in the prosecution of the O. J. Simpson case. Subsequently, in 1997, Seif joined the national labor and employment law firm of Fisher & Phillips in their Newport Beach, California office. There he represented management exclusively in several high-profile sex harassment lawsuits. Seif left the firm in 1999 to become General Counsel of Preferred Capital Corporation, a business financial services firm in Tahoe City, California. In May 2001, Seif quit practicing law to pursue a full-time career as a professional poker player and TV personality.

In 2016, Seif founded PRIME Soccer Club, a competitive sports organization in Southern Nevada, where he serves as executive director. Seif currently resides in Henderson, Nevada and has two daughters, Sarah and Ashley.

== Poker career ==
In May 2001, Seif quit practicing law to play poker full-time. In August 2002, he was one of six finalists at the inaugural World Poker Tour World Poker Tour (WPT) Legends of Poker Championship in Los Angeles, California at the Bicycle Club Casino. Seif finished in fourth place in that tournament that was broadcast several months later across the United States and later internationally.

In May 2003, Seif had his first cash in the World Series of Poker (WSOP) in the $3,000 no limit Texas hold'em event, where he finished in 9th place with a final table that included poker professionals Phil Hellmuth, Daniel Negreanu, and Erik Seidel among others.

Seif is best known for being the only player to win two WSOP bracelets in back-to-back events in 2005 in the $1,500 limit hold'em shootout and the $1,500 no limit hold'em events. He bested a field of 2,013 players to win his second bracelet at a final table that included poker professionals Minh Nguyen, Greg Raymer, Dave Ulliott, and Bill Gazes among others.

Later in 2005, Seif won the United States Poker Championship in seven-card stud at the Taj Majal in Atlantic City, New Jersey. He also made the final table at the PokerStars World Championship of Online Poker that same year.

Seif was a color commentator for the Professional Poker Tour television series which aired on the Travel Channel starting in July 2006 and ended in late 2009. He has been a spokesperson for Absolute Poker since 2004. It is estimated Seif earned in excess of $2 million per year as the public face of Absolutepoker.com, one of the biggest and highest revenue online poker sites in the world until April 15, 2011, when the US Government seized the domain names of the three leading online poker sites including Absolutepoker.com, Fulltiltpoker.com and Pokerstars.com forcing the poker sites to permanently shut down US operations. Several years later, Pokerstars.com re-entered the US market in the state of New Jersey, but with limited success.

As of 2023, Seif's total live tournament winnings exceed $3.4 million. His 77 cashes at WSOP events account for $2,170,965 of those winnings.

=== WSOP bracelets ===
Year	Tournament	Prize
2005	$1,500 Limit Texas hold'em	$181,330
2005	$1,500 No Limit Texas hold'em	$611,145

== Mark Seif Quotes ==
- "There are three ways to play pocket jacks, and they're all wrong."
- "To play great poker, sometimes you've got to go broke."
