= John Barch =

American poker player and businessman

- Nickname: Tex

World Series of Poker
- Bracelet: 1
- Money finishes: 5
- Highest WSOP Main Event finish: 3rd, 2005

World Poker Tour
- Title: None
- Final table: None
- Money finishes: 2

John Derick "Tex" Barch is a businessman and professional poker player from McKinney, Texas whose rise to fame came in the 2005 World Series of Poker. Barch made the final table at the Main Event, finishing third, behind Steve Dannenmann and eventual champion Joe Hachem.

Barch has been playing poker since 1993 and has cashed in fourteen other major tournaments besides the 2005 WSOP. His first cash in a World Series event came on April 27, 2004, in the $1,500 pot limit hold'em event. Barch finished in 16th place, earning $4,000.

At the 2010 World Series of Poker, Barch won his first bracelet, when he won the $1,500 Pot Limit Omaha event. He defeated a final table including previous WSOP bracelet winners Nenad Medic and Blair Rodman. Barch earned a $256,919 cash prize in addition to the bracelet.

As of 2010, his total career live tournament winnings exceed $2,945,000. His five cashes at the WSOP account for $2,846,788 of those winnings.
