= Brian Wilson (poker player) =

American real estate developer and poker player (born 1967)

- Nickname: Rookie
- Born: September 14, 1967 (age 59)

World Series of Poker
- Bracelet: 1
- Money finishes: 2
- Highest WSOP Main Event finish: None

Brian "Rookie" Wilson (born September 14, 1967) is an American real estate developer and poker player, originally from Rockford, Illinois, now based in Fort Myers, Florida.

Wilson won a World Series of Poker bracelet in 2005 in the $5,000 pot limit hold'em event, defeating John Gale in the final heads-up confrontation to take home the $370,685 first prize. This was the first pot limit event Wilson had ever played. He has noted that this was event #20 at the WSOP, started on June 20 and 20 is his lucky number.

Wilson also appeared in the televised William Hill Poker Grand Prix (heat 6). He took second place in the 888.com UK Open and participated in the first Poker Dome show in Las Vegas. In 2007 Wilson Finished 13th in the $5k main event of the Tunica WSOP Circuit event.

Wilson claims to be a disciple of Dave "El Blondie" Colclough, who tutored him in poker after they met in Estonia during September 2004. Wilson has since dyed his hair blonde and become involved with the BlondePoker website.

As of 2008, his total live tournament winnings exceed $680,000. Wilson has done commentary for Bluff radio and the World Series of Poker.
