= Stanley Weiss =

American poker player

- Nickname: None

World Series of Poker
- Bracelet: None
- Money finishes: 3
- Highest WSOP Main Event finish: None

World Poker Tour
- Title: 1
- Final tables: 2
- Money finishes: 2

Stanley Weiss is an American professional poker player residing in Nashville, Tennessee.

In May 2006, Weiss won the World Poker Tour (WPT) fifth season Mirage Poker Showdown and earned $1,084,037. On the final hand he held K♠ 5♦ and outdrew Harry Demetriou's K♥ 6♣ on the river. Weiss had also won a preliminary event at the Mirage Poker Showdown before his WPT victory.

As of 2008, Weiss's total live tournament winnings exceed $1,450,000.
