= Jan Vang Sørensen =

Danish footballer and poker player (born 1960)

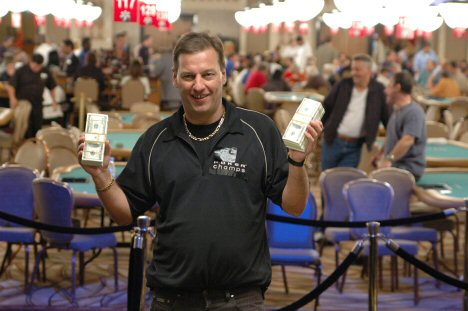
- Sørensen after winning the 2005 World Series of Poker $5,000 seven-card stud event
- Born: Jan Vang Hansen c. 1960 (age 65–66)

World Series of Poker
- Bracelets: 2
- Money finishes: 12
- Highest WSOP Main Event finish: 182nd, 2004

World Poker Tour
- Title: None
- Final table: 1
- Money finishes: 2

European Poker Tour
- Title: None
- Final table: None
- Money finish: 1

Jan Vang Sørensen (born Jan Vang Hansen, c. 1960) is a Danish retired football player, turned professional poker player from Odense. He has won two bracelets at the World Series of Poker.

He legally changed his name from Hansen (his father's surname) to Sørensen (his mother's maiden name) between 2002 and 2005.

== Football career ==
Sørensen played for Odense BK among other clubs.

== Poker career ==
Sørensen first cashed at the World Series of Poker (WSOP) in 1995 with a 16th place finish in a Seven-Card Stud tournament. He went on to win a limit seven-card stud tournament in Dortmund in 1998, winning DM125,000.

At the 2002 WSOP, Sørensen won his first WSOP bracelet in the $2,500 pot limit omaha event, defeating Brent Carter in the final heads-up confrontation to take home the $185,000 first prize.

At the 2004 WSOP, Sørensen made his first money finish in the $10,000 no limit hold'em main event, finishing 182nd. He also cashed in the 2007 WSOP main event, finishing in the money in 602nd place.

At the 2005 WSOP, Sørensen won his second WSOP bracelet in the $5,000 seven-card stud event, winning $293,275 when his (3♥ 9♦) 9♥ 7♥ 8♥ 7♦ (9♠) defeated Keith Sexton's (8♣ K♠) K♦ 3♠ 2♠ J♠ (6♣).

Sørensen has also cashed on the World Poker Tour (WPT), including a final table appearance at the fourth season Doyle Brunson North American Poker Championship, where he finished 5th at a final table also featuring Minh Ly, Dan Harrington and Gavin Smith.

In November 2008, Sørensen won the Master Classics of Poker earning €623,100 (US$800,972) Additionally, Sørensen represented Denmark in the Poker Nations Cup.

As of 2023, his total live tournament winnings exceed $2,300,000.

== World Series of Poker Bracelets ==
| Year | Tournament | Prize (US$) |
|---|---|---|
| 2002 | $2,500 Pot Limit Omaha | $185,000 |
| 2005 | $5,000 Seven Card Stud | $293,275 |
