= Pat Poels =

American poker player

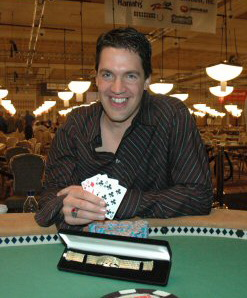
- Poels after winning his first bracelet at the 2005 World Series of Poker
- Born: c. 1968 (age 57–58)

World Series of Poker
- Bracelets: 2
- Money finishes: 11
- Highest WSOP Main Event finish: 253rd, 2005

World Poker Tour
- Money finishes: 2

Patrick Poels (born c. 1968) is an American professional poker player from Mesa, Arizona and a two-time World Series of Poker bracelet winner. He currently leads the engineering team at Snyk as the company's SVP of Engineering, and formerly led engineering for Eventbrite as the company's CTO.

Poels won the 2005 World Series of Poker (WSOP) $1500 Limit Omaha Hi-Low Split 8 or Better event earning $270,100, defeating two-time bracelet winner John Lukas in the heads-up play. Then a year later he won his second bracelet in the $1,000 Seven Card Stud Hi-Low Split 8 or Better event. event.

As of 2009, his total live tournament winnings exceed $900,000.

== World Series of Poker bracelets ==
Year	Event	Prize Money
2005	$1,500 Limit Omaha Hi-Low Split 8 or Better	$270,100
2006	$1,000 7 Card Stud Hi-Low Split 8 or Better	$172,091
