= The Poker Star =

2009 Australian reality TV series

- Genre: Reality; Game show
- Created by: Joe Hachem
- Presented by: Joe Hachem
- Country of origin: Australia
- Original language: English
- No. of seasons: 1
- No. of episodes: 8

Production
- Running time: 60 minutes

Original release
- Network: One
- Release: 26 September – 18 November 2009

The Poker Star is an Australian reality game show broadcast on One from 26 September 2009. It is created and hosted by former World Series of Poker Champion Joe Hachem, who will also act as judge and mentor to the contestants. New Zealand poker champion Lee Nelson will also appear as a judge. The series is sponsored by PokerStars.

The show pits eleven amateur poker players against each other in a series of challenges that tests the principles of "Joe's Code", rules that Hachem believes are beneficial for success in life and for being a successful poker player. Players compete for $100,000 in cash and entry to four of the world's biggest poker tournaments, with Hachem continuing to join them as their personal mentor.

Over 18,000 people applied for the first series.

The 1st season saw 33-year-old speech pathologist and mother of two Amanda become 'The Poker Star', beating out the other two members of the final three, Josh and Chris. Amanda stated during the final episode that the $100,000 prize money would go a long way to helping with the mortgage on the home she had recently purchased for herself and her two daughters.

== Players ==
Candidate	Age	State	Result
Amanda – speech pathologist	33	Victoria	The Poker Star
Josh – lawyer	27	Victoria	Eliminated in the Season Finale
Chris – student	26	Victoria	Eliminated in the Season Finale
Ben – creative director	37	Victoria	Eliminated in week 7
Donna – marketing executive	29	New South Wales	Eliminated in week 6
Shane – sales consultant	26	New South Wales	Eliminated in week 6
Katie – homemaker	26	Victoria	Eliminated in week 5
Ron – retired	60	Queensland	Eliminated in week 4
Sally – bookmaker	23	New South Wales	Eliminated in week 3
Martin – fireman	48	New South Wales	Eliminated in week 2
Tom – bar owner	26	Victoria	Eliminated in week 1

== Weekly results ==
Elimination Chart
Candidate	1	2	3	4	5	6	7	8	Winnings
Amanda	9th	$1,500	2nd	7th*	3rd	last	2nd*	2nd	$1,500
Josh	exempt*	8th	7th	4th	$3,000	$5,000*	$7,500*	5th**	$15,500
Chris	7th	7th*	last	$2,500*	last	3rd	3rd*	$10,000	$12,500
Ben	$1,000	3rd	$2,000	5th	6th	2nd	last*		$3,000
Donna	4th	9th	8th*	2nd*	4th	4th			-
Shane	3rd	5th	6th	6th*	2nd	5th			-
Katie	last	4th	5th	last	5th*				-
Ron	2nd	last	3rd	3rd					-
Sally	8th	2nd	4th						-
Martin	6th	6th							-
Tom	5th								-

* The player(s) won the weekly challenge.
** Invited to play were professional poker players Eric Assoudourian (3rd), Celina Lin (4th) and Emad Tahtouh (last).

The player became The Poker Star.
The player was sent to the elimination room.
The player was eliminated.

== Weekly summary ==
=== Week 1: "Reading People" ===
- Air date: 30 September 2009 (special advance screening: 26 September 2009)
- Challenge: The contestants get to know each other and must decide who is the strongest player and who is the weakest player.
- Challenge winner: Josh
- Tournament winner: Ben ($1,000)
- Eliminated: Tom

=== Week 2: "Focus" ===
- Air date: 7 October 2009
- Challenge: The contestants must maintain their focus in the shark tank at the Melbourne Aquarium.
- Challenge winner: Chris
- Tournament winner: Amanda ($1,500)
- Eliminated: Martin

=== Week 3: "Bluffing" ===
- Air date: 14 October 2009
- Challenge: The contestants must bluff their way through a job interview with the "human lie detector".
- Challenge winner: Donna
- Tournament winner: Ben ($2,000)
- Eliminated: Sally

=== Week 4: "Composure" ===
- Air date: 21 October 2009
- Challenge: The contestants must maintain their composure as they build a house of cards whilst listening to loud music.
- Challenge winner: Red team (Amanda, Chris, Donna, Shane)
- Tournament winner: Chris ($2,500)
- Eliminated: Ron

=== Week 5: "Recall" ===
- Air date: 28 October 2009
- Challenge: The contestants must recall a series of events they witnessed which includes a car accident.
- Challenge winner: Katie
- Tournament winner: Josh ($3,000)
- Eliminated: Katie

=== Week 6: "Endurance" ===
- Air date: 4 November 2009
- Challenge: The contestants are put in front of a screen with a blinking eye and must record every time the eye blinks.
- Challenge winner: Josh
- Tournament winner: Josh ($5,000)
- Eliminated: Donna, Shane

=== Week 7: "Courage" ===
- Air date: 11 November 2009
- Challenge: The contestants get to live the high-life by walking across a thin plank of wood between two buildings, 16 floors above the ground.
- Challenge winner: Amanda, Ben, Chris, Josh
- Tournament winner: Josh ($7,500)
- Eliminated: Ben

=== Week 8: "Charisma" ===
- Air date: 18 November 2009
- Challenge: The contestants are brought to a press conference where they have to answer questions on the spot from a team of reporters.
- Challenge winner: No challenge winner
- Tournament winner: Chris ($10,000)
- Eliminated: Josh, Chris
- The Poker Star: Amanda
