= Steve Dannenmann =

American poker player (born 1966)

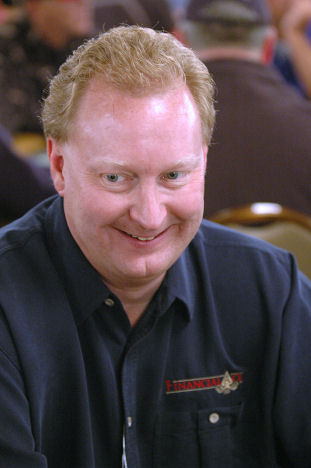
- Steve Dannenmann at the 2005 WSOP
- Nickname: Taxman
- Born: August 15, 1966 (age 60)

World Series of Poker
- Bracelet: None
- Money finishes: 8
- Highest WSOP Main Event finish: 2nd, 2005

World Poker Tour
- Title: None
- Final table: None
- Money finishes: 3

Steven Paul "Steve" Dannenmann (born August 15, 1966, in Baltimore, Maryland) is a CPA from Severn, Maryland who gained attention in the poker world for his success in the 2005 World Series of Poker, finishing runner-up to Joe Hachem in the Main Event in his first attempt. He won $4,250,000 as the result of this second place finish.

== Accounting career ==
Dannenmann has been a certified public accountant, financial advisor in his own firm since 1991.

After his second place Main Event finish, Dannenmann said that he would not quit his job because it has taken a long time to establish his business and finds much passion advising his clients to make sound financial decisions.

== Poker career ==
Arriving as a fresh face on the poker scene, during one WSOP segment he claimed to be merely "the fourth best player in his home game" prior to his entry in the Main Event. In fact the 2005 WSOP Main Event was his very first recorded tournament cash. Before this, he mainly played in his home game with friends. He did not want to pay the entire main event fee himself so he split the $10,000 entry fee 50/50 with his friend Jerry Ditzel. After finishing 2nd in the Main Event, Dannenmann split the $4,250,000 prize with him.

Dannenmann feels that Dan Harrington's book on the end-game of No Limit Hold-Em tournaments helped him greatly with his success. He read volume II just days before playing. On the way to second place, he knocked out 1994 WSOP champion Russ Hamilton and Mike Matusow.

His finish in the main event qualified him for the 2005 WSOP Tournament of Champions, where he finished in fifth place and won $100,000. During the final table, he lambasted Phil Hellmuth Jr for his behaviour toward the tournament director by refusing to stack his chips and purposely and continuously slowing the tournament down.

Dannenmann considers himself to be superstitious. He refuses to ride in a cab unless the cab ended in an even number that year, wore the same shirt 7 days in a row during the tournament, and used his lucky globe as a card protector.

In the press conference after the WSOP Main Event, Dannenmann said that he found that playing poker for seven consecutive days for 12–14 hours to be boring, which led to criticism from some professionals.

He has also competed on the World Poker Tour and has cashed in two events. His highest WPT cash was $65,000 for his 11th-place finish in the 2008 Borgata Poker Open tournament in Atlantic City, New Jersey.

As of 2019, his total live tournament winnings exceed $4,900,000.
