= Fisher & Phillips =

Law firm in several US states and Mexico

Fisher Phillips, LLP
- Headquarters: Atlanta, Georgia
- No. of offices: 47
- No. of attorneys: 800+
- Major practice areas: All areas of labor law and employment law
- Date founded: 1943
- Founder: Walter "Ike" Fisher
- Company type: Limited liability partnership
- Website: fisherphillips.com

Fisher Phillips, LLP is an American law firm representing management in the areas of labor, employment, civil rights, corporate compliance and governance, data security, employee benefits, and immigration law. The firm has 47 offices with more than 800 attorneys. The firm’s headquarters are in Atlanta, with offices in most major U.S. cities. In 2023, the firm expanded to Mexico through its international practice group, and in 2025 expanded to Asia, opening an office in Tokyo, Japan.

The firm was founded in 1943 in Atlanta by I. Walter Fisher, with Erle Phillips joining in 1949. It was one of the first in the U.S. to focus its practice on representing employers in labor and employment matters.
