= Quinn Do =

Vietnamese-American poker player (born 1975)

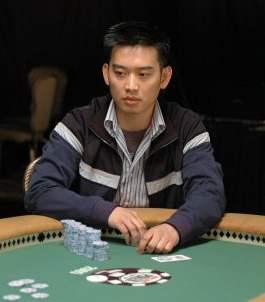
- Do at the 2005 World Series of Poker
- Nickname: Mighty Quinn
- Born: October 9, 1975 (age 51); Vietnam

World Series of Poker
- Bracelets: 2
- Money finishes: 15

World Poker Tour
- Final table: 1
- Money finishes: 3

European Poker Tour
- Money finishes: 2

Quinn Do (born October 9, 1975) is an American professional poker player, a restaurant owner, and a World Series of Poker bracelet winner with multiple live tournament results adding up to over $2.5 million in career earnings.

== Early life and career ==
Do was born in Vietnam and raised in Seattle, Washington after his family moved to the United States when he was 11 years old, Quinn majored in criminology at the University of Washington but he decided to quit college and went on to own two Vietnamese restaurant one located in Seattle and the other in the Metropolitan area of Los Angeles.

== World Series of Poker ==
Do has 15 money finishes at the World Series of Poker (WSOP), including three final tables. On June 16 at the 2005 World Series of Poker he finished 5th in the $1,500 Limit Hold'em Shootout event, earning $34,465. Two days later, he won his first WSOP bracelet, earning an additional $265,975 in the $2,500 Limit Hold'em event.

=== World Series of Poker bracelets ===
Year	Event	Prize Money
2005	$2,500 Limit Hold'em	$265,975
2015	$10,000 Dealers Choice Championship	$319,792

== World Poker Tour ==
Do has three World Poker Tour (WPT) cashes, including a final table where he finished runner-up to Phil Ivey at the WPT 2008 L.A. Poker Classic in Los Angeles, California, earning $909,400.

== Other poker events ==
Prior to becoming a WPT event in 2007, Do finished runner-up to Amnon Filippi at the first Bellagio Challenge Cup, earning $228,850, the final table including such notable names such as Jeff Shulman, Mimi Tran, Sam Grizzle, Scotty Nguyen, and Spider-Man famed actor Tobey Maguire, who finished in 8th place.

Do won the $3,000 No Limit Hold'em event at the Fourth Annual Five Diamond World Poker Classic in 2005 and finished 4th in the $1,500 No Limit Hold'em event at the Festa Al Lago V in 2006.

As of 2015, his total live tournament winnings exceed $2,500,000.
