= Anthony Reategui =

American poker player

Anthony Reatgui
- Nickname: None

World Series of Poker
- Bracelet: 1
- Money finishes: 5
- Highest WSOP Main Event finish: None

World Poker Tour
- Title: None
- Final table: None
- Money finishes: 2

Anthony Reategui is a professional poker player from Chandler, Arizona. A graduate from Chandler High School, Anthony worked at a Mesa, Arizona car washing facility before his poker career. He most notably was the runner-up in the $2,500 No Limit Hold'em event and won the $1,500 No Limit Hold'em Shootout at the 2006 World Series of Poker.

As of 2026, his total live tournament winnings exceed $1,700,000. His 12 cashes at the WSOP account for $829,292 of those winnings.
