= Eric Haber =

American poker player (born 1967)

- Nickname: Sheets
- Born: January 11, 1967 (age 59); Syosset, New York

World Series of Poker
- Money finishes: 3

World Poker Tour
- Money finishes: 4

Eric "Sheets" Haber (born January 11, 1967) is an American professional poker player and hedge fund manager from Syosset, New York.

== Life and career ==
In the world of online poker, the top professionals are often known primarily by their screen-names. Haber's real name is well known, but he is still known as "sheets" to millions of poker players who first encountered him on the Internet.

Haber is the lead instructor, along with Cliff "JohnnyBax" Josephy, at PokerXFactor.com, an online poker training center that features videos of professional players as they play poker online.

Josephy and Haber backed 2009 World Series of Poker Main Event Champion Joe Cada in his $10,000 buy-in run that earned him $8,546,435, half of which went to his backers.

On March 13, 2008, Haber won the $5,150 No Limit Hold'em World Series of Poker circuit Championship Event, winning $431,136.

As of 2008, his total live tournament winnings exceeded $890,000, and his online tournament winnings exceed $2,000,000.
