= Toto Leonidas =

Philippine-born American poker player (born 1960)

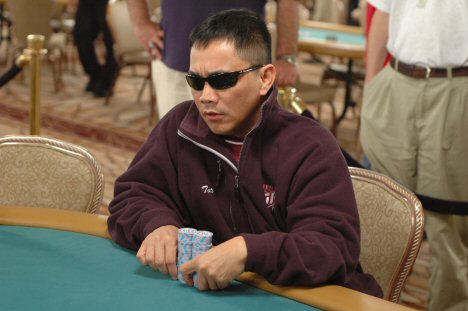
- Leonidas in 2005 World Series of Poker
- Nickname: The Ripper
- Born: October 10, 1960 (age 66); Bacolod, Philippines

World Series of Poker
- Bracelet: 1
- Money finishes: 24

World Poker Tour
- Final table: 1
- Money finishes: 5

Alfredo C. "Toto" Leonidas (born October 10, 1960 in Bacolod, Philippines) is an American poker player with over $3,500,000 in live tournament lifetime winnings as of 2023. His 24 WSOP cashes account for $812,218 of those winnings.

In the 2003 World Series of Poker, Leonidas won a World Series of Poker bracelet for $98,760 in a seven-card stud event. He also won the United States Poker Championship that same year at a final table that contained the likes of Erik Seidel, Phil Hellmuth and John Hennigan.

In 2009, Leonidas made it to his first final table on the World Poker Tour, at the Bicycle Casino Legends of Poker Event. He finished in fourth place, earning $144,600 in the tournament won by Prahlad Friedman.

Leonidas currently resides in Glendale, California.

== World Series of Poker Bracelet ==
Year	Tournament	Prize (US$)
2003	$1,500 Seven Card Stud	$98,760
