= Vinny Vinh =

Vietnamese-American poker player

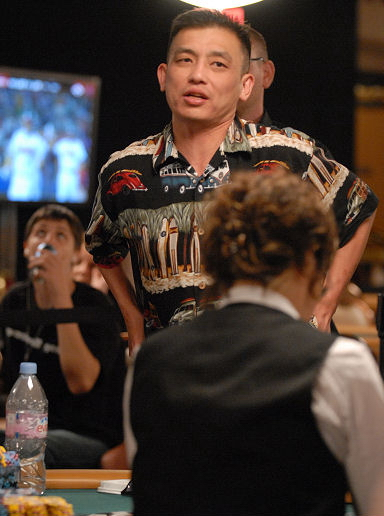
- Vinny Vinh at the 2007 World Series of Poker.

World Series of Poker
- Bracelet: None
- Money finishes: 7
- Highest WSOP Main Event finish: None

World Poker Tour
- Title: None
- Final table: 1
- Money finishes: 3

Quoc Al "Vinny" Vinh is a Vietnamese American professional poker player with over $2.4 million in tournament winnings, who became well known at the 2007 World Series of Poker while playing in the $1,000 buy-in No Limit Hold'em event, when he failed to return on the second day of play as the chip leader with enough chips that even after blinding out he finished in the money in 20th place for $16,212.

== Poker career ==
=== World Series of Poker ===
Vinh has seven cashes at the World Series of Poker (WSOP), including three Final Tables, he finished runner-up to Rafi Amit at the 2005 World Series of Poker in the $10,000 Pot Limit Omaha event, earning $282,280; 8th place at the 2005 World Series of Poker $5,000 No Limit Hold'em event for $87,702 and 3rd place at the 2008 World Series of Poker $1,500 Limit Hold'em event for $99,099.

=== World Poker Tour ===
Vinh has three cashes in World Poker Tour (WPT) championship events, with his highest to date as runner-up to Antonio Esfandiari at the $9,900 No Limit Hold'em Championship at the WPT 2004 L.A. Poker Classic, earning $718,485.

=== Other Poker events ===
Vinh has at least ten first place victories in live tournament poker events, including winning the 2005 World Series of Poker circuit event at Caesars - Indiana after defeating Men "The Master" Nguyen during heads-up play, earning $437,760.

As of 2010, his total live tournament winnings exceed $2,500,000. His 7 cashes as the WSOP account for $511,061 of those winnings.
