= Mike Matusow =

American poker player

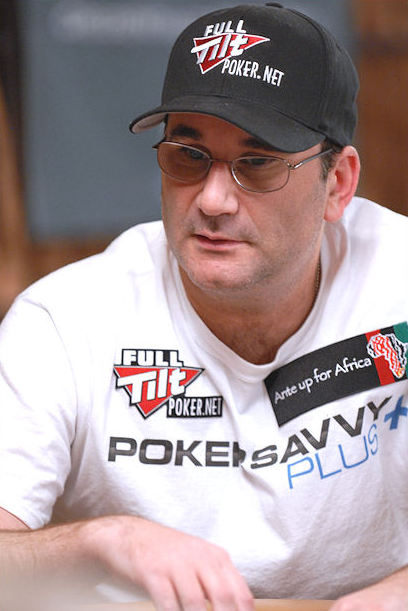
- Matusow at the 2008 World Series of Poker
- Nickname: The Mouth
- Born: April 30, 1968 (age 58); Los Angeles, California, U.S.

World Series of Poker
- Bracelets: 4
- Final tables: 27
- Money finishes: 115
- Highest WSOP Main Event finish: 6th, 2001

World Poker Tour
- Title: None
- Final tables: 10
- Money finishes: 15

Michael Matusow (born April 30, 1968) is an American professional poker player residing in Henderson, Nevada. Matusow's nickname of "the Mouth" reflects his reputation for trash-talking at the poker table.

Matusow began playing poker seriously in the early 1990s, first while working as a poker dealer, then as a professional player. His successes include being a four-time World Series of Poker bracelet winner and the winner of the 2005 World Series of Poker Tournament of Champions.

== Early years ==
Matusow was born in Los Angeles, California. He was first introduced to poker when he played video poker at the Maxim Casino at the age of 18. He was a regular and played so much that he suffered from repetitive strain injury in his shoulders and arms. He occasionally stole money from his mother's purse and at one point attended Gamblers Anonymous meetings. Matusow was taught Texas hold 'em in 1989 by a rounder named Steve Samaroff.

== Poker career ==
At the 1998 World Series of Poker (WSOP), Matusow paid part of Scotty Nguyen's entrance fee into a satellite event for the $10,000 no limit Texas hold 'em Main Event. Nguyen went on to win, and gave $333,333 to Matusow in return for his partial stake. In 1999, Matusow won his first WSOP bracelet, winning the $3,500 No Limit Hold'em event defeating Alex Brenes heads-up to win the title.

In 2001, he finished 6th place in the WSOP $10,000 no limit Hold 'em main event. Matusow says that the decisive hand was when he was bluffed by eventual champion Juan Carlos Mortensen, but did not trust his instincts to call.

At the 2002 WSOP, Matusow won his second bracelet by winning the $5,000 Omaha Hi-Low Split 8 or Better event. He defeated fellow professional poker player Daniel Negreanu to win the tournament.

In the 2005 WSOP, Matusow finished 9th out of 5,619 players in the main event, winning $1,000,000. Several months later, he won the WSOP Tournament of Champions in a heads-up battle against Hoyt Corkins, earning another $1,000,000 in the process, making him the first player to win two million dollar prizes in the same year. He also placed third in the Tournament of Champions the following year, winning $250,000.

At the 2008 World Series of Poker, Matusow won a third bracelet in the $5000 No Limit 2–7 Draw with rebuys event defeating Jeff Lisandro heads up for the $537,862 first prize. Later in the same year he finished 30th out of 6,844 players in the Main Event, making yet another deep run in the Main Event.

Matusow won his fourth bracelet in 2013 in the $5,000 Seven Card Stud Hi-Lo Split 8 or Better tournament, defeating Matthew Ashton heads-up and earning $266,503.

=== World Series of Poker bracelets ===
| Year | Event | Prize money |
|---|---|---|
| 1999 | $3,500 No Limit Hold 'em | $265,475 |
| 2002 | $5,000 Omaha Hi-Low Split 8 or Better | $148,520 |
| 2008 | $5,000 No Limit 2–7 Draw w/Rebuys | $537,862 |
| 2013 | $5,000 Seven Card Stud Hi-Lo Split 8 or Better | $266,503 |

=== Other poker ventures ===
In October 2004, Matusow made his first World Poker Tour (WPT) final table at the UltimateBet Aruba Classic, earning $250,000 for 3rd place. In 2006, he finished runner-up to Tony G in the WPT Bad Boys of Poker II in heads-up play. Matusow also appeared in Poker Superstars III, where he made it to the Elite Eight. In the winner-take-all championship match, Matusow beat seven other players to win $500,000. He also appeared in the second, third, fourth, and sixth season of High Stakes Poker. In September 2006, Mike made his debut on the European Poker Tour (EPT) in Barcelona; however, he was eliminated on the first day. In early 2007, Matusow appeared on two episodes of Poker After Dark where he finished 3rd and 2nd respectively. He plays online poker under the following aliases: "dill pickle" (UltimateBet); "mrpokejoke" (PokerStars); and "Mike Matusow" (Full Tilt Poker, where he was formerly a member of "Team Full Tilt").

In July 2007, Matusow won $671,320 after coming in second place at the World Poker Tour Bellagio Cup III Championship after online pro Kevin Saul defeated him during heads-up play. On November 11, 2008, at the World Poker Tour Foxwoods World Poker Finals, Matusow made another WPT final table, He was eliminated after his A♠ J♥ didn't improve against Jonathan Little's hand of 9♥ 9♠, he finished in 6th place, earning $124,048.

In 2013, Matusow won the NBC National Heads-Up Poker Championship, defeating Phil Hellmuth 2–1 in the final.

As of July 2023, his total live tournament winnings exceed $10,000,000. $3,580,911 of his winnings have come at the WSOP.

== Personal life ==
Matusow resides in Henderson, Nevada. He is Jewish. He often wears a gold chain with the Hebrew symbol 'chai' around his neck. Additionally, Matusow hosted Card Player's poker radio show/podcast, the Circuit, before being replaced by Gavin Smith and Joe Sebok. He was also the host of Card Player's now defunct online video segment, "The Mouthpiece." In one episode, Mike discussed the controversial Ultimatebet.com superuser cheating scandal, as well as seeking legal action as a victim of the scandal against the main perpetrator, former World Series of Poker Champion Russ Hamilton.

Matusow has had several personal problems. He has battled drug issues, including a six-month stint in jail in 2004 and 2005 after being caught providing ecstasy and prescription painkillers to an undercover police officer. After several months of an official Las Vegas Metro Police "Sting Operation", Matusow was arrested and charged with six category A Felonies, all drug related. A plea deal was later reached where Matusow was incarcerated in the Clark County Detention Center for six months.

Matusow wrote an autobiography titled Check Raising the Devil that was released May 12, 2009.
