= Paul McKinney =

American poker player (1925–2013)

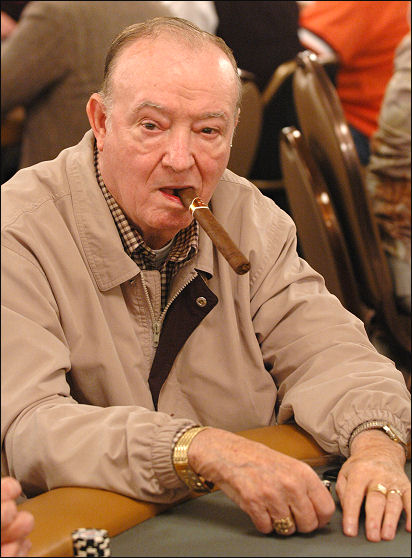
- McKinney at the 2006 World Series of Poker
- Nickname: Cigar

World Series of Poker
- Bracelet: 1
- Money finishes: 11
- Highest WSOP Main Event finish: 9th, 1998

World Poker Tour
- Title: None
- Final table: None
- Money finishes: 2

Paul "Cigar" McKinney (January 6, 1925, in Princeton, West Virginia – July 6, 2013) was an American poker player who won a World Series of Poker bracelet at the age of 80.

== Poker career ==
McKinney, who won the 2005 World Series of Poker $1,000 Seniors No Limit Hold'em event (an event that is open to players who are at least aged 50), became the second-oldest person to win a WSOP event (80; Johnny Moss won the 1988 World Series of Poker $1,500 Ace to Five Draw event on his 81st birthday), on his bio sheet for the World Series of Poker he listed his hobbies as "moonshine, cigars and young women.". McKinney finished 9th in the 1998 World Series of Poker Main Event. He has twice also made the final table of the United States Poker Championship, held at the Taj Mahal in Atlantic City, N.J., in 1996 and 1998.

His lifetime tournament winnings exceeded $530,000. His 9 cashes at the WSOP account for $363,030 of those winnings.

=== World Series of Poker Bracelet ===
Year	Tournament	Prize (US$)
2005	$1,000 Seniors No Limit Hold'em	$202,725

== Gambling raid ==
McKinney along with 18 other players were arrested on November 2, 2007, in the Colonial Heights community in Kingsport, Tennessee in the raid the police seize $19,900 in cash.

== Personal life ==
McKinney was the grandfather of Josh McKinney, a long-term member of the United States men's national cerebral palsy soccer team.
