= Josh Arieh =

American poker player (born 1974)

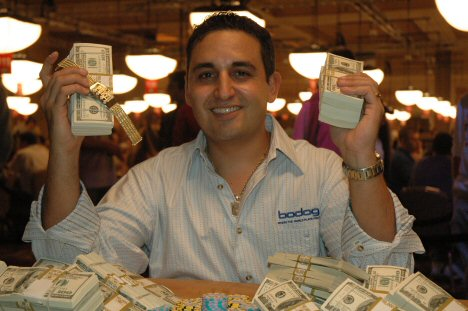
- Arieh in the 2005 World Series of Poker
- Nickname: POY
- Born: September 26, 1974 (age 52)

World Series of Poker
- Bracelets: 7
- Money finishes: 67
- Highest WSOP Main Event finish: 3rd, 2004

World Poker Tour
- Title: None
- Final tables: 2
- Money finishes: 10

European Poker Tour
- Title: None
- Final table: None
- Money finish: 1

Josh Arieh (born September 26, 1974, in Rochester, New York) is an American professional poker player. Arieh has been competing in poker competitions since 1999.

== Tournament history ==
Arieh finished in third place for $2,500,000 in the 2004 World Series of Poker (WSOP) Main Event. He has a World Series of Poker title in Limit Texas hold 'em in 1999 and a 2nd-place finish at the 2000 World Series of Poker Pot Limit Omaha event to Johnny Chan. At the 2005 World Series of Poker, he won his second bracelet by defeating Chris Ferguson in a Pot Limit Omaha event. Arieh finished runner-up in the 2014 World Series of Poker $5,000 No Limit Hold'em - Eight Handed (Event #35).

At 2021 World Series of Poker, Arieh won two bracelets to give him four for his career. He finished ahead of Phil Hellmuth to earn the WSOP Player of the Year honors.

At the 2023 WSOP, Arieh won two bracelets in the $10,000 Limit Hold'em Championship Event and the $25,000 H.O.R.S.E. Event.

As of 2023, Arieh is one of only four people to have finished 3rd place or better in the World Series of Poker Main Event, as well as finish 2nd place or better in the 2019 $50,000 buy-in The Poker Players Championship WSOP event. The other three players to do so in both events, are Poker Hall of Famers: Scotty Nguyen, Phil Hellmuth, and Michael Mizrahi, who won both at the 2025 World Series of Poker.

Through the 2023 World Series of Poker, Arieh has won six World Series of Poker bracelets, won in three different decades, he has finished runner up in 3 different WSOP events, and he has made it to over 20 World Series of Poker final tables.

In May 2006, he won the Calvin Ayre Wild Card Poker Tournament in San Jose for $500,000.

Arieh has made two final tables on the World Poker Tour. He also has several other tournament victories and final table television appearances.

As of June 2026, his total live tournament winnings exceed $14.8 million. Most of his tournament winnings, over $9,000,000, have come at the World Series of Poker.

== Personality ==
Arieh has the reputation as something of a divisive figure, often relying on verbal bullying when trying to force a hand. He has earned the friendship and respect of many of his competitors, but has also committed several faux pas during his career, lambasting Harry Demetriou after an important hand in the Main Event of the 2004 World Series of Poker and, after being eliminated from that tournament, pulling one of the remaining players (David Williams) aside and whispering a censored remark referring to the other remaining opponent, eventual champion Greg Raymer. He subsequently apologized after both incidents.

Arieh is friends with former professional baseball player John Smoltz. Arieh was Smoltz's caddy when Smoltz attempted to qualify for the U.S. Open Championship in 2010.

== World Series of Poker bracelets ==
Year	Tournament	Prize (US$)
1999	$3,000 Limit Hold'em	$202,800
2005	$2,000 Pot Limit Omaha	$381,600
2021	$1,500 Pot Limit Omaha	$204,766
2021	$10,000 Pot Limit Omaha Hi-Lo 8 or Better	$484,791
2023	$10,000 Limit Hold'em	$316,226
2023	$25,000 H.O.R.S.E. High Roller	$711,313
2025 O	$500 NLH Ultra Deepstack	$67,656

"O" indicates a bracelet on in a World Series of Poker online event
