= Harry Demetriou =

Greek Cypriot-British poker player (born 1958)

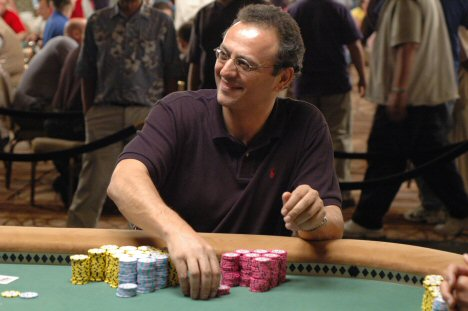
- Demetriou in the 2005 World Series of Poker
- Nickname: The Wise Owl
- Born: 20 August 1958 (age 68)

World Series of Poker
- Bracelet: None
- Money finishes: 10
- Highest WSOP Main Event finish: 18th, 2004

World Poker Tour
- Title: None
- Final tables: 2
- Money finishes: 3

Charidimos (Harry) Demetriou (born 20 August 1958 in London) is a Greek Cypriot-British poker player.

== World Series of Poker ==
Demetriou first became known in poker circles for his 3rd-place finish at the $2,000 no limit Texas hold 'em tournament at the 2002 World Series of Poker (WSOP) won by Layne Flack. Demetriou took home $80,200 for his finish.

He finished in 18th place in the 2004 WSOP Main Event, where he became annoyed with the belligerent attitude of Josh Arieh. Demetriou received $147,500 for his finish in the tournament.

At the 2005 WSOP, he finished as the runner-up in the $2,500 short-handed no limit hold'em event, receiving $163,850 when his Q♣ 9♠ failed to improve in the final hand against Isaac Galazan's K♥ J♠ on a board of 8♦ 5♦ 4♦ 5♠ 2♥. He also made the final table of the same event at the 2006 WSOP, finishing 6th.

Despite his successes at the WSOP, he has made criticisms of disorganisation of events at the 2005 WSOP, the HORSE event at the 2006 WSOP, a change to the format of the 2006 WSOP's shootout event and a rules decision in the 2006 WSOP main event.

== World Poker Tour ==
Demetriou made the final table of the World Poker Tour (WPT) season 2 Invitational event, finishing in fifth place.

Demetriou made a second WPT final table in season 5, finishing runner-up when his K♥ 6♣ was outdrawn by Stanley Weiss' K♠ 5♦.

== Other events ==
In 2003, Demetriou also appeared in the World Heads-Up Poker Championship and Poker Million.

Demetriou won the inaugural Victor Poker Cup in 2004.

As of 2013, his total live tournament winnings exceed $2,100,000. His 10 cashes at the WSOP account for $593,544 of those winnings.
