= Andy Black (poker player) =

Irish poker player (born 1965)

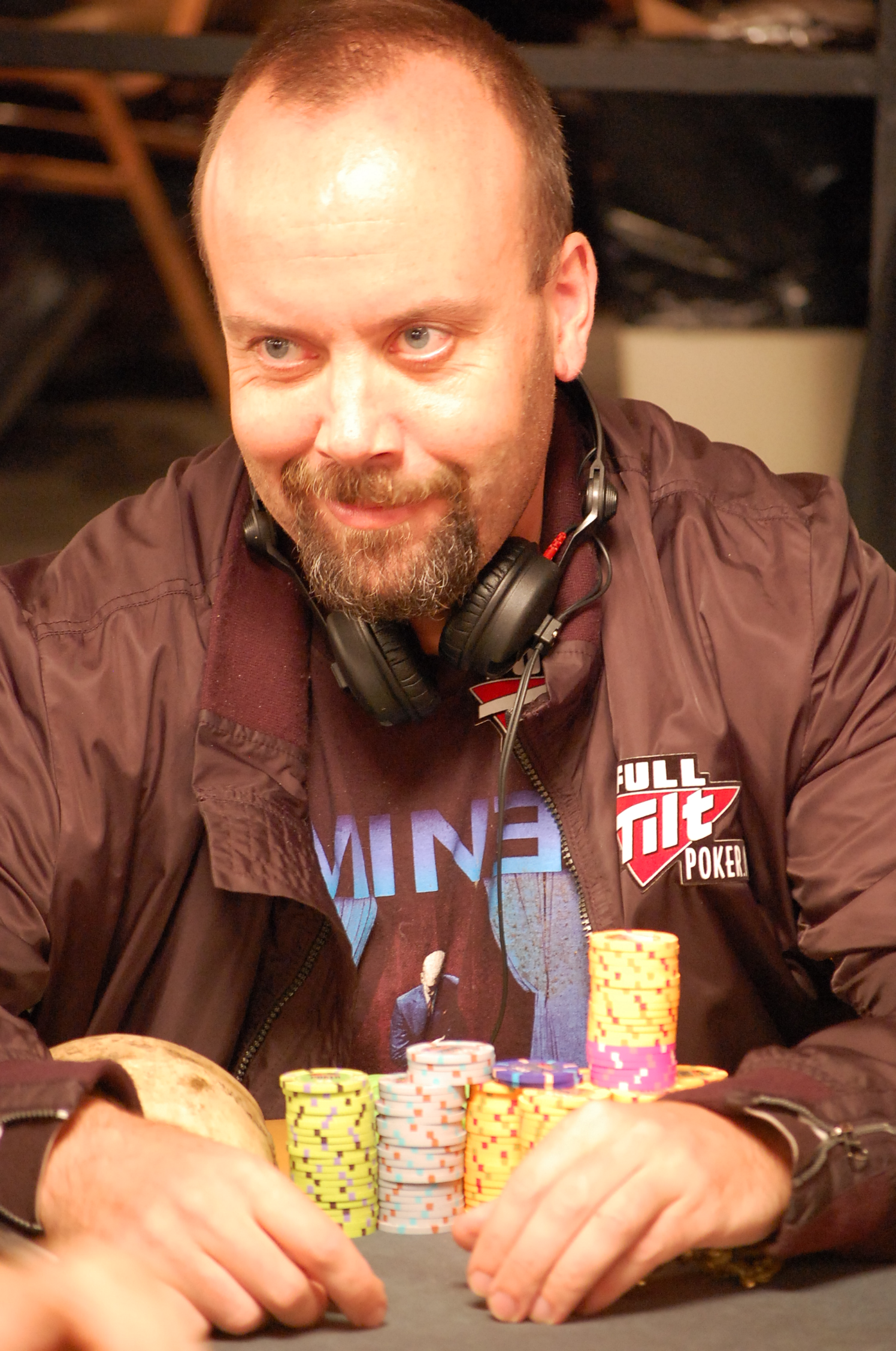
- Andy Black at the 2008 World Series of Poker in Las Vegas
- Nickname: The Monk
- Born: 20 July 1965 (age 61)

World Series of Poker
- Bracelet: None
- Money finishes: 36
- Highest WSOP Main Event finish: 5th, 2005

World Poker Tour
- Title: None
- Final table: None
- Money finishes: 3

European Poker Tour
- Title: None
- Final table: 1
- Money finishes: 5

Andrew Black (born 20 July 1965) is a poker player from Belfast, Northern Ireland, who presently resides in Dublin.

== Early life ==
Black played cards with his mother when he was younger. He began playing more seriously in 1986, whilst he was studying for a law degree at Trinity College, Dublin. Black also began playing in the Griffin Casino in Dublin, reportedly because of the free food and coffee.

== Career ==
Black was knocked out of the 1997 World Series of Poker (WSOP) Main Event by the eventual winner, Stu Ungar. The following year, a documentary titled Million Dollar Deal (narrated by John Hurt) was made of his visit to the same tournament. When he lost that too, he discarded all his possessions, travelled to England and lived in a semi-monastic Buddhist environment for five years.

Black successfully returned to poker in 2004, dominating in Irish tournaments and placing fifth in the 2005 World Series of Poker main event. He led the final table of the main event at one stage holding over one-third of the chips in play; however, he was unable to maintain this lead and finished fifth, winning $1,750,000.

In 2005, he appeared on the chat show Heads Up with Richard Herring to discuss his faith and his poker career. Since the 2005 World Series of Poker main event, he had made a money finish on both the European Poker Tour and the World Poker Tour. In 2006, Black made the final table of the Tournament of Champions, where he once again held a huge chip lead, only to cripple his stack when he overplayed AK and ran into Daniel Negreanu holding pocket Kings. Black once again was eliminated in fifth place, earning $100,000.

Black enjoyed a spectacular start to 2007, placing second for $100,000 in the Pot Limit Omaha event and third in the No Limit Main Event for $700,000, at the Aussie Millions in Melbourne, Australia. At the EPT Grand Final in Monte Carlo, Black once again enjoyed a deep run in a major event, reaching the final table before exiting in seventh for almost $320,000. In 2007, Black won the Pot Limit Omaha side event at the Irish Open.

At the 2007 World Series of Poker, Black finished in the money in two Pot Limit Omaha events, finishing seventh and 11th respectively.

In 2008, Black beat Roland De Wolfe heads-ups to win Premier League Poker II and $250,000. His year continued with a 16th place in the WPT World Poker Classic for $105,525 and three further cash finishes in the WSOP.

Black had deep runs in the Irish Poker Open in 2010–2013, finishing just outside the final table in 10th place in 2011 and in eighth place in 2012. In 2010, he was the subject of RTÉ Radio One's Shuffle Up And Deal. Black joined 616 players at Dublin's Bonnington Hotel for the €230/$248 Amateur Championship of Poker (ACOP) in February 2019, placing first. As of September 2020, his total live tournament winnings exceed $4,885,354. His 36 cashes as the WSOP account for $2,527,162 of those winnings.
