= John Gale (poker player) =

English poker player (1953–2019)

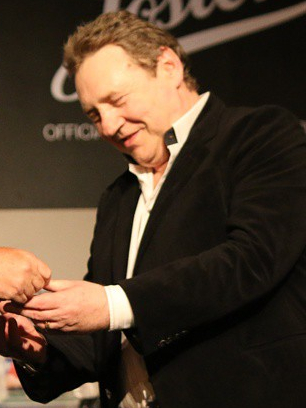
- Gale in 2015
- Nickname: Gentleman
- Born: 13 December 1953; London, England
- Died: 18 November 2019 (aged 65)

World Series of Poker
- Bracelets: 2
- Money finishes: 10
- Highest WSOP Main Event finish: 522nd, 2006

World Poker Tour
- Title: 1
- Final tables: 2
- Money finishes: 4

European Poker Tour
- Title: None
- Final table: None
- Money finishes: 3

John Gale (13 December 1953 – 18 November 2019) was an English professional poker player based in Bushey, Hertfordshire.

Gale started playing Texas hold 'em in mid-2004. He first made a name for himself by qualifying for the World Poker Tour (WPT) 2005 PokerStars Caribbean Poker Adventure tournament in The Bahamas in an online satellite tournament. He went on to win the first place prize of $890,600, outlasting a 461 player field in his first major live tournament.

Upon returning to his management consultant job, he found less of an interest in day-to-day activities and sold the business to concentrate on poker full-time.

Gale finished in the money on the European Poker Tour the next month, and finished in the money four times during the 2005 World Series of Poker, including a second-place finish to Brian Wilson in the $5,000 pot limit hold 'em event. He also made it through to day 2 of the $10,000 no limit hold 'em main event.

At the 2006 WSOP, Gale won Event #29 (a $2,500 Pot Limit Hold'em event) when his K♣ 9♠ defeated Maros Lechman's A♠ 6♠ on a board of T♣ 9♦ 7♣ 5♠ 2♣ in the final hand. Gale was awarded $374,849 along with a WSOP bracelet.

During the 2015 WSOP, Gale won Event #18 (a $1,000 Turbo No Limit Hold'em event). He secured the victory over Gary Luther in heads-up play when he was re-raised all in pre-flop holding 2♣ 2♥ versus Luther's A♣ 3♠. Gale called and the board ran out 8♥ 4♥ 4♦ 10♠ 9♣ giving him the winning hand. He was awarded $298,290 and his second WSOP bracelet.

As of 2015, his total live tournament winnings exceed $3,600,000. His 10 cashes as the WSOP account for $954,900 of those winnings.

Gale died on 18 November 2019 at the age of 65.
