= Rafi Amit =

Israeli poker player

Rafi Amit רפי אמית
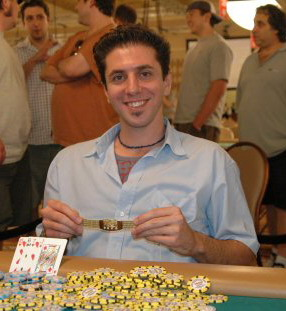
- Amit shows his gold WSOP bracelet after his win in the 2005 World Series of Poker

World Series of Poker
- Bracelets: 2
- Money finishes: 8
- Highest WSOP Main Event finish: None

Rafi Amit (Hebrew: רפי אמית) is an Israeli professional poker player, from Holon.

Amit has won two bracelets at the World Series of Poker, the first in the 2005 Pot limit Omaha event and the second in 2007 in the $1,000 Deuce to Seven Triple Draw Lowball with rebuys event.

As of 2009, his total live tournament winnings exceed $940,000. His eight cashes at the WSOP account for $941,988 of those winnings.

== World Series of Poker Bracelets ==
Year	Tournament	Prize (US$)
2005	$10,000 Pot Limit Omaha	$511,835
2007	$1,000 Deuce to Seven Triple Draw Lowball w/rebuys	$227,005
