= Darrell Dicken =

American poker player (born 1977)

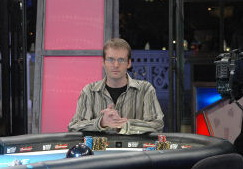
- Dicken at the Fourth Annual Five Diamonds WPT Championship.
- Nickname: Gigabet
- Born: June 18, 1977 (age 49)

World Series of Poker
- Bracelet: None
- Money finishes: 8
- Highest WSOP Main Event finish: 323rd, 2007

World Poker Tour
- Title: None
- Final tables: 2
- Money finishes: 7

Darrell T. Dicken (born June 18, 1977) is an American professional poker player from Waterloo, Iowa, who has cashed at seven World Poker Tour championship events, making the final 6-handed table in two of them.

Dicken known for being an online top ranked professional tournament player under the screen name "Gigabet."

In live tournament poker, Dicken has cashed several times among his largest cashes have been the WPT Five Diamond World Poker Classic $15,000 Main Event where he finished 5th for $241,495, winning the $10,000 No Limit Hold'em WSOP Circuit Championship earning $372,780, winning $169,917 at the Foxwoods Poker Classic in 2007, and 3rd at the WPT's Mirage Poker Showdown in 2007 winning $259,369.

In April 2008, Dicken won the $2,500 No Limit Hold'em event at the Sixth Annual Five Star World Poker Classic, earning $248,800.

As of 2008, Dicken's total live tournament winnings exceed $1,800,000
