= Cliff Josephy =

American poker player

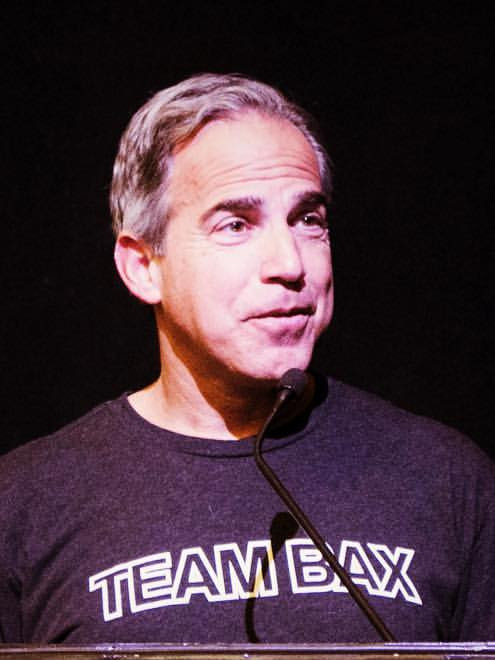
- Josephy in 2016
- Nickname: JohnnyBax

World Series of Poker
- Bracelets: 2
- Money finishes: 18
- Highest WSOP Main Event finish: 3rd, 2016

World Poker Tour
- Title: None
- Final tables: 2
- Money finishes: 11

Cliff D. Josephy is an American professional poker player from Muttontown, New York.

== Life and career ==
At the 2005 World Series of Poker (WSOP), Josephy won a bracelet in the $1,500 seven-card stud event, defeating fellow professional Kirill Gerasimov in the final heads-up confrontation. He has also finished in the money in several World Poker Tour (WPT) events. At the 2013 World Series of Poker, Josephy won the $3,000 No Limit Hold'em Shootout to win his second bracelet.

Josephy has earned a level of success in live events that his real name is fairly well known, but he is still known by the screen name "JohnnyBax" on the Internet. At different times, he has been the number one ranked online poker tournament player on PocketFives.com.

Josephy works as a poker instructor for PokerXFactor website. Together with Eric Haber, he has produced numerous training videos featuring professional players as they play poker online.

At the Main Event of the 2009 World Series of Poker, Josephy had a 50% stake in Joe Cada; Cada won the event and the $8.5 million prize.

Josephy finished in third place at the Main Event of the 2016 World Series of Poker for his largest tournament cash to date ($3,453,035).

As of 2020, his total live tournament winnings exceed $7,700,000.

World Series of Poker Bracelets
| Year | Tournament | Prize (US$) |
|---|---|---|
| 2005 | $1,500 Seven-Card Stud | $192,150 |
| 2013 | $3,000 No Limit Hold'em Shootout | $299,486 |
