= Todd Witteles =

American poker player

- Witteles in the 2019 World Series of Poker
- Nickname: Dan Druff

World Series of Poker
- Bracelet: 1
- Money finishes: 34
- Highest WSOP Main Event finish: 88, 2010

Todd Witteles is an American professional poker player.

== Poker career ==
Witteles is primarily a cash game player. After four years in poker, he finally entered his first tournament at the 2005 World Series of Poker, where he played the $1,500 Limit Texas hold 'em event. He finished in third place out of a field of 1,049 entrants, cashing nearly $116,000. As a gimmick, Witteles used a small Head & Shoulders bottle to protect his cards while playing, in reference to his online moniker "Dan Druff."

During the same World Series of Poker, Witteles played the $3,000 Limit Hold 'em event finishing first, earning a World Series of Poker gold bracelet and $347,385. Witteles set a World Series of Poker record, as no other player in history has finished better in their first two events. He was also named CardPlayer Magazine's 2005 World Series of Poker Player of the Year.

Witteles made two other final tables at the World Series. The first was in 2006, at $1,500 No Limit Holdem, where he finished 4th. In 2013, he finished 5th in the $5,000 Limit Holdem event. In addition, Witteles barely missed WSOP final tables three other times, finishing in 10th place twice and 12th. He had two deep runs at the Main Event, finishing in 88th place (out of 7,319 entrants) in 2010, and 128th place in 2019 (out of 8,596 entrants). Overall he has cashed 34 times at the World Series, cashing every year since 2005 except for the pandemic years of 2020 and 2021, despite playing a fairly light schedule of events.

As of 2023, his total live tournament winnings exceed $1,018,000. His 34 cashes at the WSOP account for over $868,000 of those winnings.

== Appearances in media ==
Witteles was a victim of the Absolute Poker/Ultimatebet "Superuser" cheating scandal. He and several other online players took part in uncovering and proving the cheating. This attracted enough media attention to where it became the subject of a story on the TV news program "60 Minutes", where Witteles was featured. The episode aired on November 30, 2008. Witteles appeared on the front page of The Washington Post about the same matter. On December 16, 2009, he appeared on CNBC to discuss the cheating. In the CNBC special, Witteles claimed that legalization and regulation of online poker was necessary in order to prevent future cheating scandals. He also appeared on a Blu-ray Extra attached to the movie Runner Runner, entitled House Of Cards: The Inside Story of Online Poker.

In October 2022, Witteles was one of more than 50 poker pros victimized by a sophisticated bank theft scheme, and had $10,000 stolen from his account. Witteles conducted his own investigation into the matter, and identified it was occurring through a security hole in the BetMGM, Global Payments, and Viejas Casino online platforms. He aggressively brought attention to the matter to both media and law enforcement, thus putting an end to the fraud by mid-November. It was later determined by law enforcement to have been perpetrated by a theft ring out of San Diego County. Witteles eventually received his $10,000 back from BetMGM.

In March 2008, Witteles was selected among eight other top online poker players to participate in ESPN's "Online Poker Think Tank." In 2009, he was a guest broadcaster on ESPN360 for the final table of a World Series of Poker event.

== Personal ==
Witteles has a son named Benjamin, born 2010.

In August 2018, Witteles was afflicted by a chemical disorder in his brain which caused sudden and severe anxiety, depression, and anhedonia simultaneously, also resulting in an involuntary 32-pound weight loss in a matter of weeks. By early 2019, he was able to return mostly back to normal, and was able to play in the 2019 World Series of Poker.
