= Minh Ly =

Vietnamese-American poker player (born 1967)

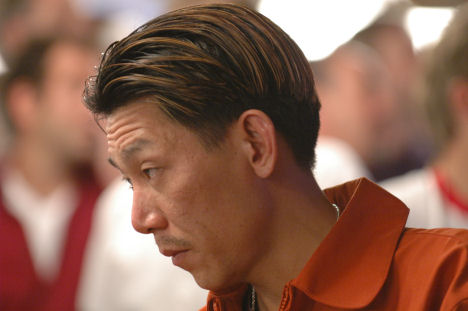
- Minh Ly at the 2005 World Series of Poker
- Born: March 24, 1967 (age 59); Vietnam

World Series of Poker
- Bracelet: None
- Money finishes: 13
- Highest WSOP Main Event finish: 9th, 2002

World Poker Tour
- Title: 1
- Final table: 1
- Money finishes: 2

Minh Hoang Ly (born March 24, 1967, in Vietnam) is a Vietnamese-American professional poker player based in Temple City, California. He is a regular in "The Big Game" and is married to Lu Binh.

Ly first cashed in the World Series of Poker (WSOP) in 2001, finishing 3rd in the $3,000 limit Texas hold 'em event, and winning $55,870. He also cashed in the $2,000 pot limit hold'em event the same year.

The following year, he finished 9th in the WSOP $10,000 no limit hold 'em Main Event, winning $85,000. In the 2005 WSOP he had four money finishes, including a second-place finish to Doyle Brunson in the $5,000 short-handed no limit hold 'em event, and 19th place in the $10,000 Main Event.

Ly also won the second Doyle Brunson North American Poker Championship in Las Vegas on October 18, 2005, when his J♣ 3♥ outdrew Dan Harrington's A♥ 5♣ on a board of 6♣ 9♦ 3♠ K♠ 7♦ in the heads-up confrontation to take home the $1,060,050 first prize and his first World Poker Tour (WPT) title.

As of January 2015, his total live tournament winnings exceed $3,800,000. His 14 cashes at the WSOP account for $2,071,657 of those winnings.

Ly appeared in season 2 of GSN's television series High Stakes Poker. During his time playing in High Stakes Poker Daniel Negreanu and other players began to jokingly imitate Ly's heavy accent during hands, which Ly found amusing. Negreanu became particularly well known for the imitation.
