= Todd Brunson =

American poker player (born 1969)

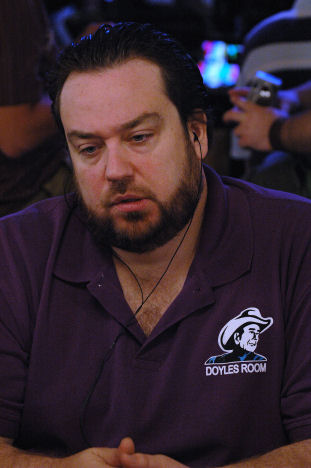
- Brunson at the 2006 World Series of Poker
- Nickname: Darkhorse
- Born: August 7, 1969 (age 57)

World Series of Poker
- Bracelet: 1
- Money finishes: 69
- Highest WSOP Main Event finish: 13th, 1992

World Poker Tour
- Title: None
- Final table: None
- Money finishes: 7

European Poker Tour
- Title: None
- Final table: None
- Money finish: 1

Todd Alan Brunson (born August 7, 1969) is an American professional poker player and the son of poker player Doyle Brunson. Doyle Brunson did not teach Todd how to play; it was not until he was studying law at Texas Tech University that he learned how to play on his own. Before his senior year, he dropped out of school to turn professional.

Most of Brunson's years as a poker player have been spent playing cash games. He plays at the Bellagio in some of their biggest cash games. Brunson won a bracelet in Omaha High-Low at the 2005 World Series of Poker, making the Brunsons the first father-son combination to each win bracelets at the World Series. Todd Brunson also contributed to his father's book, Super System 2, the 2005 sequel to Doyle Brunson's poker book Super/System, writing the Seven Card Stud High Low Eight or Better section.

Brunson's nickname "Darkhorse" comes from a tournament he played early in his career, where he was reckoned to be a huge underdog, but outlasted the likes of poker legend Chip Reese.

Brunson competed in the Poker Superstars 2 Grand Final against Johnny Chan.

In 2006, Brunson competed in the Poker Superstars 3 Grand Final against Antonio Esfandiari and defeated him by winning the first three matches in a best three out of five heads-up format. In the third round, he was down to 170,000 chips against 3,830,000 chips owned by Esfandiari and eventually won by getting more than five double ups. Brunson took home the $400,000 first prize.

In 2006, Brunson competed in the Poker Superstars 2 quarter-finalists freeroll and took home the $500,000 first prize after defeating Ted Forrest in the final heads-up confrontation. He has two runner-up finishes at the WSOP, in 2012 and 2014.

Brunson won over $13.5 million in a two-day span in a heads-up, $50,000-$100,000 limit hold-em game, as chronicled in the 2005 book, The Professor, the Banker, and the Suicide King.

Brunson has also competed in the Ultimate Poker Challenge series. He has also appeared in the GSN series High Stakes Poker.

In 2009, Brunson made a guest appearance on one of the final episodes of the series Stargate Atlantis (#519 "Vegas"), during a poker game set in Las Vegas.

As of January 2023, his total live tournament winnings exceed $4,500,000. His 69 cashes at the WSOP account for over $2 million of those winnings.

== World Series of Poker bracelets ==
Year	Tournament	Prize (US$)
2005	$2,500 Omaha High-Low Split	$255,945
