= Can Kim Hua =

Vietnamese American poker player

- Nickname: CK

World Series of Poker
- Bracelet: None
- Final tables: 3
- Money finishes: 15
- Highest WSOP Main Event finish: 393rd, 2009

World Poker Tour
- Title: None
- Final tables: 3
- Money finishes: 9

Can Kim "CK" Hua is a Vietnamese American professional poker player who is a three-time final tablist at both the World Series of Poker (WSOP) and on the World Poker Tour (WPT) with over $2.7 million in earnings.

== Career ==
In August 2002, Hua finished fifth at the World Poker Tour (WPT) first season Legends of Poker.

In January 2004, he finished fifth at the WPT second season World Poker Open.

In June 2004, he made a five-way deal to split the money and play for the trophy in a preliminary event at the California State Poker Championship. However, when he saw the trophy, Can Kim liked it so much that he changed his mind. He refused to accept the deal until the other four players agreed to declare him the winner and let him keep the trophy.

In October 2006, he finished sixth at the WPT fifth season Festa Al Lago tournament.

At the 2009 World Series of Poker (WSOP) Main Event, Hua finish in 393rd place for $27,469, then the next year at the 2009 WSOP Main Event, he finished in 531st place for $27,519.

As of 2010, his total live tournament winnings exceed $2,700,000.
