= Joe Sebok =

American poker player (born 1977)

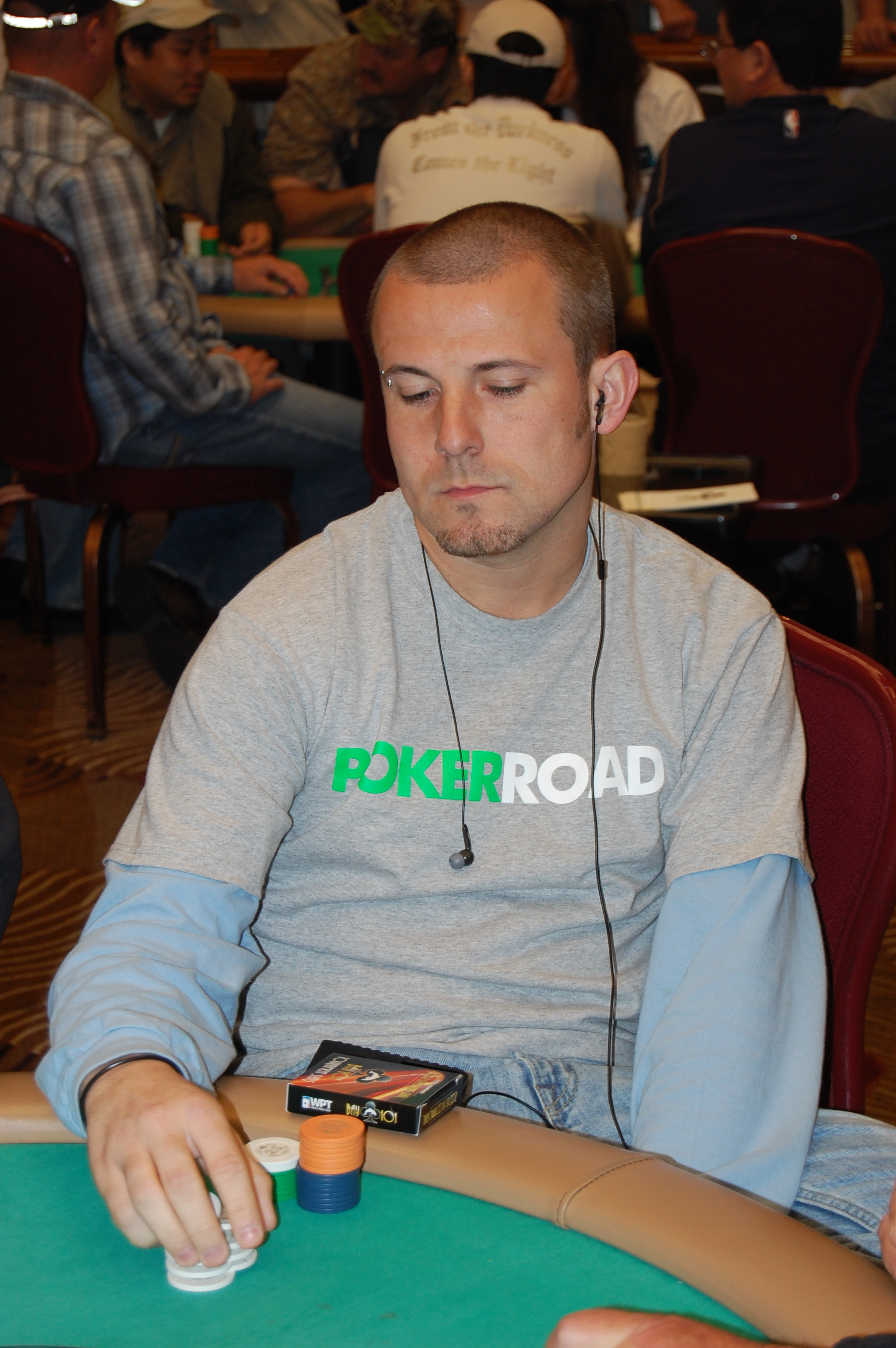
- Nicknames: The Cub, SeventhBok

World Series of Poker
- Bracelet: None
- Money finishes: 15
- Highest WSOP Main Event finish: 56th, 2009

World Poker Tour
- Title: None
- Final table: None
- Money finishes: 11

Joe Sebok (born March 25, 1977) is a professional poker player from San Francisco, California. His stepfather, Barry Greenstein, is also a professional poker player. He is known as "the Cub" because he calls Greenstein "Bear." Beginning professional play in 2005, as of 2009, his total live tournament winnings exceed $1,800,000.

Sebok is also the co-founder of PokerRoad.com. PokerRoad is a GreenBok Production, and is a joint venture between Sebok and Greenstein. PokerRoad is a poker multi-media outlet that supplies Poker Radio, Poker TV, Poker in Print, among others.

Sebok serves not only as the active President, but also as the co-host of PokerRoad Radio with friend Gavin Smith and Joe Stapleton. Sebok is the former host on Pokerwire Radio, with Gavin Smith and Joe Stapleton. Sebok was previously a host for The Circuit, a podcast produced by Card Player.

Sebok is featured on the December 2007 cover of Bluff Magazine. In September 2009 Sebok announced he would be joining Ultimatebet as a sponsored professional.

He formerly hosted the poker television series Poker2Nite with Scott Huff on the Fox Broadcasting Company television network.

Poker Road has been on a reduced schedule over the last year, which Sebok has cited to a lack of sponsorship available in the US market after the Unlawful Internet Gambling Enforcement Act of 2006.

On May 9, 2011, Joe and ten other U.S. sponsored professionals were informed by UltimateBet's parent company that their contracts had been terminated.
