= Jennifer Harman =

American poker player (born 1964)

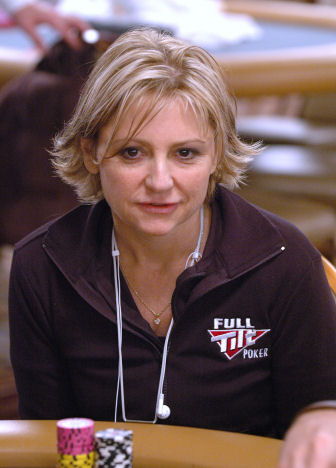
- Harman at the 2006 World Series of Poker
- Born: November 29, 1964 (age 61); Reno, Nevada, U.S.
- Organization(s): Nevada Society for the Prevention of Cruelty to Animals (NSPCA) (charity); National Kidney Foundation (fund)
World Series of Poker
- Bracelets: 2
- Final tables: 12
- Money finishes: 37
- Highest WSOP Main Event finish: None
World Poker Tour
- Title: None
- Final tables: 2
- Money finishes: 14

Jennifer C. Harman (born November 29, 1964) is an American professional poker player. She has won two World Series of Poker bracelets in open events, one of only four women to have done so.

== Poker career ==
Harman won her first World Series of Poker bracelet in 2000 at the No Limit Deuce to Seven Lowball Event (at a final table that also included fellow professionals Lyle Berman and Steve Zolotow). She had never played that game prior to the event, but received a five-minute tutoring session from Howard Lederer before playing. She won her second WSOP bracelet in 2002 at the $5,000 Limit Texas hold 'em event (the field also included Mimi Tran, Humberto Brenes, and Allen Cunningham). She was the first woman to hold two bracelets in WSOP open events, joined by Vanessa Selbst in 2012, Loni Harwood in 2015, and Kristen Bicknell in 2020.

In 2004, Harman took a year away from poker to have her second kidney transplant. Problems with her kidneys – shared by her sister and mother, who died from the same illness when Harman was 17 – had plagued her since her childhood. Since her return to the poker tournament circuit, Harman has finished 4th at the World Poker Tour Five-Diamond World Poker Classic, 5th in the inaugural Professional Poker Tour event, and 2nd in the WSOP Circuit Championship Event at the Rio.

Harman authored the limit hold'em chapter for Super System II. Harman is the only woman who is a regular player in the "Big Game" at Bobby's Room, the high-stakes cash game at the Bellagio. She was also an active participant in "The Corporation", a group of high-stakes poker players who played Andy Beal for limits of up to $100,000/$200,000.

Harman has appeared on the GSN series High Stakes Poker and on the NBC series Poker After Dark, where she won Week 8's tournament. In 2007, Harman finished as runner-up in the inaugural World Series of Poker Europe, where she lost in the HORSE event to Thomas Bihl. Harman was also a member of "Team Full Tilt" at Full Tilt Poker.

As of 2021, her total live tournament winnings exceed $2,700,000. $1,502,859 of her total winnings have come from cashes at the WSOP. Although Harman has had success in tournament poker, most of her wealth and prestige has come from playing in high stakes cash games.

Harman starred in the American reality television series Sin City Rules on TLC. She also appeared in the 2007 Warner Bros. film Lucky You.

In 2015, she was inducted into the Poker Hall of Fame.

== World Series of Poker Bracelets ==
World Series of Poker Bracelets
| Year | Tournament | Prize (US$) |
|---|---|---|
| 2000 | $5,000 No-Limit Deuce-to-Seven Draw | $146,250 |
| 2002 | $5,000 Limit Hold'em | $212,440 |

== Charity Poker ==
In 2004, Harman took a year off from poker to have her second kidney transplant. She then founded Creating Organ Donation Awareness (CODA), a non-profit organization to raise money for the cause.

Harman is a frequent charity poker tournament host. In March 2009, she organized a number of poker celebrities including ESPN analyst Lon McEachern and Howard Lederer in a two-day event that raised $111,000 for the National Kidney Foundation with the help of Curtis and Co Watches and Dream Team Poker.

Harman is also an active fundraiser for the Nevada Society for the Prevention of Cruelty to Animals (NSPCA), for which she has raised hundreds of thousands of dollars through live tournaments and online tournaments at Full Tilt. In April 2009, she hosted the 3rd annual Jennifer Harman Charity Poker Tournament at the Venetian poker room in Las Vegas. The tournament has raised over half a million dollars and, in the past, has featured prizes such as a seat at the World Series of Poker Main Event, and dinner with Jennifer and Pete Rose.
