= Aaron Kanter =

American poker player

World Series of Poker
- Bracelet: None
- Money finishes: 7
- Highest WSOP Main Event finish: 4th, 2005

World Poker Tour
- Title: None
- Final table: None
- Money finishes: 2

Aaron Kanter is a professional poker player that resides in Lodi, California.

Kanter's first major success in poker came at the 2005 World Series of Poker Main Event, where he finished in 4th place and earned $2,000,000. He has since cashed in several different poker tournaments in the United States.

On May 11, 2008, Kanter won the opening event of the 4th Full Tilt Online Poker Series, a $216 buy in No-Limit Hold'em tournament. He topped a field of 2,573 players to win the $94,403 1st place prize.

Kanter's most recent success was finishing in 3rd place in the $1,500 No Limit Hold'em event at the 2008 World Series of Poker, which earned him $258,862.

As of 2022, his total live tournament winnings exceed $2,400,000. His 7 cashes at the WSOP account for $2,314,886 of those winnings.
