= 2006 World Series of Poker results =

This list of 2006 World Series of Poker (WSOP) results includes statistics, final table results and payouts. The total money paid out in the 2006 events was $156,409,974.

== Results ==
=== Event 1: $500 No Limit Hold 'em--Casino Employees ===
This event kicked off the 2006 WSOP. It was a $500 buy-in no limit Texas hold 'em tournament reserved for casino employees that work in Nevada.

- Number of buy-ins: 1,232
- Total Prize Pool: $554,400
- Number of Payouts: 101
- Winning Hand: 4♥ 3♣

Final Table
Place	Name	Prize
1st	Chris Gros	$127,496
2nd	Bryan Devonshire	$66,528
3rd	R.J. Wright	$38,531
4th	Scott Clark	$27,720
5th	Christopher Himmenger	$22,176
6th	Craig Federspiel	$19,404
7th	David Wortham	$16,632
8th	Marsha Waggoner	$13,860
9th	Barry Goldberg	$12,474

=== Event 2: $1,500 No Limit Hold 'em ===
This event was a $1,500 buy-in no-limit Texas hold 'em tournament. It was the first public tournament of the 2006 WSOP.

- Number of buy-ins: 2,776
- Total Prize Pool: $3,789,240
- Number of Payouts: 277
- Winning Hand: Q♠ 5♥

Final Table
Place	Name	Prize
1st	Brandon Cantu	$757,839
2nd	Phong "Mark" Ly	$416,816
3rd	Drew Rubin	$226,597
4th	Lee Padilla	$176,579
5th	Brent Roberts	$151,570
6th	Don Zewin	$126,940
7th	Ron Stanley	$107,614
8th	Dustin Swartz	$88,668
9th	Juan Carlos Mortensen	$71,617

=== Event 3: $1,500 Pot Limit Hold 'em ===
This event was a $1,500 buy-in pot limit Texas hold 'em tournament. It was a three-day event with a first prize of $345,984.

- Number of buy-ins: 1,102
- Total Prize Pool: $1,504,230
- Number of Payouts: 99
- Winning Hand: 8♦ 4♦

Final Table
Place	Name	Prize
1st	Rafe Furst	$345,984
2nd	Rocky Enciso	$180,508
3rd	Eric Lynch	$104,544
4th	George Bronstein	$75,212
5th	Burt Boutin	$60,169
6th	Can Kim Hua	$52,648
7th	Richard Chase	$45,127
8th	John Juanda	$37,606
9th	Alan Gilbert	$33,845

=== Event 4: $1,500 Limit Hold 'em ===
This event was a $1,500 buy-in limit Texas hold 'em tournament. It was a three-day event with a first prize of $335,289.

- Number of buy-ins: 1,068
- Total Prize Pool: $1,457,820
- Number of Payouts: 100
- Winning Hand: 10♦ 6♠

Final Table
Place	Name	Prize
1st	Kianoush Abolfathi	$335,289
2nd	Eric Buchman	$174,938
3rd	Josh Schlein	$101,318
4th	Michele Lewis	$72,891
5th	Vipul Kothari	$58,313
6th	Hank Sparks	$51,029
7th	Patrick Maloney	$43,735
8th	Lars Hansen	$36,446
9th	Matt Elsby	$32,801

=== Event 5: $2,500 No Limit Hold 'em short-handed ===
This event was a $2,500 buy-in no limit Texas hold 'em tournament, with a maximum of six players per table instead of the normal nine. It was a three-day event with a first prize of $475,712.

- Number of buy-ins: 824
- Total Prize Pool: $1,895,200
- Number of Payouts: 90
- Winning Hand: A♦ 5♥

Final Table
Place	Name	Prize
1st	Dutch Boyd	$475,712
2nd	Joe Hachem	$256,800
3rd	Jeff Knight	$153,511
4th	Mike Goodman	$115,607
5th	Pete Hassett	$91,917
6th	David Solomon	$68,227

=== Event 6: $2,000 No Limit Hold 'em ===
This event was a $2,000 buy-in no limit Texas hold 'em tournament. It was a three-day event with a first prize of $803,274.

- Number of buy-ins: 1,919
- Total Prize Pool: $3,492,580
- Number of Payouts: 155
- Winning Hand: Q♣ T♣

Final Table
Place	Name	Prize
1st	Mark Vos	$803,274
2nd	Nam Le	$401,647
3rd	John Reiss Jr	$209,555
4th	Thomas Hunt III	$160,659
5th	Willard Chang	$136,211
6th	Kevin Peterson	$115,285
7th	Vanessa Selbst	$101,285
8th	David Wells	$87,315
9th	Juan Carlos Mortensen	$73,344

=== Event 7: $3,000 Limit Hold 'em ===
This event was a $3,000 buy-in limit Texas hold 'em tournament. It was a three-day event with a first prize of $343,618.

- Number of buy-ins: 415
- Total Prize Pool: $1,145,400
- Number of Payouts: 46
- Winning Hand: A♥ 4♦

Final Table
Place	Name	Prize
1st	William Chen	$343,618
2nd	Yueqi Zhu	$184,409
3rd	Henry Nguyen	$91,632
4th	Karlo Lopez	$80,178
5th	Danny Ciaramella	$68,724
6th	Larry Thomas	$57,270
7th	Allan Puzantyan	$45,816
8th	Ernie Scherer III	$34,362
9th	Jeff Lisandro	$22,908

=== Event 8: $2,000 Omaha Hi-low Split ===
This event was a $2,000 buy-in Limit Omaha High-low split. It was a three-day event with a first prize of $341,426.

- Number of buy-ins: 670
- Total Prize Pool: $1,219,400
- Number of Payouts: 65
- Winning Hand: A♥ 4♦ 7♣ 4♥

Final Table
Place	Name	Prize
1st	Jack Zwerner	$341,426
2nd	Rusty Mandap	$176,813
3rd	Jeff Madsen	$97,552
4th	Cong Do	$85,358
5th	Bob Mangino	$73,164
6th	Robert Collins	$60,970
7th	Daniel Negreanu	$48,776
8th	Russell Salzer	$36,582
9th	Steven Lustig	$24,388

This was the first of four top-three finishes for Madsen at this year's WSOP.

=== Event 9: $5,000 No Limit Hold'em ===
- Number of buy-ins: 622
- Total Prize Pool: $2,293,400
- Number of Payouts: 63
- Winning Hand: 5♦ 3♦

Final Table
Place	Name	Prize
1st	Jeff Cabanillas	$818,546
2nd	Phil Hellmuth Jr	$423,893
3rd	Eugene Todd	$233,872
4th	Marcel Lüske	$204,638
5th	Isabelle Mercier	$175,404
6th	Thomas Schreiber	$146,170
7th	Douglas Carli	$116,936
8th	Vinny Vinh	$87,702
9th	Danny Smith	$58,468

=== Event 10: $1,500 7 Card Stud ===
- Number of buy-ins: 478
- Total Prize Pool: $652,470
- Number of Payouts: 40
- Winning Hand: K♠ 3♥ 4♣ 6♠ 4♠ J♦ 8♥

Final Table
Place	Name	Prize
1st	David Williams	$163,118
2nd	John Hoang	$110,920
3rd	Jack Duncan	$71,772
4th	Mitchell Ledis	$45,673
5th	John Cernuto	$35,886
6th	Ivan Schertzer	$29,361
7th	Johnny Chan	$22,836
8th	Matt Hawrilenko	$16,312

=== Event 11: $1,500 Limit Hold'em ===
- Number of buy-ins: 701
- Total prize pool: $956,865
- Number of Payouts: 72
- Winning Hand: Q♥ 3♠

Final Table
Place	Name	Prize
1st	Bob Chalmers	$258,344
2nd	Tam Ho	$135,396
3rd	Warren Wooldridge	$76,549
4th	Thanh Nguyen	$66,981
5th	Doug Saab	$57,412
6th	Jan Sjåvik	$47,843
7th	Graham Duke	$38,275
8th	Bob Bartmann	$28,706
9th	David Calla	$19,137

=== Event 12: $5,000 Omaha Hi-low Split ===
This event was a $5,000 buy-in Limit Omaha High-low split. It was a two-day event with a first prize of $398,560.

- Number of buy-ins: 265
- Total Prize Pool: $1,245,000
- Number of Payouts: 26

Final Table
Place	Name	Prize
1st	Sam Farha	$398,560
2nd	Phil Ivey	$219,208
3rd	Kirill Gerasimov	$112,095
4th	Mike Henrich	$87,185
5th	Mike Wattel	$74,730
6th	Brian Nadell	$62,275
7th	Jeff King	$49,820
8th	Jim Ferrel	$37,365
9th	Ryan Hughes	$24,910

=== Event 13: $2,500 No Limit Hold'em ===
This was a three-day event.

- Number of buy-ins: 1,290
- Total Prize Pool: $2,967,000
- Number of Payouts: 99
- Winning Hand: J♣ 8♣

Final Table
Place	Name	Prize
1st	Max Pescatori	$682,389
2nd	Anthony Reategui	$356,040
3rd	Justin Pechie	$206,207
4th	Michael Scott	$148,350
5th	Corey Cheresnick	$118,680
6th	Tri Ma	$103,845
7th	Mike Matusow	$89,010
8th	Terrence Chan	$74,175
9th	Matt Heinschel	$66,578

=== Event 14: $1,000 No Limit Hold'em with rebuys ===
This was a three-day event.

- Number of buy-ins: 752
- Number of rebuys: 1,670
- Total Prize Pool: $2,317,887
- Number of Payouts: 74
- Winning Hand: A♣ Q♥

Final Table
Place	Name	Prize
1st	Allen Cunningham	$625,830
2nd	David Rheem	$327,981
3rd	Tom Franklin	$185,431
4th	Steve Wong	$162,252
5th	John Hoang	$139,073
6th	Tim Phan	$115,894
7th	Everett Carlton	$92,715
8th	Andy Bloch	$67,357
9th	Alex Jacob	$46,358

=== Event 15: $1,000 Ladies No Limit Hold'em ===
This was a two-day event for women only.

- Number of buy-ins: 1,128
- Total Prize pool: $1,026,480
- Number of Payouts: 99

Final Table
Place	Name	Prize
1st	Mary Jones Meyer	$236,094
2nd	Shanee Barton	$123,178
3rd	Beatrice Stranzinger	$71,340
4th	Reka Hallgato	$51,324
5th	Sue Luckenbaugh	$41,059
6th	Julie Allen	$35,927
7th	Devi Ortega	$30,794
8th	Laurie Scott	$25,662
9th	Ellie Ahlgren	$23,096

2005 winner, actress Jennifer Tilly did not reach the money this year. Mimi Rogers reached 33rd place, winning $5,132.

=== Event 16: $10,000 Pot-Limit Omaha ===
This was a three-day event.

- Number of buy-ins: 218
- Total Prize Pool: $2,049,200
- Number of Payouts: 27

Final Table
Place	Name	Prize
1st	Lee Watkinson	$655,746
2nd	Mike Guttman	$360,659
3rd	Mark Dickstein	$184,428
4th	Rafi Amit	$143,444
5th	Hasan Habib	$122,952
6th	Nick Gibson	$102,460
7th	Jani Vilmunen	$81,984
8th	Thomas Wahlroos	$61,476
9th	Mickey Appleman	$40,984

=== Event 17: $1,000 No Limit Hold'em ===
This was a three-day event.

- Number of buy-ins: 2,891
- Total Prize Pool: $2,630,810
- Number of Payouts: 270

Final Table
Place	Name	Prize
1st	Jon Friedberg	$526,185
2nd	John Phan	$289,389
3rd	Mike Pomeroy	$157,322
4th	Tom Hawkingberry	$122,596
5th	Kevin O'Donnell	$105,232
6th	Corey Chaston	$88,132
7th	Humberto Brenes	$74,715
8th	Michael Halford	$61,561
9th	Thang Luu	$49,722

=== Event 18: $2,000 Pot Limit Hold'em ===
This was a three-day event.

- Number of buy-ins: 590
- Total Prize Pool: $1,073,800
- Number of Payouts: 54

Final Table
Place	Name	Prize
1st	Eric Kesselman	$311,403
2nd	Hyon "Skip" Kim	$164,291
3rd	Christopher Viox	$85,904
4th	Kevin Ross	$75,166
5th	Jason Sagle	$64,428
6th	Jim McManus	$53,690
7th	Dustin Holmes	$42,952
8th	Christopher Black	$32,214
9th	Harry Thomas	$21,476

=== Event 19: $1,000 Seniors No Limit Hold'em ===
This was a two-day event.

- Number of buy-ins: 1,184
- Total Prize Pool: $1,077,440
- Number of Payouts: 99

Final Table
Place	Name	Prize
1st	Clare Miller	$247,814
2nd	Mike Nargi	$129,293
3rd	Jake Wells, Jr.	$74,882
4th	Judith Carlson	$53,872
5th	David Claiborne	$43,098
6th	Ron Rose	$37,710
7th	Doug Schuller	$32,323
8th	Stan Schrier	$26,936
9th	John Vorhaus	$24,242

=== Event 20: $50,000 H.O.R.S.E. ===
This was a three-day event alternating between limit Texas Hold'em, Omaha Hi-Lo, Razz, Seven Card Stud and Seven Card Stud Hi-Lo Eight or Better. For the final table, the play was shifted exclusively to no limit hold'em. This event had the highest buy-in ever at the WSOP at the time.

- Number of buy-ins: 143
- Total Prize Pool: $6,864,000
- Number of Payouts: 16

Final Table
Place	Name	Prize
1st	David "Chip" Reese	$1,716,000
2nd	Andy Bloch	$1,029,000
3rd	Phil Ivey	$617,760
4th	Jim Bechtel	$549,120
5th	T. J. Cloutier	$480,480
6th	David Singer	$411,840
7th	Dewey Tomko	$343,200
8th	Doyle Brunson	$274,560
9th	Patrik Antonius	$205,920

=== Event 21: $2,500 No Limit Hold'em Shorthanded ===
This was a three-day event, with a maximum of six players per table instead of the normal nine.

- Number of buy-ins: 740
- Total Prize Pool: $1,702,000
- Number of Payouts: 72

Final Table
Place	Name	Prize
1st	William Chen	$442,511
2nd	Nath Pizzolatto	$238,280
3rd	Mike Guttman	$139,564
4th	Dan Hicks	$107,226
5th	Alex Bolotin	$78,292
6th	Harry Demetriou	$58,719

This was William Chen's second first-place finish and fifth in-the-money finish in this year's WSOP.

=== Event 22: $2,000 No Limit Hold'em ===
This was a three-day event.

- Number of buy-ins: 1,579
- Total Prize Pool: $2,873,780
- Number of Payouts: 156

Final Table
Place	Name	Prize
1st	Jeff Madsen	$660,948
2nd	Paul Sheng	$330,485
3rd	Julian Gardner	$172,427
4th	Troy Parkins	$132,194
5th	Robert Cohen	$112,077
6th	Robert Bright	$94,835
7th	Michael Chow	$83,340
8th	Billy Duarte, Jr.	$71,845
9th	John Shipley	$60,349

Jeff Madsen became the youngest bracelet winner, defeating the record set the previous year by Eric Froehlich.

=== Event 23: $3,000 Limit Hold'em ===
This was a three-day event.

- Number of buy-ins: 341
- Total Prize Pool: $941,160
- Number of payouts: 37

Final Table
Place	Name	Prize
1st	Ian Johns	$291,755
2nd	Jerrod Ankenman	$150,586
3rd	Javier Torresola	$75,293
4th	Theo Tran	$65,881
5th	Mark Newhouse	$56,470
6th	Tad Jurgens	$47,058
7th	Brendan Taylor	$37,646
8th	Benjamin Robinson	$28,235
9th	Fi Tran	$18,823

=== Event 24: $3,000 Omaha Hi-low Split ===
This was a three-day event.

- Number of buy-ins: 352
- Total Prize Pool: $971,520
- Number of payouts: 36

Final Table
Place	Name	Prize
1st	Scott Clements	$301,175
2nd	Thor Hansen	$155,443
3rd	Brent Carter	$77,772
4th	Martin "Dick" Corpuz	$68,006
5th	Ronald Matsuura	$58,291
6th	Phil Hellmuth, Jr.	$48,576
7th	Peter Costa	$38,861
8th	Stephen Ladowsky	$29,146
9th	Alex Limjoco	$19,430

=== Event 25: $2,000 No Limit Hold'em Shootout ===
This was a three-day event.

- Number of buy-ins: 600
- Total Prize Pool: $1,092,000
- Number of payouts: 100

Final Table
Place	Name	Prize
1st	David Pham	$240,222
2nd	Charlie Sewell	$124,488
3rd	Roland De Wolfe	$65,520
4th	Jerald Williamson	$49,140
5th	Chad Layne	$43,680
6th	Jason DeWitt	$38,220
7th	David Bach	$32,760
8th	Dustin Woolf	$27,300
9th	Adam Kagin	$21,840
10th	Jeff Heiberg	$16,380

=== Event 26: $1,500 Pot Limit Omaha ===
This was a two-day event.

- Number of buy-ins: 526
- Total Prize Pool: $716,625
- Number of payouts: 54

Final Table
Place	Name	Prize
1st	Rafael Perry	$207,817
2nd	George Abdallah	$109,644
3rd	Brian Kocur	$57,330
4th	Zhang Luzhe	$50,164
5th	Ray Lynne	$42,998
6th	Spiro Mitrokostas	$35,831
7th	Frank Henderson	$28,665
8th	Jason Newburger	$21,499
9th	Russ Salzer	$14,333

==== Special event: $1,500 Pot Limit Omaha with Rebuys ====
This was a special, non scheduled event.

- Number of buy-ins: 158
- Number of rebuys: 492
- Total Prize Pool: $908,100
- Number of payouts: 18

Final Table
Place	Name	Prize
1st	Eric Froehlich	$299,675
2nd	Sherkhan Farnood	$165,274
3rd	Chau Giang	$90,810
4th	Kevin O'Donnell	$72,648
5th	Bruno Fitoussi	$54,486
6th	Matt Overstreet	$45,405
7th	Richard Freire	$36,324
8th	Rafi Amit	$27,243
9th	Ayaz Mahmood	$18,162

=== Event 27: $1,500 No Limit Hold'em ===
This was a two-day event.

- Number of buy-ins: 2,126
- Total Prize Pool: $2,901,990
- Number of payouts: 198

Final Table
Place	Name	Prize
1st	Mats Rahmn	$655,141
2nd	Richard Toth	$333,729
3rd	Padraig Parkinson	$203,139
4th	Chris Birchby	$145,100
5th	James Sileo	$116,080
6th	Michael Binger	$101,570
7th	Jordan Morgan	$87,060
8th	Ashwin Sarin	$72,550
9th	Billy Duarte Jr.	$58,040

=== Event 28: $5,000 Seven Card Stud ===
This was a two-day event.

- Number of buy-ins: 183
- Total Prize Pool: $855,400
- Number of payouts: 16

Final Table
Place	Name	Prize
1st	Benjamin Lin	$256,620
2nd	Shahram Sheikhan	$171,080
3rd	Cyndy Violette	$102,648
4th	Allen Kessler	$76,986
5th	John Cernuto	$55,601
6th	Patrick Bueno	$38,493
7th	Lupe Munquia	$29,939
8th	Mike Caro	$21,385

=== Event 29: $2,500 Pot Limit Hold'em ===
This was a three-day event.

- Number of buyins: 562
- Total Prize Pool: $1,292,600
- Number of payouts: 54

Final Table
Place	Name	Prize
1st	John Gale	$374,849
2nd	Maros Lechman	$197,768
3rd	Kevin Ho	$103,408
4th	Joseph Hachem	$90,482
5th	Alex Jacob	$77,556
6th	Lee Grove	$64,630
7th	Jeffrey Robertson	$51,704
8th	Lee Markholt	$38,778
9th	Gregory Alston	$25,852

=== Event 30: $5,000 No Limit Hold'em Shorthanded ===
This is a three-day event, with a maximum of six players per table.

- Number of buy-ins: 507
- Total Prize Pool: $2,382,900
- Number of payouts: 54

Final Table
Place	Name	Prize
1st	Jeff Madsen	$643,381
2nd	Erick Lindgren	$357,435
3rd	Tom Franklin	$214,461
4th	Tony Woods	$150,123
5th	Jonathan Gaskell	$119,145
6th	Paul Foltyon	$83,402

Jeff Madsen, who became the youngest bracelet winner about a week earlier, won his second bracelet and made his third final table appearance at this year's WSOP.

=== Event 31: $2,000 No Limit Hold'em ===
This is a three-day event.

- Number of buy-ins: 2,050
- Total Prize Pool: $3,731,000
- Number of payouts: 198

Final Table
Place	Name	Prize
1st	Justin Scott	$842,262
2nd	Freddy Rouhani	$429,065
3rd	Robert Bright	$261,170
4th	Gregory Glass	$186,550
5th	Nathan Templeton	$149,240
6th	Carl Olson	$130,585
7th	Josh Wakeman	$111,930
8th	Jason Johnson	$93,275
9th	Bryan Micon	$74,620

=== Event 32: $5,000 Pot Limit Hold'em ===
This is a three-day event.

- Number of buy-ins: 378
- Total Prize Pool: $1,776,600
- Number of payouts: 37

Final Table
Place	Name	Prize
1st	Jason Lester	$550,746
2nd	Alan Sass	$284,256
3rd	Stuart Fox	$142,128
4th	Tony Hartman	$124,362
5th	Michael Tedesco	$106,596
6th	Greg Turk	$88,830
7th	Emad Tamtouth	$71,064
8th	Tommy Smith	$53,298
9th	Kirill Gerasimov	$35,532

=== Event 33: $1,500 Seven Card Razz ===
This is a two-day event.

- Number of buy-ins: 409
- Total Prize Pool: $558,285
- Number of payouts: 40

Final Table
Place	Name	Prize
1st	James Richburg	$139,576
2nd	Juan Carlos Mortensen	$94,908
3rd	Steven Diano	$61,411
4th	Cliff Josephy	$39,080
5th	Ron Ritchie	$30,706
6th	Richard Sklar	$25,123
7th	John Cernuto	$19,540
8th	Jamie Brooks	$13,957

=== Event 34: $1,000 No Limit Hold'em with rebuys ===
This is a three-day event.

- Number of buy-ins: 754
- Number of rebuys: 1,691
- Total Prize Pool: $2,340,238
- Number of payouts: 73

Final Table
Place	Name	Prize
1st	Phil Hellmuth	$631,863
2nd	Juha Helppi	$331,144
3rd	Daryn Firicano	$187,219
4th	John Spadavecchia	$163,817
5th	Terris Preston	$140,414
6th	Elio Cabrera	$117,012
7th	David Plastik	$93,610
8th	Ralph Perry	$70,207
9th	Tony Guoga	$46,805

Phil Hellmuth tied legends Johnny Chan and Doyle Brunson for the most WSOP tournament wins with his 10th bracelet.

=== Event 35: $1,000 Seven Card Stud Hi Low Split ===
This is a two-day event.

- Number of buy-ins: 788
- Total Prize Pool: $717,080
- Number of payouts: 72

Final Table
Place	Name	Prize
1st	Pat Poels	$172,091
2nd	Greg Dinkin	$102,542
3rd	Jeff Madsen	$65,971
4th	Mark Bershad	$49,479
5th	William Edler	$39,439
6th	Hoyt Verner	$32,269
7th	Rodney H. Pardey	$25,098
8th	Leo Fasen	$17,927

Jeff Madsen made his fourth final table appearance and fourth top-three finish in this year's WSOP. This was also the third poker variant in which Madsen made the final table this year, as he previously made final tables in Omaha and Texas hold 'em (twice).

=== Event 36: $1,500 Limit Hold'em Shootout ===
This is a three-day event.

- Number of buy-ins: 524
- Total Prize Pool: $715,260
- Number of payouts: 54

Final Table
Place	Name	Prize
1st	Victoriano Perches	$157,338
2nd	Arnold Spee	$78,679
3rd	Anders Henriksson	$50,068
4th	Rep Porter	$39,339
5th	Tom Schneider	$28,610
6th	Marianno Garcia	$17,882

=== Event 37: $1,500 No Limit Hold'em ===
This is a three-day event.

- Number of buy-ins: 2,803
- Number of payouts: 270

Final Table
Place	Name	Prize
1st	James Gorham	$765,226
2nd	Osman Kibar	$420,870
3rd	Mohamad Ilyas	$228,800
4th	Åge Spets	$178,296
5th	Nicholas Ronyecz	$153,044
6th	Miff Fagerlie	$128,174
7th	Jason Strasser	$108,661
8th	George Christian	$89,531
9th	Peter Dalhuijsen	$72,313

=== Event 38: $5,000 No Limit 2-7 Draw Lowball with rebuys ===
This is a two-day event.

- Number of buy-ins: 81
- Number of rebuys: 159
- Total prize pool: $1,164,048
- Number of payouts: 7

Final Table
Place	Name	Prize
1st	Daniel Alaei	$430,698
2nd	David Williams	$256,091
3rd	Phillipe Rouas	$162,967
4th	Men Nguyen	$128,045
5th	Greg Raymer	$93,124
6th	Allen Cunningham	$58,202
7th	Eliyahu Levy	$34,921

=== Event 39: $10,000 No Limit Hold'em Championship Event ===
This is the "Main Event". It started on July 28 and the final table took place on August 10.

Jamie Gold took the bracelet, the title and the biggest ever payout in poker history, $12 million, after being the chip leader for most of the second week of the tournament. On the final table Gold eliminated seven of the eight opponents.

- Number of buy-ins: 8,773
- Total Prize Pool: $82,512,162
- Number of payouts: 873

Final Table
Place	Name	Prize
1st	Jamie Gold	$12,000,000
2nd	Paul Wasicka	$6,102,499
3rd	Michael Binger	$4,123,310
4th	Allen Cunningham	$3,628,513
5th	Rhett Butler	$3,216,182
6th	Richard Lee	$2,803,851
7th	Douglas Kim	$2,391,520
8th	Erik Friberg	$1,979,189
9th	Dan Nassif	$1,566,858

=== Event 40: $1,000 No Limit Hold'em ===
This was a two-day event.

- Number of buy-ins: 1,100
- Total Prize Pool: $1,001,000
- Number of payouts: 102

Final Table
Place	Name	Prize
1st	Praz Bansi	$230,209
2nd	Anh Lu	$120,120
3rd	Baktash Gulzarzada	$63,570
4th	Fabrice Soulier	$50,050
5th	Earl Coggin	$40,040
6th	John Buttifant	$35,035
7th	Mark Petrillo	$30,030
8th	Nick Memeti	$25,025
9th	Vijayan Nagarajan	$22,523

=== Event 41: $1,500 No Limit Hold'em ===
This was a two-day event.

- Number of buy-ins: 1,007
- Total prize pool: $1,374,555
- Number of payouts: 102

Final Table
Place	Name	Prize
1st	Paul Kobel	$316,144
2nd	Tyler Andrews	$164,947
3rd	Ralph Perry	$95,532
4th	Shayam Stinivasan	$68,728
5th	Eric Deregt	$54,982
6th	Chris Solomon	$48,109
7th	Shreeniwas Kelkar	$41,237
8th	Jonathan Stamm	$34,364
9th	James Henson	$30,927

=== Event 42: $1,500 No Limit Hold'em ===
This was a two-day event.

- Number of buy-ins: 352
- Total prize pool: $494,130
- Number of payouts: 38

Final Table
Place	Name	Prize
1st	James Mitchell	$153,173
2nd	Stuart Fox	$79,061
3rd	Ofer Stern	$39,530
4th	Todd Witteles	$34,589
5th	Andrew Dean	$29,648
6th	Robert Wing	$24,707
7th	Koble West	$19,765
8th	Terry Leger	$14,824
9th	Mark McCluskey	$9,883

=== Event 43: $1,500 No Limit Hold'em ===
This was a two-day event.

- Number of buy-ins: 420
- Total prize pool: $573,300
- Number of payouts: 39

Final Table
Place	Name	Prize
1st	Kevin Nathan	$171,987
2nd	J. C. Tran	$92,301
3rd	Marc Naalden	$45,864
4th	Joel Devries	$40,131
5th	Can Kim Hua	$34,398
6th	Juan Alvarado	$28,665
7th	William Chen	$22,932
8th	Randy Holland	$17,199
9th	Kevin Koch	$11,466

=== Event 44: $1,500 No Limit Hold'em ===
This was a two-day event.

- Number of buy-ins: 481
- Total prize pool: $656,565
- Number of payouts: 46

Final Table
Place	Name	Prize
1st	Kevin Cover	$196,968
2nd	Joe Brandenburg	$105,707
3rd	Josh Tiernan	$52,525
4th	Jim Nguyen	$45,960
5th	Marcus Collins	$39,394
6th	Eric Baldwin	$32,828
7th	Tommy Chaney	$26,263
8th	Matthew Hilger	$19,697
9th	Robert Perry	$13,131

=== Event 45: $1,500 No Limit Hold'em ===
This was a one-day event.

- Number of buy-ins: 494
- Total Prize Pool: $674,310
- Number of payouts: 47

Final Table
Place	Name	Prize
1st	Anders Henriksson	$202,291
2nd	Maureen Feduniak	$108,564
3rd	Phil Hellmuth	$53,945
4th	Michael Mateo	$47,202
5th	Lee Markholt	$40,459
6th	Esteban Urena	$33,716
7th	Joshua Ryan	$26,972
8th	Tan Nguyen	$20,229
9th	Lance Fryrear	$13,486
