= Douglas Kim =

Korean-American poker player (born 1983)

- Nickname: technologic
- Born: November 10, 1983 (age 43); Yonkers, New York, U.S.

World Series of Poker
- Bracelet: None
- Money finishes: 4
- Highest WSOP Main Event finish: 7th, 2006

World Poker Tour
- Title: None
- Final table: None
- Money finishes: 2

Douglas Kim (born November 10, 1983) is a Korean-American poker player and 2006 economics graduate of Duke University. Kim learned poker through a home game in college and through posting as 'technologic' on the internet forum hosted by Two Plus Two Publishing.

Kim, who was eliminated by Paul Wasicka, finished in seventh place in the 2006 World Series of Poker main event, earning him $2,391,520. At the time, Kim was the youngest player ever to make the final table at the main event, and the only player at the final table not to be knocked out by Jamie Gold.

As of 2008, his total live tournament winnings exceed $2,500,000.
