= Mark Vos =

South African poker player (born 1983)

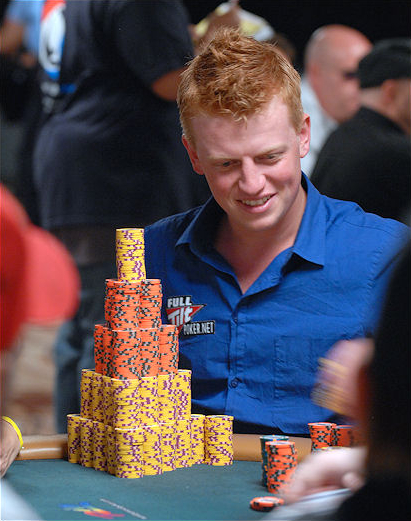
- Vos at the 2008 World Series of Poker
- Nickname: pokerbok
- Born: 20 October 1983 (age 43)

World Series of Poker
- Bracelet: 1
- Money finishes: 9
- Highest WSOP Main Event finish: 80th, 2008

European Poker Tour
- Title: None
- Final table: None
- Money finish: 1

Mark Vos (born 20 October 1983), also known as 'pokerbok', is a professional poker player from Australia. Vos was born in Cape Town, South Africa, and attended Waldorf High School in Constantia. He excelled at mathematics olympiads while in high school, and represented his province in the interprovincial olympiad. Vos permanently deferred his actuarial studies at Macquarie University, to play poker full-time. Starting out online with limit hold'em in mid-2004, Vos soon turned his attention to no-limit games, and in short time, earned a reputation as being one of the world's top online poker players, such that he can often be found playing in the most expensive cash games and tournaments online. When not travelling the world playing poker, Vos plans to divide his time between Australia and South Africa. In January 2006, Vos finished 8th in the main event of the Crown Australian Poker Championship, winning A$83,600. As of May 2006, Vos represents the Full Tilt Poker online poker cardroom as a friend of Full Tilt Poker. His name is reflected in red on Full Tilt tables.

In July 2006, Vos won Event 6 at the 2006 World Series of Poker (WSOP), the $2000 no limit hold 'em event. Outlasting a field of 1,919 players, Vos entered heads up action with Nam Le an almost 3:1 chip underdog. On the final hand, Vos raised to $90,000 preflop and Le made the call. The flop came Q♠ 8♠ 3♥ and Le check-called a $150,000 bet by Vos. The turn was the 2♦ and Le check-called for $250,000. The river brought the Q♦ to which Le checked and Vos moved all in. Le, suspecting a bluff, made the call with 6♣ 6♦, but Vos turned over Q♣ 10♣ for trips and the win, collecting $803,274 and the gold bracelet, becoming one of the youngest WSOP bracelet winners in history. After his victory, Vos said, "[Winning] does not really change things. I mean, it helps. But I still plan to play poker, then [in five years] I'll relax, settle down and decide what I want to do with the rest of my life." Vos cashed four times at the 2008 World Series of Poker, including finishing in 80th place out of 6,844 entries in the $10,000 buy-in Main Event, earning $77,200.

As of 2023, Vos' total live tournament winnings exceed $1,350,000. His nine cashes at the WSOP account for $977,728 of those winnings.

== Personal life ==
Vos is an avid golfer and a member of the Indooroopilly Golf Club in Brisbane. In October 2025, he won the club's A Grade Championship.

== World Series of Poker ==
World Series of Poker bracelets
| Year | Event | Prize money |
|---|---|---|
| 2006 | $2,000 No Limit Hold'em | $803,274 |
