= Barge (disambiguation) =

A barge is a flat-bottomed boat.

Barge or barges may also refer to:

== Places ==
France

- Barges, Côte-d'Or, a commune in Burgundy
- Barges, Haute-Loire. a commune in Auvergne
- Barges, Haute-Saône, a commune in Franche-Comté

Italy

- Barge, Piedmont, a comune in the Province of Cuneo

== People ==
- Ed Barge (1910–1991), American animator
- Gene Barge (1926–2025), American tenor and alto saxophonist and composer
- Gillian Betty Merrison (1940 – 2003), stage name Gillian Barge; English stage, television and film actress
- Sérgio Barge (born 1984), Portuguese footballer

== Construction ==
- Barge fascia a finishing piece attached to a barge rafter
- Bargeboard or barge rafter, a rafter on the end of a gable roof

== Other uses ==
- "Barge" (song)
- BARGE, an American gambling convention
- Barge, a NATO reporting name for the Tupolev Tu-85, a Soviet aircraft
- Barge, a vehicular ferry
- Barges, a contact adhesive

== See also ==
- Narrowboat, a type of boat designed for use on UK canals, sometimes mistakenly referred to as a barge
