= Carlos Mortensen =

Ecuadorian poker player (born 1972)

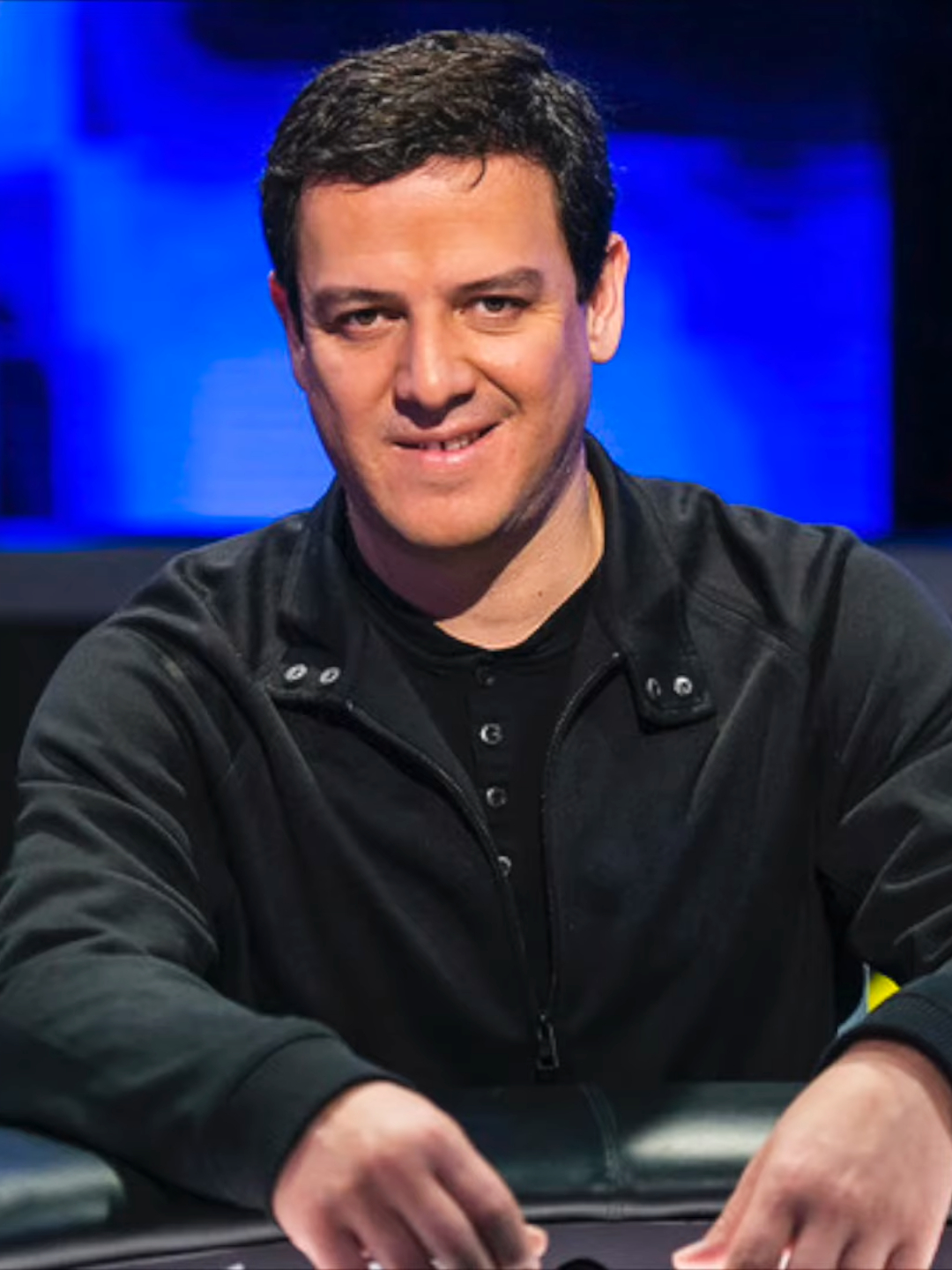
- Mortensen at the 2015 $10,000 WPT No Limit Hold'em Championship
- Nickname: El Matador
- Born: 13 April 1972 (age 54); Ambato, Ecuador

World Series of Poker
- Bracelets: 2
- Money finishes: 21
- Highest WSOP Main Event finish: Winner, 2001

World Poker Tour
- Titles: 3
- Final tables: 6
- Money finishes: 21

European Poker Tour
- Title: None
- Final table: None
- Money finish: 1

Juan Carlos Mortensen (born 13 April 1972, in Ambato, Ecuador) is an Ecuadorian professional poker player of Danish descent and the first South American Main Event winner of the World Series of Poker. Mortensen is known for his loose play, bluffing tactics, and interesting chip-stacking style. In 2016, Mortensen was elected to the Poker Hall of Fame.

== Poker career ==
=== World Series of Poker ===
Mortensen moved from Spain to the United States in the late 1990s to play poker. He won $1,500,000 at the 2001 World Series of Poker (WSOP) Main Event. Mortensen defeated a then-record field of 613 players, including a final table that included professional players Mike Matusow (sixth), 1989 WSOP Main Event champion Phil Hellmuth (fifth), Phil Gordon (fourth), and Dewey Tomko (second). In the final hand, Mortensen's K♣ Q♣ out-drew and defeated Tomko's A♠ A♥, when Mortensen's hand improved to make a straight.

Mortensen won his second career bracelet at the 2003 World Series of Poker in the $5,000 Limit Hold'em event, earning $251,680. He defeated professional player Mark Gregorich heads-up to win the title.

At the 2006 World Series of Poker, Carlos made three final tables. He finished in ninth place in Event #2 (No Limit Hold'em) winning $71,617. He once again finished in ninth place in Event #6 (NL Hold 'em), earning him $73,344. Mortensen came up just short of winning his third bracelet in Event #33 (Razz), where he finished runner-up to fellow professional James Richburg, earning him $94,908.

Mortensen finished in 10th place in the 2013 WSOP Main Event, missing the official final table by one spot.

Mortensen's victory in the 2001 Main Event earned him his first gold bracelet; this began a string of eleven consecutive years where the winner of the Main Event earned their first bracelet. As a result of the poker boom, which ignited when Chris Moneymaker won the Main Event two years after Mortensen, the fields in the tournament increased exponentially, eventually surpassing 10,000 entrants in 2023, and making it unlikely for individual players to maintain consistent success. It would not be until the 2012 event that a Main Event winner had won a prior bracelet (Greg Merson, and matched by Espen Jørstad in 2022), and not until 2023 that a Main Event winner had won a bracelet in a year prior to their victory (2023 winner Daniel Weinman won his first bracelet in 2022).

==== World Series of Poker bracelets ====
Year	Tournament	Prize (US$)
2001	$10,000 No Limit Hold'em World Championship	$1,500,000
2003	$5,000 Limit Hold'em	$251,680

=== World Poker Tour ===
In 2004, he won the World Poker Tour (WPT) Doyle Brunson North American Poker Championship for $1,000,000. Mortensen won the Season Five World Poker Tour championship event for a $3,970,415 first place prize, his largest tournament cash to date, and his second career WPT title, making him the first player in professional poker history to ever win the World Championship events at both the World Series of Poker and the World Poker Tour.

In 2010, Mortensen won the Season 8 WPT Hollywood Poker Open.

=== Other poker tournaments ===
Mortensen has made the prize money in the World Heads-Up Poker Championship, and was a semi-finalist in the second season of the Poker Superstars Invitational Tournament.

Mortensen had a good run at the 2007 European Poker Tour Main Event in Monte Carlo finishing 11th.

In 2006, he and his wife, fellow poker player Cecilia Reyes Mortensen, divorced.

As of August 2017, his total live tournament winnings exceed $12,100,000. His 21 cashes as the WSOP account for over $3,200,000 of those winnings.
