= Eddy Scharf =

German poker player (born 1953)

- Born: 7 November 1953 (age 73); Cologne, West Germany

World Series of Poker
- Bracelets: 2
- Money finishes: 15
- Highest WSOP Main Event finish: 15th, 2004

Eduard "Eddy" Scharf (born 7 November 1953) is a German professional poker player best known for winning two World Series of Poker bracelets.

Scharf, who still maintains his job as a professional airline pilot, began playing poker professionally in 1995. In 2001 and 2003, he won both of his two bracelets in the limit Omaha events at World Series of Poker (WSOP). In 2004, Scharf finished in the money in the $10,000 No Limit Hold'em Main Event coming in 15th place out of a field of 2,576 players, winning $275,000.

As of 2011, Scharf's total live tournament winnings exceed $1,200,000. His 19 cashes as the WSOP account for $801,193 of those winnings.

== World Series of Poker bracelets ==
Year	Tournament	Prize (US$)
2001	$1,500 Limit Omaha	$83,810
2003	$1,500 Limit Omaha	$63,600
