= 2001 World Series of Poker =

Series of poker tournaments

- Location: Binion's Horseshoe, Las Vegas, Nevada
- Dates: April 20 – May 19

Champion
- (Ecuador) Carlos Mortensen

The 2001 World Series of Poker (WSOP) was held at Binion's Horseshoe.

== Events ==
There were 25 preliminary bracelet events at the 2001 World Series of Poker. Phil Hellmuth became the third player in WSOP history to win seven career bracelets.

| # | Date | Event | Entries | Winner | Prize | Runner-up | Results |
|---|---|---|---|---|---|---|---|
| 1 | April 20, 2001 | $500 Casino Employees Limit Hold'em | 224 | Travis Jonas (1/1) | $40,200 | Jae Kim | Results |
| 2 | April 21, 2001 | $2,000 Limit Hold'em | 615 | Nani Dollison (1/2) | $441,440 | John Pires | Results |
| 3 | April 22, 2001 | $1,500 Omaha Hi-Lo Split 8 or better | 306 | Chris Ferguson (1/3) | $164,735 | Men Nguyen (0/4) | Results |
| 4 | April 23, 2001 | $1,500 Seven-card stud | 272 | Adam Roberts (1/1) | $146,430 | Sal Dimicelli | Results |
| 5 | April 24, 2001 | $2,000 No Limit Hold'em | 441 | Phil Hellmuth (1/7) | $316,550 | T. J. Cloutier (0/4) | Results |
| 6 | April 25, 2001 | $1,500 Limit Omaha | 144 | Eddy Scharf (1/1) | $83,810 | Michael Davis | Results |
| 7 | April 26, 2001 | $1,500 Seven Card Stud Hi-Lo Split 8 or better | 230 | Barry Shulman (1/1) | $123,820 | Dan Heimiller | Results |
| 8 | April 27, 2001 | $1,500 Pot Limit Omaha w/Rebuys | 145 | Galen Kester (1/1) | $167,035 | Dave Ulliott (0/1) | Results |
| 9 | April 28, 2001 | $2,000 S.H.O.E. | 181 | David Pham (1/1) | $140,455 | Skip Wilson | Results |
| 10 | April 29, 2001 | $3,000 Limit Hold'em | 192 | Jim Lester (1/1) | $233,490 | Alex Brenes | Results |
| 11 | April 30, 2001 | $2,500 Seven Card Stud | 152 | Paul Darden (1/1) | $147,440 | Tom Franklin (0/1) | Results |
| 12 | May 1, 2001 | $2,000 Pot Limit Hold'em | 270 | Burt Boutin (1/1) | $193,800 | Dave Ulliott (0/1) | Results |
| 13 | May 2, 2001 | $1,500 Razz | 144 | Berry Johnston (1/5) | $83,810 | Mike Wattel (0/1) | Results |
| 14 | May 3, 2001 | $2,500 Pot Limit Omaha w/Rebuys | 102 | Scotty Nguyen (1/3) | $178,480 | Jim Lester (0/1) | Results |
| 15 | May 4, 2001 | $2,500 Seven Card Stud Hi-Lo Split 8 or better | 164 | Rich Korbin (1/1) | $159,080 | Alex Papachatzakis | Results |
| 16 | May 5, 2001 | $1,500 Ace to Five Draw Lowball | 127 | Cliff Yamagawa (1/1) | $73,915 | David Danheiser | Results |
| 17 | May 6, 2001 | $2,500 Omaha Hi-Lo Split 8 or better | 179 | Bob Slezak (1/1) | $173,625 | Tony Ma (0/2) | Results |
| 18 | May 7, 2001 | $5,000 No Limit Deuce to Seven Draw w/Rebuys | 33 | Howard Lederer (1/2) | $165,870 | Freddy Deeb (0/1) | Results |
| 19 | May 7, 2001 | $1,000 Seniors' No Limit Hold'em | 340 | Jay Heimowitz (1/6) | $115,430 | Garry Pollak | Results |
| 20 | May 8, 2001 | $3,000 Pot Limit Hold'em | 226 | Steve Zolotow (1/2) | $243,335 | Mike Magee | Results |
| 21 | May 9, 2001 | $5,000 Seven Card Stud | 104 | Allen Cunningham (1/1) | $201,760 | Michael Danino | Results |
| 22 | May 10, 2001 | $3,000 No Limit Hold'em | 382 | Erik Seidel (1/5) | $411,300 | Johnny Chan (0/6) | Results |
| 23 | May 11, 2001 | $5,000 Omaha Hi-Lo Split 8 or better | 107 | Scotty Nguyen (2/4) | $207,580 | Phil Hellmuth (0/7) | Results |
| 24 | May 12, 2001 | $5,000 Limit Hold'em | 161 | Hemish Shah (1/1) | $312,340 | Tony Duong | Results |
| 25 | May 13, 2001 | $1,000 Ladies' Limit Hold'em/Seven Card Stud | 106 | Nani Dollison (2/3) | $41,130 | Patty Gallagher | Results |
| 26 | May 14, 2001 | $10,000 No Limit Hold'em Main Event | 613 | Carlos Mortensen (1/1) | $1,500,000 | Dewey Tomko (0/3) | Results |

== Main Event ==
There were 613 entrants to the main event. Each paid $10,000 to enter, with the top 45 players finishing in the money. It was the largest poker tournament ever played in a non-online casino at the time. The 2001 Main Event was the first tournament in history to pay out at least $1,000,000 to two players. Phil Hellmuth made the final table and looked to become a two-time Main Event champion, but fell short in fifth place.

=== Final table ===
| Name | Number of chips (percentage of total) | WSOP Bracelets* | WSOP Cashes* | WSOP Earnings* |
|---|---|---|---|---|
| (Germany) Henry Nowakowski | 1,076,000 (17.6%) | 0 | 0 | 0 |
| (Ecuador) Carlos Mortensen | 873,000 (14.2%) | 0 | 1 | $22,575 |
| (United States) Phil Hellmuth | 859,000 (14.0%) | 7 | 31 | $2,561,145 |
| (United States) Mike Matusow | 767,000 (12.5%) | 1 | 5 | $380,220 |
| (United States) Phil Gordon | 681,000 (11.1%) | 0 | 2 | $8,000 |
| (United States) Stan Schrier | 672,000 (11.0%) | 0 | 0 | 0 |
| (United States) Dewey Tomko | 467,000 (7.6%) | 3 | 27 | $816,729 |
| (United States) Steve Riehle | 407,000 (6.6%) | 0 | 0 | 0 |
| (United States) John Inashima | 328,000 (5.4%) | 0 | 3 | $22,128 |

*Career statistics prior to the beginning of the 2001 Main Event.

=== Final table results ===
| Place | Name | Prize |
|---|---|---|
| 1st | Carlos Mortensen | $1,500,000 |
| 2nd | Dewey Tomko | $1,098,925 |
| 3rd | Stan Schrier | $699,315 |
| 4th | Phil Gordon | $399,610 |
| 5th | Phil Hellmuth | $303,705 |
| 6th | Mike Matusow | $239,765 |
| 7th | Henry Nowakowski | $179,825 |
| 8th | Steve Riehle | $119,885 |
| 9th | John Inashima | $91,190 |

=== In The Money Finishes ===
NB: This list is restricted to In The Money finishers with an existing Wikipedia entry.

| Place | Name | Prize |
|---|---|---|
| 11th | Daniel Negreanu | $63,940 |
| 20th | Kevin Song | $39,960 |
| 23rd | Jim Bechtel | $39,960 |
| 24th | Alex Brenes | $39,960 |
| 26th | John Esposito | $39,960 |
| 27th | Allen Cunningham | $39,960 |
| 29th | Mike Sexton | $30,000 |
| 30th | Chris Bjorin | $30,000 |
| 33rd | Barny Boatman | $30,000 |
| 37th | Billy Baxter | $20,000 |
| 42nd | Bill Gazes | $20,000 |
| 44th | David Pham | $20,000 |
