= Stuart Fox =

English poker player (born 1978)

- Nickname: Foxy
- Born: 1982 (age 43–44); Birmingham, England, UK

World Series of Poker
- Bracelet: None
- Money finishes: 8
- Highest WSOP Main Event finish: None

World Poker Tour
- Title: None
- Final table: 1
- Money finishes: 2

European Poker Tour
- Title: None
- Final table: None
- Money finishes: 2

Stuart Fox (born 1982 in Birmingham, England) is a professional poker player who started off playing online poker and has now become one of the United Kingdom's most recognized and successful tournament players.

== Poker career ==
As of 2010, his live tournament winnings exceed $1,200,000. His 8 cashes at the WSOP account for $698,561 of those winnings.

Year	Tournament	Position	Prize
2006 World Series of Poker	$5,000 Pot Limit Hold'em	3rd	$142,128
2006 World Series of Poker	$1,500 No Limit Hold'em	2nd	$79,061
Barcelona Ongame Poker Classic	$5,000 No Limit Hold'em	1st	$239,384
2007 World Series of Poker	$5,000 No Limit Hold'em	2nd	$448,892

== WPT ==
He has several cashes from the World Poker Tour.

Year	Tournament	Position	Prize
2005 WPT Season IV	$5,200 NLHE Aruba Poker Classic	54th	$6,000
2008 WPT Season VII	NLHE WPT Bellagio Cup	56th	$19,390
2008 WPT Season VII	$5,000 No Limit Hold'em	1st	$239,384
2012 WPT Season XI	$400 No Limit Hold'em	4th	$14,186
2012 WPT Season XI	$4,400	29th	$8,070
