= David Singer (poker player) =

American poker player

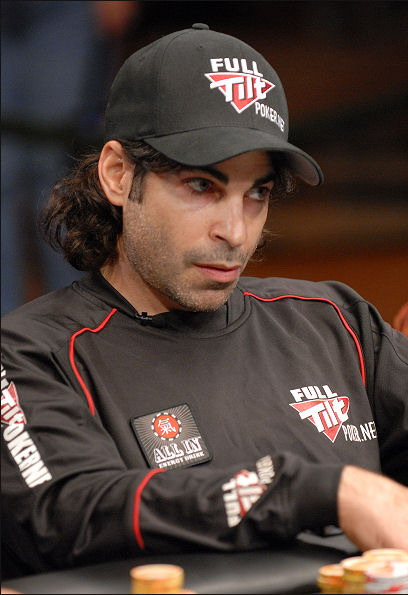
- Singer at the $15,000 buy-in National Poker League Vegas Open Championship in 2007

World Series of Poker
- Bracelets: 2
- Money finishes: 28
- Highest WSOP Main Event finish: 9th, 2003

World Poker Tour
- Title: None
- Final tables: 2
- Money finishes: 9

David Singer (born in Brooklyn, New York) is an American professional poker player and former attorney.

== Law career ==
Singer is a former environmental lawyer who worked on issues and lawsuits related to cleaning up the Long Island Sound for a non-profit organization.

== Poker career ==
Singer has been playing poker professionally since 1996, concentrating on seven-card stud before moving to mostly Texas hold 'em tournaments.

In October 2007, Singer won the Caesars Palace Classic $9,800 No Limit Hold'em Championship Event, winning $1,000,000.

In May 2008, Singer earned $560,000 by winning the $25,000 Full Tilt Poker Heads Up World Championship. The tournament featured 64 players in the largest buy-in in online poker history.

As of 2010, his total live tournament winnings exceed $4,200,000. His 28 cashes at the WSOP account for $1,493,368 of those winnings.

== World Series of Poker ==
Singer has garnered considerable success in World Series of Poker play. He is the only person to make the final table of the three largest buy-in No-Limit Hold'em events in a single year at the World Series of Poker, which he did in 2003. At the 2003 WSOP, Singer made the final table of the Main Event, busting out in ninth place, earning $120,000.

Singer's biggest result at the 2006 World Series of Poker was a sixth-place finish in the $50,000 HORSE event, earning $411,840. This tournament's final table was broadcast by ESPN and was one of the toughest final tables in the history of the WSOP. It featured two world champions, Doyle Brunson and Jim Bechtel, as well as multi-bracelet winners Dewey Tomko, T. J. Cloutier, Phil Ivey, and Chip Reese.

After being away from the majority of the 2007 WSOP for personal reasons, he became the first player to make back-to-back final tables in the $50,000 HORSE event, again finishing sixth.

At the 2008 World Series of Poker in the $1,500 Pot-Limit Hold'em event, Singer won his first bracelet earning $214,131.

At the 2017 World Series of Poker, Singer won his second career WSOP bracelet in a $1,500 H.O.R.S.E. event. He earned $203,709 for the victory.

=== World Series of Poker bracelets ===
Year	Tournament	Prize (US$)
2008	$1,500 Pot-Limit Hold'em	$214,131
2017	$1,500 H.O.R.S.E.	$203,709
