= Allen Cunningham =

American poker player (born 1977)

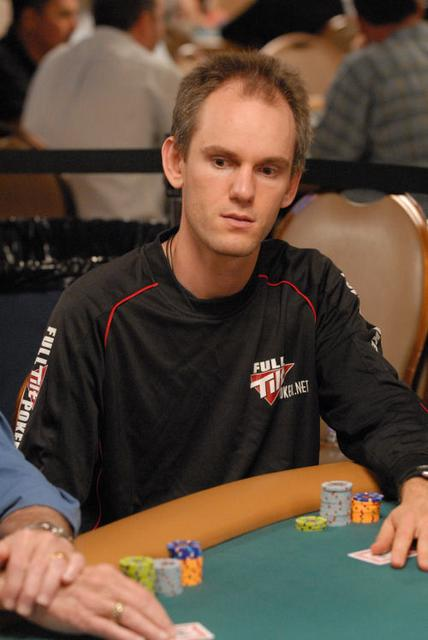
- Cunningham at the 2007 World Series of Poker
- Nickname: Clever Piggy
- Born: March 28, 1977 (age 49)

World Series of Poker
- Bracelets: 5
- Final tables: 18
- Money finishes: 55
- Highest WSOP Main Event finish: 4th, 2006

World Poker Tour
- Title: None
- Final tables: 2
- Money finishes: 17

Allen Cunningham (born March 28, 1977) is an American professional poker player who has won five World Series of Poker (WSOP) bracelets.

== Career ==
Cunningham studied civil engineering at UCLA before dropping out of school to play poker professionally. At the age of 18, he began playing at Indian casinos. Cunningham won his first verified tournament in September 1998 at the National Championship of Poker in Inglewood. Previously a Full Tilt sponsored pro, he became a full member of Team Full Tilt in October 2006.

Cunningham earned the title 2005 ESPN/Toyota Player of the Year and came close to winning it again in 2006.

Cunningham's single largest tournament payout occurred at the 2006 World Series of Poker when he finished in fourth place out of 8,773 players in the Main Event, earning $3,628,513.

Cunningham joined a short list of players who have won a WSOP bracelet in three consecutive years after winning his fifth bracelet in 2007. Others to accomplish this include Johnny Moss, Bill Boyd, Doyle Brunson, Loren Klein, Gary Berland, Erik Seidel and Nick Schulman. Cunningham has won five bracelets in his WSOP career.

Cunningham won the $300,000 'Mega Match' on Poker After Dark that aired the week of October 8, 2007. On December 7, 2007, Cunningham won the $15,000 buy-in inaugural National Poker League Vegas Open Championship Main Event after defeating David Singer during heads-up play, winning over $325,000.

On May 1, 2008, Cunningham won the 2008 World Series of Poker Circuit event at Caesars Palace, Las Vegas, earning $499,069. In the 2008 World Series of Poker Cunningham made another deep run in the Main Event, finishing 117th place out of 6,844 players, earning $41,816. In November 2010, he, along with Huck Seed, won $500,000 for winning the Full Tilt Poker Doubles Poker Championship.

As of 2023, his total live tournament winnings exceed $11,900,000, 90th on the all time winnings list. As of March 2023, his 84 cashes, including his five bracelets, have netted him $7,988,439 in WSOP earnings.

=== Later career ===
Cunningham remained a member of Team Full Tilt until April 2011, when the U.S. Department of Justice's Black Friday indictments shut Full Tilt Poker out of the U.S. market, and his tournament schedule became lighter in the years that followed. He stepped away from poker around the middle of 2019 and returned roughly three years later. At the 2024 World Series of Poker, he finished 1,052nd out of 10,112 players in the Main Event, earning $17,500. As of July 2024, his total live tournament earnings stand at $11,942,371.

World Series of Poker Bracelets
Year	Tournament	Prize (US$)
2001	$5,000 Seven-card stud	$201,760
2002	$5,000 Deuce to Seven Draw	$160,200
2005	$1,500 No Limit Hold 'em	$725,405
2006	$1,000 No Limit Hold'em/w Rebuys	$625,830
2007	$5,000 Pot Limit Hold'em	$487,287

== Awards ==
ALL IN Magazine 2006 Poker Player of the Year
