= Jason Lester =

Canadian-born poker player

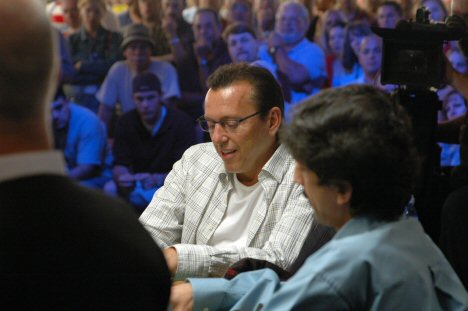
- Lester in the 2005 World Series of Poker
- Nickname: None
- Born: Montreal, Quebec, Canada

World Series of Poker
- Bracelet: 1
- Money finishes: 21
- Highest WSOP Main Event finish: 4th, 2003

World Poker Tour
- Title: None
- Final table: None
- Money finishes: 3

Jason Lester (born in Montreal, Quebec) is a professional poker player who has also lived in New York City and Los Angeles. He currently resides in Miami, Florida. He is also an exceptional backgammon player and has won many tournaments in the past. He finished in fourth place for $440,000 at the 2003 World Series of Poker (WSOP), the year Chris Moneymaker won the event. Lester was also involved in the film Lucky You, starring Robert Duvall, Eric Bana, and Drew Barrymore, in which he played himself, among other poker stars.

Lester picked up his first career WSOP bracelet in the 2006 $5,000 Pot Limit Hold'em event.

As of 2022, his total live tournament winnings exceed $2,300,000. His 29 cashes as the WSOP account for $1,913,984 of those winnings.
