= David Pham =

Vietnamese-American poker player (born 1967)

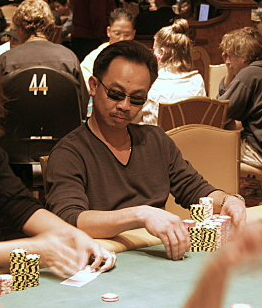
- Pham at the 2004 World Poker Tour's Festa al Lago
- Nickname: The Dragon
- Born: February 10, 1967 (age 59)

World Series of Poker
- Bracelets: 3
- Money finishes: 50
- Highest WSOP Main Event finish: 44th, 2001

World Poker Tour
- Title: None
- Final tables: 7
- Money finishes: 20

European Poker Tour
- Title: None
- Final table: 1
- Money finish: 1

David Pham (born February 10, 1967, in South Vietnam), is a Vietnamese-American professional poker player from Bell Gardens, California, with three World Series of Poker bracelets who has made seven final tables at the World Poker Tour.

== Early life ==
Pham was born in South Vietnam and fled to the United States at the age of 17 in a boat carrying 145 people, of whom only 46 survived the journey. Once in the United States, Pham gained employment at his cousin's laundry business. His cousin is the famed professional poker player Men Nguyen, from whom Pham learned poker and continued to do so even after Pham along with his wife had opened a nail salon in Los Angeles, California.

== Poker ==
In both 2000 and 2007 Pham was named "Player of the Year" by Card Player.

As of 2017, his total live tournament winnings exceed $9,850,000. His 50 cashes at the WSOP account for over $2,175,000 of those winnings.

=== World Series of Poker ===
Pham won a World Series of Poker (WSOP) bracelet in 2001 for the $2.000 S.H.O.E. event, defeating a final table including Tom McEvoy, John Cernuto, Cyndy Violette and Paul Darden. In 2006, Pham won a second WSOP bracelet in the $2,000 No Limit Hold'em Shootout event. He won a $1,500 No Limit Hold'em event in 2017 for his third bracelet. He won a WSOP Circuit event in the $1,675 No Limit Hold'em - Main Event in Los Angeles in 2018.

=== World Series of Poker Bracelets ===
Year	Tournament	Prize (US$)
2001	$2,000 S.H.O.E.	$140,455
2006	$2,000 No Limit Hold'em Shootout	$240,222
2017	$1,500 No Limit Hold'em	$391,960

=== Other poker ===
In February 2003, Pham won the $5,000 limit hold'em event of the L.A. Poker Classic, outlasting such players as John Phan and Jennifer Harman to take home the $457,320 first prize.

Later, in December 2004, he defeated Alan Goehring heads-up to win the $3,000 no limit hold'em event at the Five Diamond World Poker Classic, earning a payday of $414,419.

On March 28, 2008, Pham made his sixth WPT final table at the 2008 World Poker Challenge, where he finished 5th earning $93,664. On November 5, 2008, Pham finished in fourth place at the WPT Foxwoods World Poker Finals, earning $240,344.

In January 2008, Pham finished in fourth place, winning $600,000 at the European Poker Tour's (EPT) PokerStars Caribbean Poker Adventure (formerly a WPT event) after being eliminated at the final table by Bertrand Grospellier, who called Pham all-in with an ace high flush draw on the turn, which was made on the river.
