= Jon Friedberg =

American poker player and business owner

World Series of Poker
- Bracelet: 1
- Money finishes: 15
- Highest WSOP Main Event finish: 190th, 2011

European Poker Tour
- Title: None
- Final table: None
- Money finishes: 2

Jon Friedberg is an American professional poker player and business owner. In his World Series of Poker career he has finished in the money 14 times including two final tables and one WSOP bracelet, which he won in a $1,000 No Limit Hold'em event for $526,185.

As of 2010, his lifetime career tournament earnings total $1,031,447. His 14 WSOP cashes accounting for $746,147 of that.

== World Series of Poker Bracelets ==
Year	Tournament	Prize (US$)
2006	$1,000 No Limit Holdem	$526,185
