= Eric Lynch =

American poker player (born 1978)

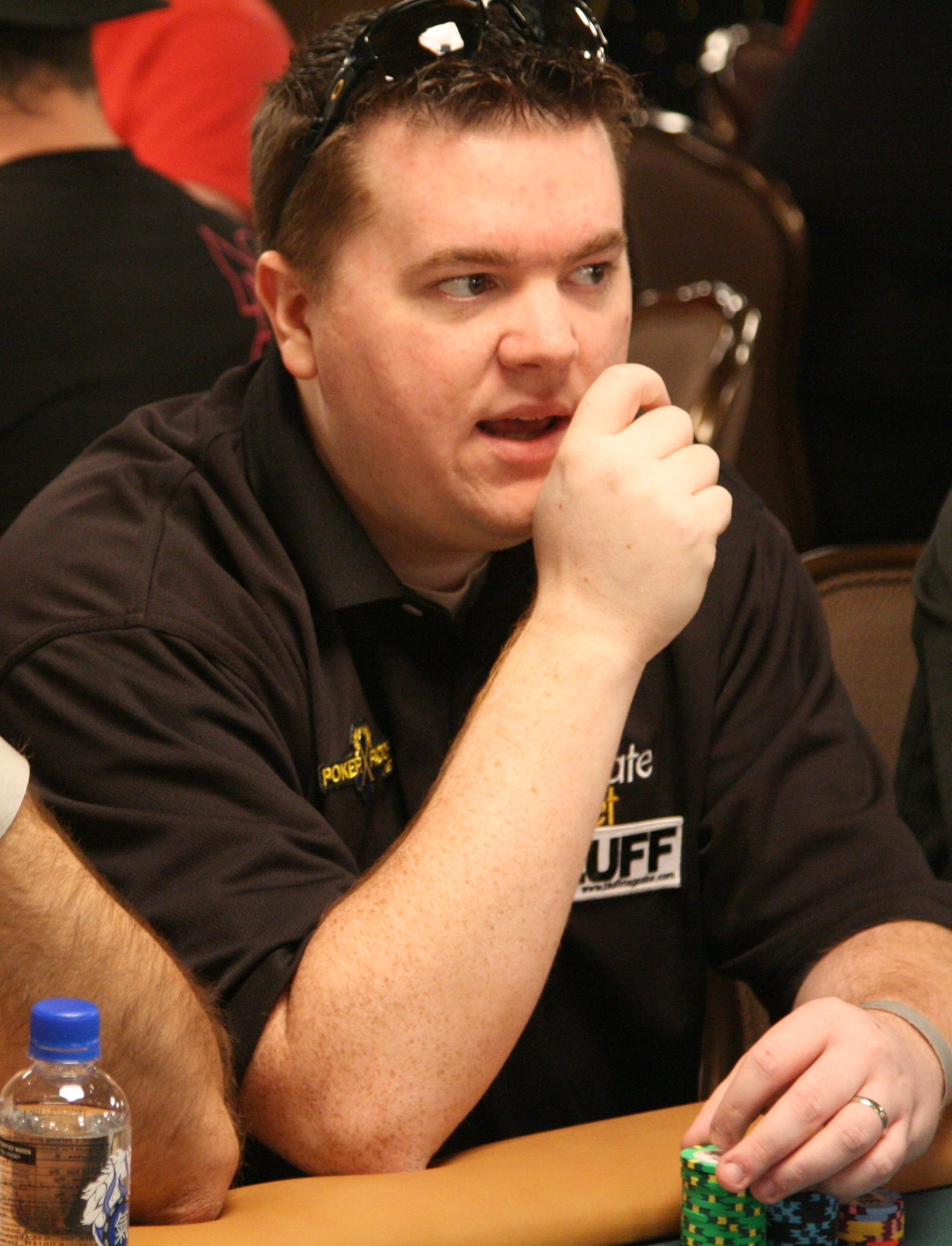
- Lynch at the 2008 World Series of Poker
- Nickname: Rizen
- Born: October 20, 1978 (age 48); St. Louis, Missouri, U.S.

World Series of Poker
- Bracelet: None
- Money finishes: 12
- Highest WSOP Main Event finish: 24th, 2006

World Poker Tour
- Title: None
- Final table: None
- Money finish: 1

European Poker Tour
- Title: None
- Final table: None
- Money finish: 1

Eric Lynch (born October 20, 1978, in St. Louis, Missouri) is a professional poker player.

Lynch resides in Olathe, Kansas. In 2006, he won a PokerStars $1 million guaranteed tournament and finished 24th at the 2006 World Series of Poker Main Event, earning $494,000. He placed 3rd in a pot limit Hold'em WSOP event that same year. In 2007, at the WSOP he placed 2nd in a pot limit Omaha event and 7th in a pot limit Hold'em event.

In January 2008, Lynch finished in 26th place winning $40,000, at the European Poker Tour's (EPT) PokerStars Caribbean Poker Adventure.

Before turning pro he was an IT consultant. Lynch's internet poker screen names are "Rizen" and "Snkybluffalo" and is mostly seen at PokerStars and Full Tilt Poker.

As of 2010, his total live tournament winnings exceed $900,000. His 12 cashes at the WSOP account for $839,410 of those winnings.

Lynch, along with Jon Turner, Jon Van Fleet and Matthew Hilger, authored a book entitled Winning Poker Tournaments: One Hand at a Time Volume I The book offers an analysis of individual hands, different styles and a view into the TAG game of Pearljammer, the aggressive game of Apestyles, and the in between approach of Rizen.

In May 2009, the first day of the 40th World Series of Poker competition, Lynch signed with Lock Poker.

== Bibliography ==
- Winning Poker Tournaments One Hand at a Time Volume I (2008) ISBN 0-9741502-7-4
- Winning Poker Tournaments One Hand at a Time Volume II (2010) ISBN 0-9841434-4-0
