= Bill Chen =

American mathematician, poker player, software designer and badminton player

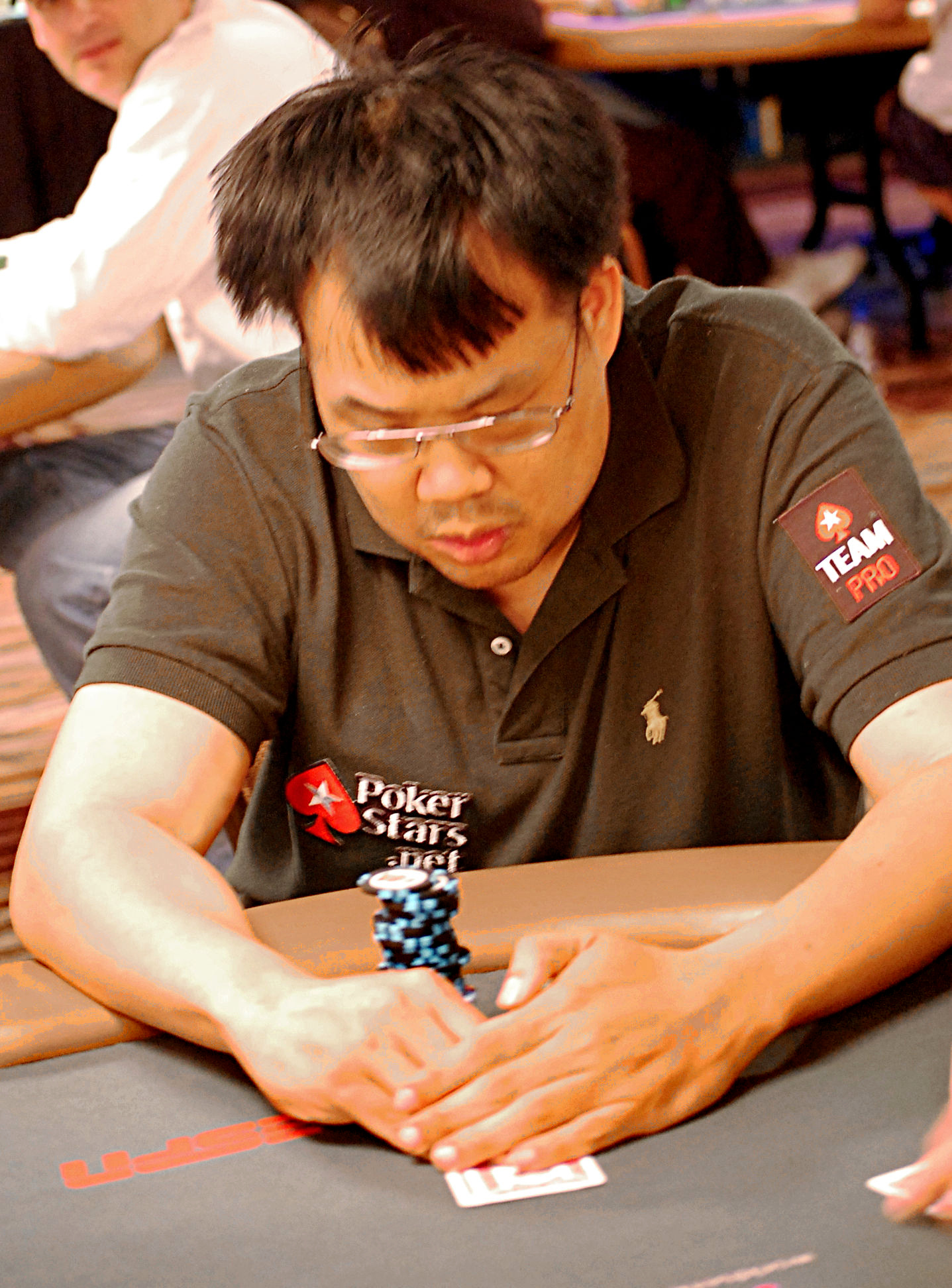
- Chen at the 2008 World Series of Poker
- Born: 19 July 1970 (age 56); Williamsburg, Virginia, U.S.

World Series of Poker
- Bracelets: 2
- Final tables: 11
- Money finishes: 38
- Highest WSOP Main Event finish: None

European Poker Tour
- Title: None
- Final table: None
- Money finishes: 2

William Chen (born 1970 in Williamsburg, Virginia) is an American quantitative analyst, poker player, and software designer.

== Biography ==
Chen holds a Ph.D. in mathematics (1999) from the University of California, Berkeley. He was an undergraduate at Washington University in St. Louis triple-majoring in physics, Math (in the college of Arts and Sciences), and Computer Science (in the McKelvey School of Engineering), and was also a research intern in Washington University's Computer Science SURA Program where he co-wrote a technical report inventing an Argument Game. He heads the Statistical arbitrage department at Susquehanna International Group.

== Poker career ==
At the 2006 World Series of Poker Chen won two events, a $3,000 limit Texas hold 'em event with a prize of $343,618, and a $2,500 no limit hold 'em short-handed event with a prize of $442,511. Prior to these events Chen's largest tournament win was for $41,600 at a no limit hold 'em event at the Bicycle Casino's Legends of Poker in 2000.

Chen has been a longtime participant in the rec.gambling.poker newsgroup and its BARGE offshoot. He has also been a member of Team PokerStars.

With Jerrod Ankenman, Chen coauthored The Mathematics of Poker, an introduction to quantitative techniques and game theory as applied to poker.

In February 2009, he appeared on Poker After Dark's "Brilliant Minds" week, finishing in 5th place after his A♦ 3♦ lost to Jimmy Warren's A♠ A♥ after Chen pushed all-in on a flop of A♣ 3♣ Q♦.

As of 2017, his total live tournament winnings exceed $1,900,000. His 38 cashes at the WSOP account for over $1,725,000 of those winnings.

=== World Series of Poker bracelets ===
Year	Tournament	Prize (US$)
2006	$2,500 Short Handed No Limit Hold'em	$442,511
2006	$3,000 Limit Hold'em	$343,618

== Bibliography ==
- Bill Chen and Jerrod Ankenman (2006). The Mathematics of Poker. Conjelco. ISBN 1-886070-25-3.
