= Paul Wasicka =

American poker player (born 1981)

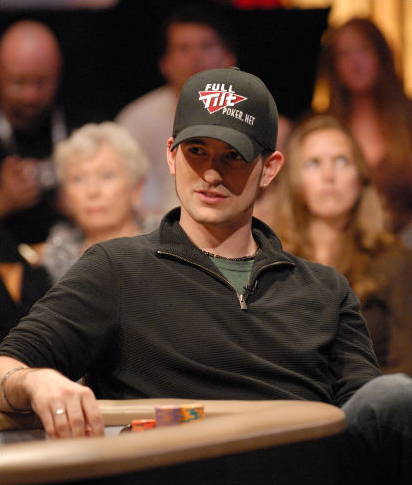
- Wasicka at the 2007 NBC National Heads-Up Poker Championship
- Nickname: Kwickfish
- Born: February 17, 1981 (age 45)

World Series of Poker
- Bracelet: None
- Money finishes: 14
- Highest WSOP Main Event finish: 2nd, 2006

World Poker Tour
- Title: None
- Final table: 1
- Money finishes: 6

Paul J. Wasicka (born February 17, 1981, in Dallas, Texas) is a professional poker player, based in Denver, Colorado, who was the runner-up at the 2006 World Series of Poker Main Event and the winner of the 2007 NBC National Heads-Up Poker Championship. Paul attended college in Madison, WI.

== World Series of Poker ==
Wasicka finished as runner-up to Jamie Gold in the 2006 World Series of Poker Main Event, winning over $6,000,000.

== Other poker events ==
=== NBC National Heads-Up Poker Championship ===
Wasicka's tournament accomplishments since that World Series of Poker finish include winning the 2007 NBC National Heads-Up Poker Championship by defeating Eli Elezra, Joe Hachem, T. J. Cloutier, Nam Le, Shannon Elizabeth, and finally Chad Brown in the finals 2-0. He won $500,000 for his victory in the tournament.

=== World Poker Tour ===
At the World Poker Tour (WPT) $9,900 No Limit Hold'em held at the 2007 L.A. Poker Classic, Wasicka made the final table which also included poker players J. C. Tran and Eric Hershler, he finished in fourth place, earning $455,615. Wasicka has also cashed in three other WPT Championship events and has made a total of over $700,000 from WPT events alone.

=== Aussie Millions ===
At the 2007 Aussie Millions A$10,000 Main Event, Wasicka just missed making the final table, coming in 12th and earning A$120,000 ($95,434). The event was won by fellow professional poker player Gus Hansen.

As of 2016, Wasicka's total live tournament winnings exceed $7,885,000. His 14 cashes at the WSOP account for $6,308,316 of those winnings.
