= 2006 World Series of Poker =

Series of poker tournaments

- Location: Rio All-Suite Hotel and Casino, Las Vegas, Nevada
- Dates: June 26 – August 10

Champion
- (United States) Jamie Gold

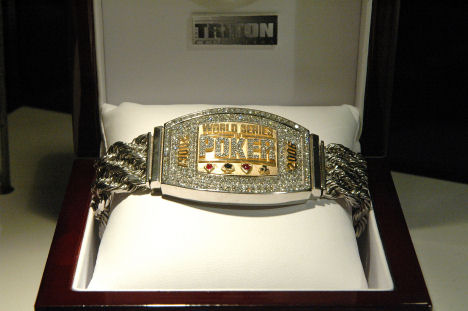
The 2006 WSOP Championship bracelet

The 2006 World Series of Poker (WSOP) began on June 25, 2006, with satellite events, with regular play commencing on June 26 with the annual Casino Employee event and the Tournament of Champions held on June 28 and 29. Forty more events, in various disciplines including Omaha, seven-card stud and razz, plus ladies' and senior tournaments, led up to the 10,000 US$ no-limit Texas hold 'em main event starting July 28 and running through the final table on August 10.

All events were held at the Rio All Suite Hotel and Casino in Las Vegas, Nevada, which marked the first time that a casino other than Binion's Horseshoe (now "Binion's") hosted the final table of the main event. Six days reserved for the first two rounds of play for the main event were established by Harrah's Entertainment, which has run the annual event since its purchase from the Binion family in 2004.

The first prize in the main event was $12 million (US$), at that time the richest prize for the winner of any sports or television event in history. The top 12 players became millionaires. The record prize was surpassed at the 2012 WSOP, when the winner of the $1 million buy-in Big One for One Drop, Antonio Esfandiari, received a first-place prize of $18.3 million.

The 2006 World Series featured a much-anticipated HORSE tournament with a $50,000 buy-in, the highest ever for a single WSOP event.

Humberto Brenes, Phil Hellmuth, Chris Ferguson, and Alex Jacob tied for the most cashes during the WSOP, with eight each. Jeff Madsen, who won two events and made two other final tables (finishing 3rd both times), was named the 2006 WSOP Player of the Year (POTY). He barely edged Hellmuth, who also made four final tables.

== Events ==
There were 45 total events in the 2006 WSOP. Phil Hellmuth tied for the career bracelet lead with Doyle Brunson and Johnny Chan when he won his tenth career bracelet.

#	Date	Event	Entries	Winner	Prize	Runner-up	Results
1	June 26, 2006	$500 Casino Employees No Limit Hold'em	1,232	Chris Gros (1/1)	$127,616	Bryan Devonshire	Results
2	June 27, 2006	$1,500 No Limit Hold'em	2,776	Brandon Cantu (1/1)	$757,839	Phong Ly	Results
3	June 28, 2006	$1,500 Pot Limit Hold'em	1,102	Rafe Furst (1/1)	$345,984	Rocky Enciso	Results
4	June 29, 2006	$1,500 Limit Hold'em	1,068	Kianoush Abolfathi (1/1)	$335,289	Eric Buchman	Results
5	June 30, 2006	$2,500 No Limit Hold'em Short Handed 6/Table	824	Dutch Boyd (1/1)	$475,712	Joe Hachem (0/1)	Results
6	July 1, 2006	$2,000 No Limit Hold'em	1,919	Mark Vos (1/1)	$803,274	Nam Le	Results
7	July 2, 2006	$3,000 Limit Hold'em	415	Bill Chen (1/1)	$343,618	Yueqi Zhu	Results
8	July 3, 2006	$2,000 Omaha Hi-Lo (8 or better)	670	Jack Zwerner (1/1)	$341,426	Rusty Mandap	Results
9	July 4, 2006	$5,000 No Limit Hold'em	622	Jeff Cabanillas (1/1)	$818,546	Phil Hellmuth (0/9)	Results
10	July 5, 2006	$1,500 Seven-card stud	478	David Williams (1/1)	$163,118	John Hoang	Results
11	July 6, 2006	$1,500 Limit Hold'em	701	Bob Chalmers (1/1)	$258,344	Tam Ho	Results
12	July 6, 2006	$5,000 Omaha Hi-Lo (8 or better)	265	Sam Farha (1/2)	$398,560	Phil Ivey (0/5)	Results
13	July 7, 2006	$2,500 No Limit Hold'em	1,290	Max Pescatori (1/1)	$682,389	Anthony Reategui	Results
14	July 8, 2006	$1,000 No Limit Hold'em w/multiple rebuys	752	Allen Cunningham (1/4)	$625,830	David Rheem	Results
15	July 9, 2006	$1,000 Ladies No Limit Hold'em	1,128	Mary Jones Meyer (1/1)	$236,094	Shawnee Barton	Results
16	July 9, 2006	$10,000 Pot Limit Omaha	218	Lee Watkinson (1/1)	$655,746	Mike Guttman	Results
17	July 10, 2006	$1,000 No Limit Hold'em	2,891	Jon Friedberg (1/1)	$526,185	John Phan	Results
18	July 11, 2006	$2,000 Pot Limit Hold'em	590	Eric Kesselman (1/1)	$311,403	Hyon Kim	Results
19	July 12, 2006	$1,000 No Limit Hold'em Seniors	1,184	Clare Miller (1/1)	$247,814	Mike Nargi	Results
20	July 12, 2006	$50,000 H.O.R.S.E.	143	Chip Reese (1/3)	$1,716,000	Andy Bloch	Results
21	July 13, 2006	$2,500 No Limit Hold'em Short Handed 6/Table	740	Bill Chen (2/2)	$442,511	Nath Pizzolatto	Results
22	July 14, 2006	$2,000 No Limit Hold'em	1,579	Jeff Madsen (1/1)	$660,948	Paul Sheng	Results
23	July 15, 2006	$3,000 Limit Hold'em	341	Ian Johns (1/1)	$291,755	Jerrod Ankenman	Results
24	July 15, 2006	$3,000 Omaha Hi-Lo (8 or better)	352	Scott Clements (1/1)	$301,175	Thor Hansen (0/2)	Results
25	July 16, 2006	$2,000 No Limit Hold'em Shootout	600	David Pham (1/2)	$240,222	Charlie Sewell	Results
26A	July 17, 2006	$1,500 Pot Limit Omaha	526	Ralph Perry (1/1)	$207,817	George Abdallah	Results
26B	July 17, 2006	$1,500 Pot Limit Omaha w/rebuys	158	Eric Froehlich (1/2)	$299,675	Sherkhan Farnood	Results
27	July 18, 2006	$1,500 No Limit Hold'em	2,126	Mats Rahmn (1/1)	$655,141	Richard Toth	Results
28	July 19, 2006	$5,000 Seven-Card Stud	183	Benjamin Lin (1/1)	$256,620	Shawn Sheikhan	Results
29	July 19, 2006	$2,500 Pot Limit Hold'em	562	John Gale (1/1)	$374,849	Maros Lechman	Results
30	July 20, 2006	$5,000 No Limit Hold'em Short Handed 6/Table	507	Jeff Madsen (2/2)	$643,381	Erick Lindgren	Results
31	July 21, 2006	$2,000 No Limit Hold'em	2,050	Justin Scott (1/1)	$842,262	Freddy Rouhani	Results
32	July 22, 2006	$5,000 Pot Limit Hold'em	378	Jason Lester (1/1)	$550,746	Alan Sass	Results
33	July 22, 2006	$1,500 Razz	409	James Richburg (1/1)	$139,576	Carlos Mortensen (0/2)	Results
34	July 23, 2006	$1,000 No Limit Hold'em w/multiple rebuys	754	Phil Hellmuth (1/10)	$631,863	Juha Helppi	Results
35	July 24, 2006	$1,000 Seven Card Stud High-Low 8/OB	788	Pat Poels (1/2)	$172,091	Greg Dinkin	Results
36	July 24, 2006	$1,500 Limit Hold'em Shootout	524	Victoriano Perches (1/1)	$157,338	Arnold Spee	Results
37	July 25, 2006	$1,500 No Limit Hold'em	2,803	James Gorham (1/1)	$765,226	Osman Kibar	Results
38	July 25, 2006	$5,000 No-Limit 2–7 Draw Lowball w/rebuys	81	Daniel Alaei (1/1)	$430,698	David Williams (0/1)	Results
39	July 28, 2006	$10,000 No Limit Hold'em Championship	8,773	Jamie Gold (1/1)	$12,000,000	Paul Wasicka	Results
40	August 3, 2006	$1,000 No-Limit Hold'em	1,100	Praz Bansi (1/1)	$230,209	Anh Lu	Results
41	August 5, 2006	$1,500 No-Limit Hold'em	1,007	Paul Kobel (1/1)	$316,144	Tyler Andrews	Results
42	August 6, 2006	$1,500 No-Limit Hold'em	352	Jim Mitchell (1/1)	$153,173	Stuart Fox	Results
43	August 7, 2006	$1,500 No-Limit Hold'em	420	Kevin Nathan (1/1)	$171,987	J. C. Tran	Results
44	August 8, 2006	$1,500 No-Limit Hold'em	481	Kevin Cover (1/1)	$196,968	Joe Brandenburg	Results
45	August 9, 2006	$1,500 No-Limit Hold'em	494	Anders Henriksson (1/1)	$202,291	Maureen Feduniak	Results

== Main Event ==
The 2006 Main Event (event #39) remains the largest tournament in poker history by prize pool with a total prize pool of $82,512,162. The tournament, like every WSOP Main Event, is a $10,000 No-Limit Texas Hold'em event. Due to the 8,773-player field, there were four separate starting days (1A-1D), each playing down to 800 people. They were later combined into one other set of separate days (2A and 2B) before becoming one whole group. The field was whittled down to 9 players on August 8, and Jamie Gold was crowned World Champion on August 10. The final table of the "Main Event" was offered live on Pay-Per-View, but unlike ESPN telecasts, viewers at home could not see the hole cards of the players unless the player turned their cards over.

Along with the usual $10,000 chip stacks, a new feature to the WSOP was the "All-In" button. Tournament directors have informed the participants that the coin could be used in lieu of pushing all of one's chips into the pot.

The beige $50,000 chips that were used in 2005 were not used in 2006. Instead, tangerine and yellow $25,000 chips, in the design of the current $25 chips, were used. And for the first time in World Series of Poker History, a $100,000 chip was introduced on day 7. The chips were mint green with black edge spots in the design of the current yellow/black $1,000 chip. The 2006 WSOP Main Event remained as the largest Main Event in terms of entries and first-place prize until the 2023 WSOP Main Event.

=== Final table ===
Name	Number of chips (percentage of total)	WSOP Bracelets*	WSOP Cashes*	WSOP Earnings*
(United States) Jamie Gold	25,650,000 (28.5%)	0	0	0
(United States) Allen Cunningham	17,770,000 (19.7%)	4	28	$2,371,769
(United States) Richard Lee	11,820,000 (13.1%)	0	0	0
(Sweden) Erik Friberg	9,605,000 (10.7%)	0	0	0
(United States) Paul Wasicka	7,970,000 (8.8%)	0	2	$64,437
(United States) Doug Kim	6,770,000 (7.5%)	0	0	0
(United States) Rhett Butler	4,815,000 (5.3%)	0	0	0
(United States) Michael Binger	3,140,000 (3.5%)	0	1	$101,570
(United States) Dan Nassif	2,600,000 (2.9%)	0	0	0

*Career statistics prior to the beginning of the 2006 Main Event.

=== Final table results ===
Place	Name	Prize
1st	Jamie Gold	$12,000,000
2nd	Paul Wasicka	$6,102,499
3rd	Michael Binger	$4,123,310
4th	Allen Cunningham	$3,628,513
5th	Rhett Butler	$3,216,182
6th	Richard Lee	$2,803,851
7th	Douglas Kim	$2,391,520
8th	Erik Friberg	$1,979,189
9th	Dan Nassif	$1,566,858

=== Other high finishes ===
NB: This list is restricted to top 100 finishers with an existing Wikipedia entry.

Place	Name	Prize
10th	Fred Goldberg	$1,154,527
13th	William Thorson	$907,128
17th	Jeff Lisandro	$659,730
18th	David Einhorn	$659,730
20th	Prahlad Friedman	$494,797
24th	Eric Lynch	$494,797
29th	Mitch Schock	$329,865
36th	Humberto Brenes	$329,865
88th	Annie Duke	$51,129

=== Performance of past champions ===
Name	Championship Year(s)	Day of Elimination
Thomas "Amarillo Slim" Preston	1972	1
Doyle Brunson	1976, 1977	1
Bobby Baldwin	1978	1
Tom McEvoy	1983	4 (371st)
Berry Johnston	1986	2
Johnny Chan	1987, 1988	1
Phil Hellmuth	1989	1
Dan Harrington	1995	1
Huck Seed	1996	2
Scotty Nguyen	1998	2
Chris Ferguson	2000	3
Carlos Mortensen	2001	3
Robert Varkonyi	2002	2
Chris Moneymaker	2003	1
Greg Raymer	2004	2
Joe Hachem	2005	4 (238th)

=== Trivia ===
- Celebrity players featured in the Main Event included Hank Azaria, Paul Azinger, Charles Barkley, Richard Brodie, Dean Cain, Tony Cascarino, Denny Crum, Steve Davis, Shannon Elizabeth, Salvatore (Sully) Erna, James Garner, Brad Garrett, Michael Greco, Ron Jeremy, Joanna Krupa, Lennox Lewis, Matthew Lillard, Norm Macdonald, Tobey Maguire, Mekhi Phifer, Laura Prepon, Antonio Tarver, Wil Wheaton, and Jimmy White. Both Davis and Erna finished in the money, coming in 579th and 713th places respectively.

== Controversy ==
=== Event 5 ===
When play resumed during day 2 of this event, a table with players, Daniel Negreanu, Gavin Smith, and Kathy Liebert were given extra chips after tournament officials had misplaced Mirza Nagji's chips in the wrong seat. Unknowingly, the rest of the players assumed that this stack was someone else's who was late and blinded off the stack. Eventually a player noticed that the stack was Mirza Nagji's chips, who by that time had been given replacement chips. Players estimate that out of the extra 120,000 in chips that were put into play, around 10,000–11,000 in chips had already been blinded off from the empty stack.

=== Event 20 ===
Many poker players who entered into the HORSE event discovered that the cards they were playing with were marked or easily markable. Andy Bloch was assessed a 10‑minute penalty for crumpling a card when a dealer refused to replace the deck after the new deck that came in was rife with markings. When asked for comment, WSOP Commissioner Jeffrey Pollack said, "I hadn't heard anything about the cards being marked until today. I am looking into getting more fresh setups and I am definitely working on solving the problem."

=== Event 25 ===
During Event 25, the $2,000 NL Hold 'em Shootout, the structure was changed mid-tournament from a full table into a 6-handed table event. Harry Demetriou, who had been playing in the event, objected to the change in format citing that a shootout should be 9, 10 or 11 handed, yelling about the unfair change in structure. Harry was eventually ejected from the tournament and was later refunded his money. Daniel Negreanu missed the event completely because he assumed that the event would be a full table and he would be able to come into the tournament a little bit later after sleeping in. However, by the time he showed up David Singer had won his table after blinding off Negreanu's stack.

== See also ==
- 2006 World Series of Poker Results
- World Series of Poker circuit events
- World Series of Poker Tournament of Champions
