= Burt Boutin =

American poker player

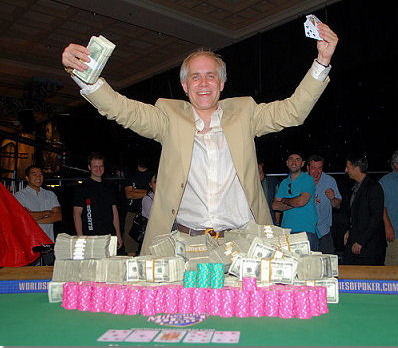
- Boutin, after winning the $5,000 Pot Limit Omaha w/rb event. at the 2007 World Series of Poker

World Series of Poker
- Bracelets: 2
- Money finishes: 15
- Highest WSOP Main Event finish: 90th, 2004

World Poker Tour
- Title: None
- Final table: 1
- Money finishes: 6

Burton A. Boutin is a professional poker player from Henderson, Nevada who has won two World Series of Poker bracelets. He also finished in second place at the 2006 Mandalay Bay Poker Championship winning $604,765. Boutin is known for drinking "Red Bull" at the poker table and acting a little hyper between hands. During the final table of the 2007 WSOP $5,000 Pot Limit Omaha event, WSOP commentator Norman Chad referred to him as "Red Bull Burt".

During the 2001 World Series of Poker $2,000 Pot Limit Hold'em event, Boutin won his first bracelet after he had defeated Dave Ulliott heads-up. When he won his second bracelet in 2007, Ulliott was again at the final table, this time finishing third.

As of 2009, Boutin's total live tournament winnings exceed $2,200,000. His 15 cashes at the WSOP account for $1,308,253 of those winnings.

== World Series of Poker bracelets ==
Year	Tournament	Prize (US$)
2001	$2,000 Pot Limit Hold'em	$193,800
2007	$5,000 Pot Limit Omaha w/Rebuys	$825,956
