= John Phan =

Vietnamese-American poker player (born 1974)

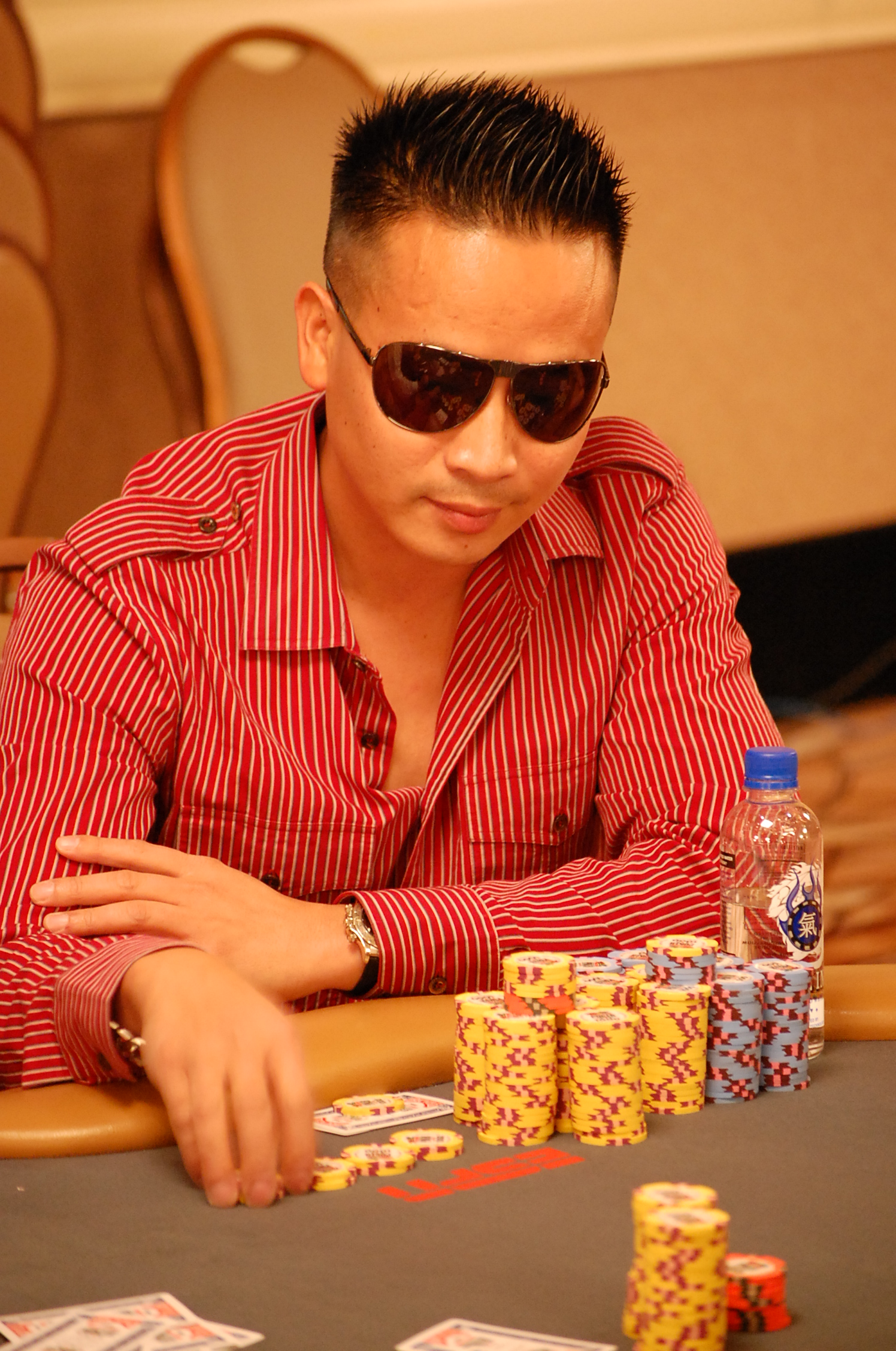
- Phan at the 2008 World Series of Poker
- Nickname: The Razor
- Born: October 10, 1974 (age 52)

World Series of Poker
- Bracelets: 2
- Money finishes: 29
- Highest WSOP Main Event finish: 149th, 2012

World Poker Tour
- Title: 1
- Final tables: 4
- Money finishes: 11

Bon "John" Phan (born October 10, 1974, in Da Nang, Vietnam) is a Vietnamese-American professional poker player based in Stockton, California, who is a two-time World Series of Poker bracelet winner and is a winner and four-time final tablist of World Poker Tour Championships.

== World Series of Poker ==
Phan has made numerous World Series of Poker (WSOP) money finishes, including the final table of the $5,000 Seven-card stud event in 2005, finished fourth and outlasted both professional poker players Dave Colclough and Rob Hollink.

At the 2006 WSOP, Phan finished second in the $1,000 No-Limit Hold'em event when his Q♠ 5♠ failed to improve against Jon Friedberg's A♥ 7♥ on a board of 10♥ 9♦ 3♠ 2♥ 7♠. Phan earned $289,389 for his runner-up finish. The next year at the 2007 World Series of Poker Phan was runner-up to Francois Safieddine in the $2,500 No Limit Hold'em event, earning $330,846 but it was not until the 2008 World Series of Poker that Phan won his first bracelet after winning the $3,000 No-Limit Hold'em event, earning $434,789 and then he won his second bracelet the same year, this time in the $2,500 2-7 Triple Draw event, earning $151,896. Phan cashed for a total of $608,464 at the 2008 WSOP.

=== World Series of Poker bracelets ===
Year	Event	Prize Money
2008	$3,000 No-Limit Hold'em	$434,789
2008	$2,500 2-7 Triple Draw	$151,896

== World Poker Tour ==
Phan cashed eleven times on the World Poker Tour (WPT) making the final table in four of them, one was at the $25,000 WPT Championship of season 3, receiving $518,920 for finishing in fourth place above Hollink, Phil Ivey, Joe Beevers, Chris Ferguson and Juha Helppi. The other was at the $9,600 No Limit Hold'em WPT season 6 event at the 2008 Bay 101 Shooting Stars where he finished 6th, earning $135,000. In July 2008, Phan made another WPT final table finishing in fifth place at the Bellagio Cup IV, earning $193,915

On the WPT seventh season, Phan won his first WPT title after defeating well known online player Amit "Amak316″ Makhija during heads-up play, winning the WPT bracelet and over $1.1 million at the Legends of Poker held at The Bicycle Casino in Bell Gardens, California.

== Other poker events ==
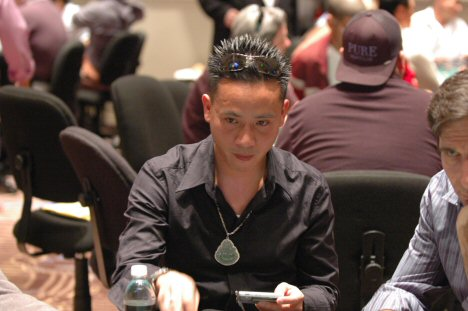
John Phan at Nicky Hilton's poker tournament

Phan won two events at The Fifth Annual Jack Binion World Poker Open in 2004, the $500 Limit Hold'em event, earning $160,965 and $500 Pot Limit Hold'em event, earning $85,257 also cashing three other times at that same event. He later won the $3,000 No Limit Hold'em event at the Festa al Lago II in 2004, earning $189,900. He won the $2,425 No Limit Hold'em event at the 2005 L.A. Poker Classic, earning $300,578 and was runner-up to Marcel Lüske in the $3,000 No Limit Hold'em event at the Fourth Annual Five-Star World Poker Classic in 2006, earning $179,195.

As of 2017, his total live tournament winnings exceed $5,525,000. His 29 cashes as the WSOP account for over $1,450,000 of those winnings.

He was the Cardplayer Magazine 2008 Player of the Year with 6,704 points as well as 2008 Bluff Magazine Player of the Year.
