= Jamie Gold =

American poker player, television producer, and talent agent (born 1969)

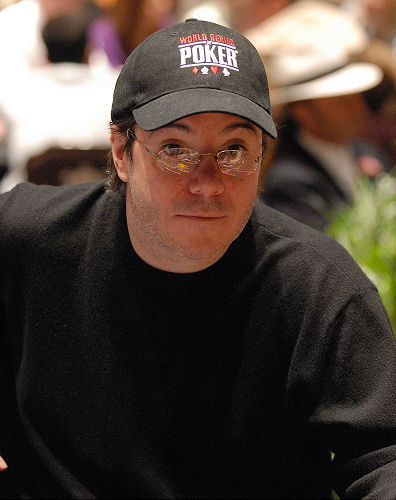
- Gold at the 2006 World Series of Poker
- Born: August 25, 1969 (age 57)

World Series of Poker
- Bracelet: 1
- Money finishes: 5
- Highest WSOP Main Event finish: Winner, 2006

Jamie M. Gold (born August 25, 1969) is an American television producer, talent agent, and poker player, based in Malibu, California and known for winning the 2006 World Series of Poker (WSOP) Main Event. He divides his time between his activities as president of production for the entertainment company, Buzznation and poker competition, primarily major tournaments.

== Early years ==
Gold was born in Kansas City, Missouri, as Jamie M. Usher and moved to Manhattan as a young child with his mother. His name was later changed by court order to Jamie M. Gold following his mother's divorce and remarriage to Dr. Robert Gold. The family moved to Paramus, New Jersey, where Gold was raised by his mother and her second husband. He graduated from Paramus High School in 1987. He later earned a bachelor's degree from the State University of New York at Albany in 1991, and studied entertainment law at UCLA.

== Entertainment business ==
At the age of 16, Gold began his career in the entertainment business as an intern at the J. Michael Bloom & Associates Talent Agency. He became a talent agent before he was 21, but soon moved into management/production. Gold's clients have included Jimmy Fallon and others.

In 2014, Jamie Gold was part of the launch of the "Island Breeze", a refurbished ship turned into a casino off the coast of Palm Beach, USA.

== Philanthropy ==
Over a span of ten years Gold focused on philanthropy, raising over half a billion dollars. He has hosted or worked closely on nearly 300 celebrity charity events.

Gold has also participated in numerous poker tournaments that have been designed primarily to benefit charitable causes. Allowing himself to be auctioned off, making special appearances, or by purchasing buy-ins, Gold has been involved with a wide variety of causes, including WSOP "Ante Up For Africa", Annie Duke's charity poker tournament, and a few others. He has also mentioned in several recent interviews his plans to create a charity poker tournament to benefit people affected with Lou Gehrig's disease.

== Poker ==
Gold's interest in poker began as a youngster. His mother, Jane, was a keen poker player, and his grandfather was a champion gin rummy player. Gold's most serious efforts to improve his recreational poker exploits came about when he began working with former WSOP main event winners Johnny Chan and Chris Moneymaker on an upcoming television show, and Chan began to mentor Gold in poker. In 2005, Gold began regularly playing in poker tournaments. In April 2005 at the Bicycle Casino, he won his first major no limit Texas hold 'em tournament, earning $54,225. Over the next 12 months, Gold had seven more in the money finishes in California tournaments. A neighbor of 2000 WSOP main event winner Chris Ferguson, Gold has said in numerous interviews that Ferguson was one of the few professionals to endorse his poker style during the 2006 Main Event tournament, which he eventually won. While many pros criticized Gold's play in the later stages of the tournament, Ferguson urged him to stick with his own perfected style as he progressed deep into the money. Gold favored pressuring all of the players at the table especially when playing in position (being among the last to act in a betting round). Bluff magazine, a major poker trade publication has analyzed Gold's winning poker strategies as follows: "He forced his tablemates to risk their entire stack time after time. If they reraised him, he either knew they were holding the nuts and folded, or he sniffed out a bluff and forced them all in," thus "he transformed this strategy into an art form."

=== 2006 World Series of Poker ===
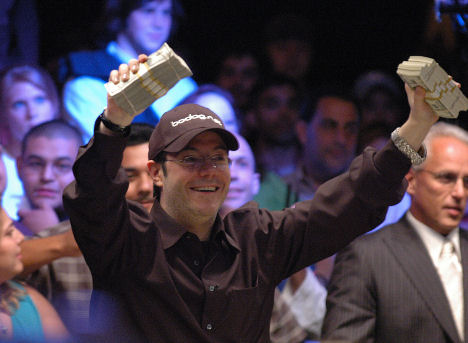
Jamie Gold after winning the 2006 World Series of Poker main event.

At the 2006 WSOP, Gold maintained a significant chip lead from Day 4 onwards to win the World Series of Poker Main Event (No Limit Texas hold 'em, $10,000 buy-in), outlasting 8,772 other players. Excluding fourth-place finisher Allen Cunningham, Gold had more casino tournament final table finishes than the rest of his final table opponents combined. Gold eliminated seven of his eight opponents at the final table. Gold defeated Paul Wasicka heads-up, earning a record $12,000,000 when in the final hand his Q♠ 9♣ made a pair with the board of Q♣ 8♥ 5♥. Wasicka held 10♥ 10♠ and did not improve with the A♦ on the turn and 4♣ on the river. Gold won the event despite earlier saying that he would prefer to finish second, as he felt uncomfortable with the idea of being famous. Gold ate blueberries during the play of the 2006 WSOP main event final table and joked in a post-tournament interview that the blueberries were "brain food" and the reason he won. Gold's WSOP win was marked by an uncanny ability to goad his opponents into either calling his bets when he had an unbeatable hand or folding to him when he was weak. He consistently told his opponents that he was weak or strong, telling the truth sometimes, and sometimes lying, with the net result of successfully deceiving his opponents most of the time. Prior to the 2006 WSOP Main Event win, Gold had compiled a solid record in tournament competition, using lessons learned from poker legend and previous two-time WSOP main event winner and owner of 10 WSOP bracelets, Johnny Chan.

Gold's "table talk", though both an asset and a source of criticism for his tendency to tell opponents his actual hand during play, was contrary to WSOP rules. In one case at the final table, Gold actually flashed one of his hole cards to an opponent (a face card), creating enough uncertainty that his opponent folded the better hand. However, Gold was never penalized for any rules infraction. Prior to his elimination in the 2007 WSOP, Gold was issued a warning for his tactics.

Immediately after his WSOP win, Gold called his stepfather, Dr. Robert I. Gold, who could not attend as he was suffering from Lou Gehrig's disease. Gold pledged to use his winnings to make his stepfather more comfortable. His stepfather died four months later on December 13, 2006.

=== Winnings controversy ===
Just prior to the 2006 WSOP, Bodog.com Entertainment and Gold entered into a business relationship when Gold agreed to find celebrities willing to play in the main event under the Bodog banner in exchange for a paid entry into the main event. Gold partnered with Crispin Leyser to help with this task in exchange for half of Gold's winnings, according to Leyser. After Gold won, Leyser says that Gold reneged on the deal and had decided to keep the entire $12 million prize. Leyser sued Gold on August 22, 2006, which resulted in Chief U.S. District Court Judge Kathy Hardcastle issuing a restraining order which prevented Gold from collecting $6 million of his winnings from Rio Hotel and Casino before the first hearing of the lawsuit on December 1, 2006. At the December court hearing, U.S. District Court Judge Roger L. Hunt rejected a motion by Gold's lawyers to lift the restraining order on the $6 million and ordered the frozen funds be moved into an interest-bearing account, saying that the "likelihood to prevail" lay with Leyser. Gold did a radio interview on Rounders the Poker Show following his Main Event win where he mentioned his deal with Leyser. It was later entered into evidence for the lawsuit. On February 6, 2007, Leyser and Gold released a joint statement stating they had settled the matter outside of court. The amount of the settlement was not disclosed. On January 25, 2007, Bodog ended their business relationship with Gold, citing their decision to cease all offline marketing initiatives in the U.S., and instead refocus their efforts on growing their entertainment brand in Europe and Asia.

=== Post 2006 Win ===
Following his success at the 2006 WSOP, Gold appeared on televised poker shows including episodes of NBC's Poker After Dark and on GSN's High Stakes Poker. Gold returned to defend his title at the 2007 WSOP, but was eliminated on the first day. He had more success in the 2007 WSOP Europe, where he finished 35th in the Main Event. Since then, he has cashed for smaller amounts on the professional poker scene, playing mainly at the WSOP. Since his Main Event victory in 2006, his largest cash came in the 2016 Los Angeles WSOP Circuit Main Event, where he finished runner-up and claimed $139,820. As of 2023, his live tournaments winnings exceed $12,600,000, stemming mainly from his 2006 Main Event victory.

World Series of Poker Bracelet
Year	Tournament	Prize (US$)
2006	$10,000 No Limit Hold 'em World Championship	$12,000,000
