= Erik Friberg (poker player) =

Swedish poker player (born 1983)

- Nickname: Lirarerik
- Born: 31 March 1983 (age 43)

World Series of Poker
- Bracelet: None
- Money finishes: 3
- Highest WSOP Main Event finish: 8th, 2006

World Poker Tour
- Title: None
- Final table: None
- Money finishes: 2

European Poker Tour
- Title: None
- Final table: None
- Money finishes: 2

Erik Friberg (born 31 March 1983) is a poker player from Stockholm, Sweden

Friberg's first major success in poker came in the 2006 World Series of Poker Main Event, where he finished in 8th place earning $1,979,189. Since then, Friberg participated in the 2007 World Series of Poker, with his biggest finish there being a 3rd-place finish in the $5,000 No Limit Hold'em – Six Handed event, he won $345,582 for his finish.

As of 2009, his total live tournament winnings exceed $2,700,000. His three cashes at the WSOP account for $2,445,927 of those winnings. Friberg plays at PokerStars under the name "lirarerik".
