= Thor Hansen =

Norwegian poker player (1947–2018)

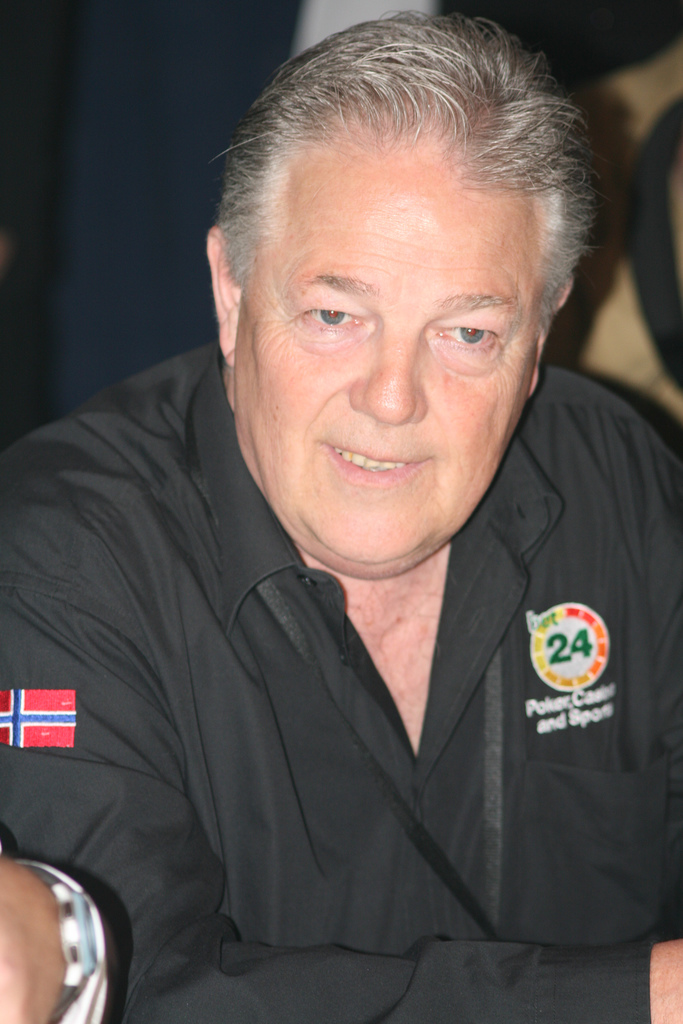
- Hansen at the EPT Monte Carlo (Grand Final) in 2008
- Nickname: Betan (Lille Betan)
- Born: 23 June 1947; Oslo, Norway
- Died: 5 December 2018 (aged 71)

World Series of Poker
- Bracelets: 2
- Money finishes: 46
- Highest WSOP Main Event finish: 21st, 1998

World Poker Tour
- Title: None
- Final table: None
- Money finishes: 4

European Poker Tour
- Title: None
- Final table: None
- Money finishes: 2

Thor Harald Hansen (23 June 1947 – 5 December 2018) was a Norwegian professional poker player. He was recruited by Larry Flynt to play poker for him after Hansen played against him in Las Vegas in the mid-1990s. He has two WSOP bracelets, one from the 1988 WSOP in Seven-card stud, and then later in Deuce to Seven Lowball in the 2002 WSOP. He finished in the money four times during the 2006 WSOP, coming in second place in the $3,000 Omaha Hi/Lo event.

== Biography ==
He was part owner of the company Poker Blue and was awarded the first Norwegian Poker Player of the Year award in 2005. He was considered by many Norwegian poker players as their "Godfather".

In 2007, Hansen cashed in the money at the $10,000 No Limit Hold'em Main Event coming in 134th place out of a field of 6,358 players, winning $58,570, and finished in 8th at the $50,000 H.O.R.S.E event, earning an additional $188,256. As of 2009, his total live tournament winnings exceeded $2,600,000. His 46 WSOP cashes account for $1,165,960 of his total winnings.

In 1999, Thor married Marcella Braswell on Catalina Island, California. The couple divided their time between California and Las Vegas, Nevada.

Hansen was diagnosed with terminal cancer and went through chemotherapy treatment. Hansen died on 5 December 2018.

== WSOP Bracelets ==
Year	Tournament	Prize
1988	$5,000 Seven-card stud	$158,000
2002	$1,500 Deuce-to-Seven	$62,600
