= Jack Zwerner =

American businessman (born 1938)

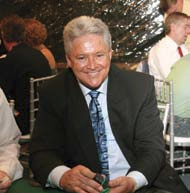
- Zwerner at the Sky Las Vegas Celebrity Poker Challenge
- Nickname: Jack 'Action' Zwerner

World Series of Poker
- Bracelet: 1
- Money finish: 1

Jack 'Action' Zwerner was an American businessman and poker player. He is known for winning the 2006 World Series of Poker (WSOP) Event 8: Omaha Hi-Lo (8 or better). T. J. Cloutier called him "the best heads-up Omaha player ever".

Zwerner was an executive at the Dunes Hotel, Caesar's Palace the Golden Nugget, and the Las Vegas Hilton.

Until his win at the WSOP, Jack Zwerner was known as a big cash game player.

With the final hand won, he received his first World Series of Poker bracelet and $341,426.
