= BARGE =

Gambling convention in Las Vegas

- Status: Active
- Genre: Convention
- Date: First weekend in August
- Venue: The Orleans (since 2025)
- Locations: Las Vegas, Nevada, U.S.
- Country: United States
- Inaugurated: 1991
- Attendance: 200
- Website: Official website

BARGE, the Big August Rec.Gambling Excursion, is a yearly convention held in Las Vegas during the summer, usually a weekend in late July or the first weekend of August. It consists of a series of tournaments both of poker and other gambling games, as well as a banquet and a host of informal social and gambling activities organized by attendees. Some of the well-known poker players who have participated either as speakers or players in the no limit holdem tournament include: Howard Lederer, Chris Ferguson, Phil Hellmuth Jr, Greg Raymer, Mason Malmuth, David Sklansky, Mike Caro, Matt Matros, Linda Johnson, Phil Gordon, Paul Phillips, Andy Bloch, William Chen, Doyle Brunson and many others.

BARGE is formally open to "members of the rec.gambling" community, but registration must be done in advance over the Internet. BARGE organizers include Russell Fox, Rich Bremer, Jeff Deitch, Sharon Goldman, and Stevan Goldman. Former organizers include Chuck “Enabler” Weinstock, Peter “Foldem” Secor, Michael "mickdog" Patterson, Nick Christenson, Bree Goldman and Mike Zimmers.

== BARGE history ==
The first BARGE was an informal gathering of a small number of participants of the rec.gambling newsgroup in Las Vegas in 1991 during SIGGRAPH, a computer graphics convention. The next year, many of the same players got together and had a poker tournament at The Mirage. The poker tournament was No Limit Hold'em (as it still is, while additional poker tournaments have been added), and nine players participated. Since then, BARGE has been held at various Las Vegas locations (see below for a list). Attendance has grown steadily, averaging about 200 participants.

In its earlier years, BARGE attendees were interested in Blackjack as much as they were in Poker. Some famous Blackjack players (card counters) who have attended BARGE include Andy Bloch, Stanford Wong, Arnold Snyder and 'Mr. M.' Since around 1998, BARGE attendees and BARGE activities have centered much more around Poker.

In 2006 BARGE was moved to later in the month of August due to a conflict with the World Series of Poker as some attendees participated in both events. Since then BARGE has returned to its traditional 1st weekend of August.

BARGE 2020 was held entirely online with a full slate of tournaments hosted on a site created by an ARG participant.

BARGE is the progenitor of all the other annual "ARG" events, including ATLARGE (held in Atlantic City), ESCARGOT (held in the Los Angeles area), FARGO (held in Connecticut, prior to 2014 at Foxwoods, now at Mohegan Sun), MARGE (held in Biloxi), EMBARGO (Winter Las Vegas event) and others.

== BARGE traditions ==
Traditions are extremely important to BARGE. For example, Scottro (a prominent BARGE participant) denied that his much-washed originally red hat was actually pink, resulting in dozens of players wearing pink baseball hats at the 2006 BARGE, held at the Venetian. "To Throw Down the Pink Hat" has subsequently come to mean "to challenge someone to a heads-up poker match."

Perhaps the most famous BARGE tradition is "Presto!" as a nickname for a hold'em hand of pocket fives. The term was originated by Frank Irwin (as slang for a blackjack) but its poker meaning is far more widespread, making appearances on multiple sets of commemorative chips, badges, etc.

Other BARGE traditions include multiple poker tournaments, a blackjack tournament, a video poker tournament, the Official ADB Craps Crawl, a Sushi outing with Sake tasting, the Unofficial BARGE Smoker and Bourbon Tasting, Karaoke night, and the only known Chowaha games played in casino settings for real money. Chinese Poker has also been played at BARGE for many years.

After the BARGE banquet on Saturday evening, another tradition is played out. 'Reindeer games' – various exotic poker games—are spread. These games include or have included Chowaha, first spread at Binion's in 1997; Binglaha (a variant of Omaha, in which whether the game is played high-only or high/low is determined after the flop betting by a roll of a die), first spread at Binion's in 2003; 'Must-drink, must-toke HORSE'; and Lowball. Many games from attendees’ home games are also played. Murder, Oklahoma, and many other games (mostly Omaha variations) are common.

Whenever anyone busts out of a BARGE tournament, they are given a round of applause—-not as an ironic gesture, but as a thank-you for participating in BARGE. Many players also bring a "bust-out gift," which they give to the player who busted them. These are typically small, memorable tokens, but have included such gifts as a decoupage "Last Supper" featuring Chris "Jesus" Ferguson (the late Don Perry's gift in 2005, the year he won) and an iPad (JK Scheinberg's gift in 2010).

The winner of the No-Limit tournament is traditionally tasked with designing a set of chips for next year's BARGE, with some sort of commemorative design. These chip sets are then sold the next year. The BARGE Chip Committee, currently headed by Patrick Milligan (circa 2008), helps the winner with the logistics and artwork.

== BARGE guest speakers and BARGE locations ==
Most years, the annual banquet features a guest speaker. Past speakers:

- 1993 – Rio – none
- 1994 – Luxor – none
- 1995 – Binion's – Mason Malmuth
- 1996 – Binion's – Mike Caro
- 1997 – Binion's – Arnold Snyder
- 1998 – Binion's – Mike Caro
- 1999 – Orleans – Mike Sexton
- 2000 – Binion's – Chris Ferguson
- 2001 – Binion's – Phil Hellmuth
- 2002 – Binion's – Linda Johnson – Steve Lipscomb "World Poker Tour Preview"
- 2003 – Binion's – Howard Lederer
- 2004 – Binion's – Greg Raymer
- 2005 – Plaza – Wil Wheaton
- 2006 – Venetian – Phil Gordon "Being Highly Overrated"
- 2007 – Binion's – Gavin Smith
- 2008 – Binion's – Tom Schneider
- 2009 – Binion's – Doyle Brunson
- 2010 – Binion's – Barry Tannebaum
- 2011 – Binion's – Mori Eskandani
- 2012 – Binion's – Karina Jett
- 2013 – Binion's – Stanford Wong (Friday)
- 2014 – Binion's – Mickey Appleman
- 2015 – Binion's – Jennifer Shahade
- 2016 – Binion's – Daniel Negreanu
- 2017 – Binion's – Thomas Gallagher
- 2018 – Binion's – J.P. Massar
- 2019 – Green Valley Ranch – Adam Pliska
- 2022 – Westgate – Blair Rodman
- 2023 – Westgate – Jan Fischer
- 2024 – Westgate – Yosh Nakano
- 2025 – Orleans – Chris Wallace
- 2026 - Orleans – Matt Savage

== BARGE No-Limit Hold 'em Champions ==
- 1992 – Steve Jacobs
- 1993 – Roy Hashimoto
- 1994 – Dave Hughes
- 1995 – Tom Sims
- 1996 – Mike Zimmers
- 1997 – Steve Brecher
- 1998 – Lee Jones
- 1999 – John Harkness
- 2000 – Jeff Bartoszewicz
- 2001 – Russ Fox
- 2002 – Mike McBride
- 2003 – Paul Person
- 2004 – Gavin Smith
- 2005 – Don Perry
- 2006 – Mordecai Schwartz
- 2007 – John Pickels
- 2008 – Dan Chevrie
- 2009 – David Heller
- 2010 – Chuck Humphrey
- 2011 – Rich Bremer
- 2012 – Paul McMullin
- 2013 – David Lawful
- 2014 – Andreas Wolfram
- 2015 – Jennifer Shahade
- 2016 – Becca Kerl
- 2017 – Chris Mecklin
- 2018 – Don Rieck
- 2019 – Scott Harker
- 2020 – Russ Fox (1st repeat winner)*
- 2021 – Sabyl Landrum
- 2022 – Jesse Capps
- 2023 – Rich Bremer (1st repeat live event winner)
- 2024 – Tim Showalter
- 2025 – Gillian Groves
- 2026 – David Heller

* - online free event
