= Mary Jones Meyer =

American poker player

World Series of Poker
- Bracelet: 1
- Money finishes: 15
- Highest WSOP Main Event finish: 1058, 2024

Mary Jones Meyer is a World Series of Poker champion in the 2006 $1,000 Ladies - No-Limit Hold'em poker event.

As of 2024, her total WSOP tournament winnings exceed $350,000.

== World Series of Poker bracelets ==
Year	Tournament	Prize (US$)
2006	$1,000 Ladies - No-Limit Hold'em	$236,094
