= Freddy Rouhani =

Iranian-American poker player

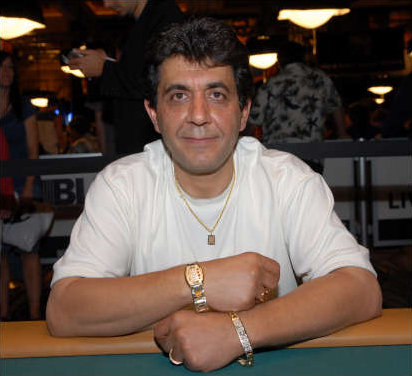
- Rouhani after winning the $2,500 Omaha/Seven Card Stud Hi-Low-8 or Better event at the 2008 World Series of Poker
- Born: Farzad Rouhani; 1963 or 1964 (age 62–63); Iran

World Series of Poker
- Bracelet: 1
- Money finishes: 13
- Highest WSOP Main Event finish: 293rd, 2005

World Poker Tour
- Title: None
- Final table: None
- Money finishes: 2

Farzad "Freddy" Rouhani (Persian: فرزاد روحانی, born 1963 or 1964) is an American professional poker player who won the 2008 World Series of Poker $2,500 Omaha/Seven Card Stud Hi-Low-8 or Better event.

Rouhani, who was born in Iran, came to the United States in 1985 to attend medical school, but became a professional poker player instead. He currently resides in Germantown, Maryland.

== World Series of Poker ==
Rouhani has seven cashes at the World Series of Poker (WSOP), His largest cash was when he finished runner-up to Justin Scott in the $2,000 No Limit Hold'em event at the 2006 World Series of Poker, earning $429,065. His highest finish at the Main Event was 293rd place at the 2005 World Series of Poker, earning $24,365. At the 2008 World Series of Poker, he won his first bracelet in the $2,500 Omaha/Seven Card Stud Hi-Low-8 or Better event, earning $232,911.

=== World Series of Poker bracelets ===
Year	Event	Prize Money
2008	$2,500 Omaha/Seven Card Stud Hi-Low-8 or Better	$232,911

As of 2023, his total live tournament winnings exceed $1,800,000. His 13 cashes at the WSOP account for $1,328,985 of those winnings.
