= Jeff Madsen =

American poker player (born 1985)

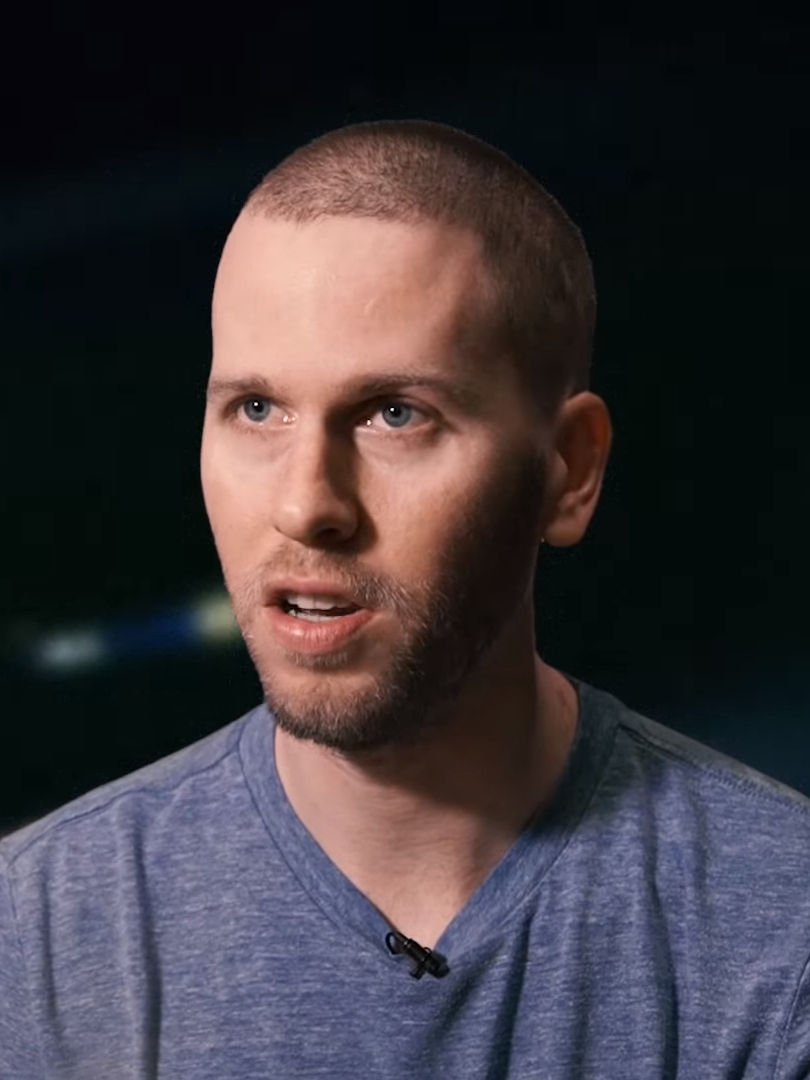
- Madsen in 2016

World Series of Poker
- Bracelets: 4
- Money finishes: 132
- Highest WSOP Main Event finish: 102nd, 2019

World Poker Tour
- Title: None
- Final tables: 2
- Money finishes: 16
- North American Poker Tour
- Final table(s): 2
- Money finish(es): 4

Jeff Madsen (born June 7, 1985) is a four-time World Series of Poker bracelet winner and the 2006 World Series of Poker Player of the Year.

== Early life and education ==
Madsen was born in Santa Monica, California and raised in Pacific Palisades, Los Angeles. He graduated from Palisades Charter High School. Madsen matriculated at the University of California, Santa Barbara to study film. Despite originally wanting to finish his degree, Madsen dropped out of college in his final year to fully focus on his poker career.

== Poker career ==
Madsen was introduced to the game of poker after graduating high school. While a student at UCSB, he began playing casino poker at the Chumash Casino in Santa Ynez, California, where the minimum age to play is 18.

Madsen won a no limit Texas hold 'em event at the 2006 World Series of Poker just 3 years later. At the age of 21 years and five weeks, he was about six weeks younger than the previous record holder, Eric Froehlich, who won his first WSOP bracelet in 2005. Madsen's victory earned him $660,948. At that time he was the youngest World Series of Poker winner in history until Steve Billirakis became the youngest at the age of 21 years 11 days the following year.

Less than two weeks before his victory, Madsen finished third in the $2,000 Omaha high-low split event, winning $97,552. Just six days after his first victory, Madsen won his second WSOP title, and $643,381, in the $5,000 no limit hold 'em shorthanded event. A few days later he finished third in the $1,000 Seven-card stud high low split event, earning $65,971, adding up to an unprecedented four top 3 finishes, in four different poker variants, in his first year at the WSOP. His showing prompted Full Tilt Poker to bring him in as a sponsored pro.

In 2007, Madsen cashed in his first WPT event, finishing eighth at the Bay 101 Shooting Star Championship.

On February 5, 2010, Madsen won the $3,500 buy-in Championship Event at the Borgata Winter Open in Atlantic City, NJ winning $625,006.

At the 2026 WSOP, Madsen won his fifth career bracelet in a $1,500 Dealer's Choice Event for $161,057.

As of 2022, Madsen's tournament winnings exceed $6,000,000. His 132 cashes at the WSOP account for $3,409,063 of those winnings.

== Personal life ==
Madsen lives in Las Vegas.

== WSOP Bracelets ==
Year	Tournament	Prize (US$)
2006	$2,000 No Limit Hold'em	$660,948
2006	$5,000 No Limit Hold'em Short Handed 6/Table	$643,381
2013	$3,000 Pot Limit Omaha	$384,420
2015	$3,000 Pot Limit Omaha Hi-Lo 8 or Better	$301,413
2026	$1,500 Dealer's Choice	$161,057
