= James Richburg =

American poker player

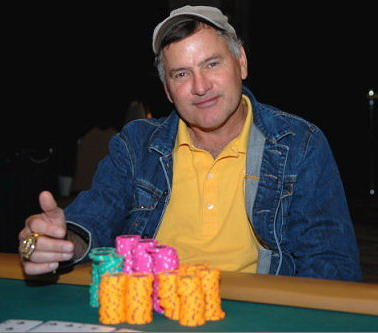
- Richburg at the 2007 World Series of Poker
- Nickname: Mason

World Series of Poker
- Bracelets: 2
- Final tables: 4
- Money finishes: 16
- Highest WSOP Main Event finish: None

James Richburg is an American poker player residing from Long Beach, California.

Richburg has won two World Series of Poker bracelets. The first came in the razz event in 2006. He won his second in the $2,500 HORSE event in 2007.

As of 2017, Richburg's total live tournament cashes exceed $525,000.

== World Series of Poker Bracelets ==
Year	Tournament	Prize (US$)
2006	$1,500 Razz	$139,576
2007	$2,500 H.O.R.S.E.	$238,881
