= Nam Le (poker player) =

American poker player (born 1980)

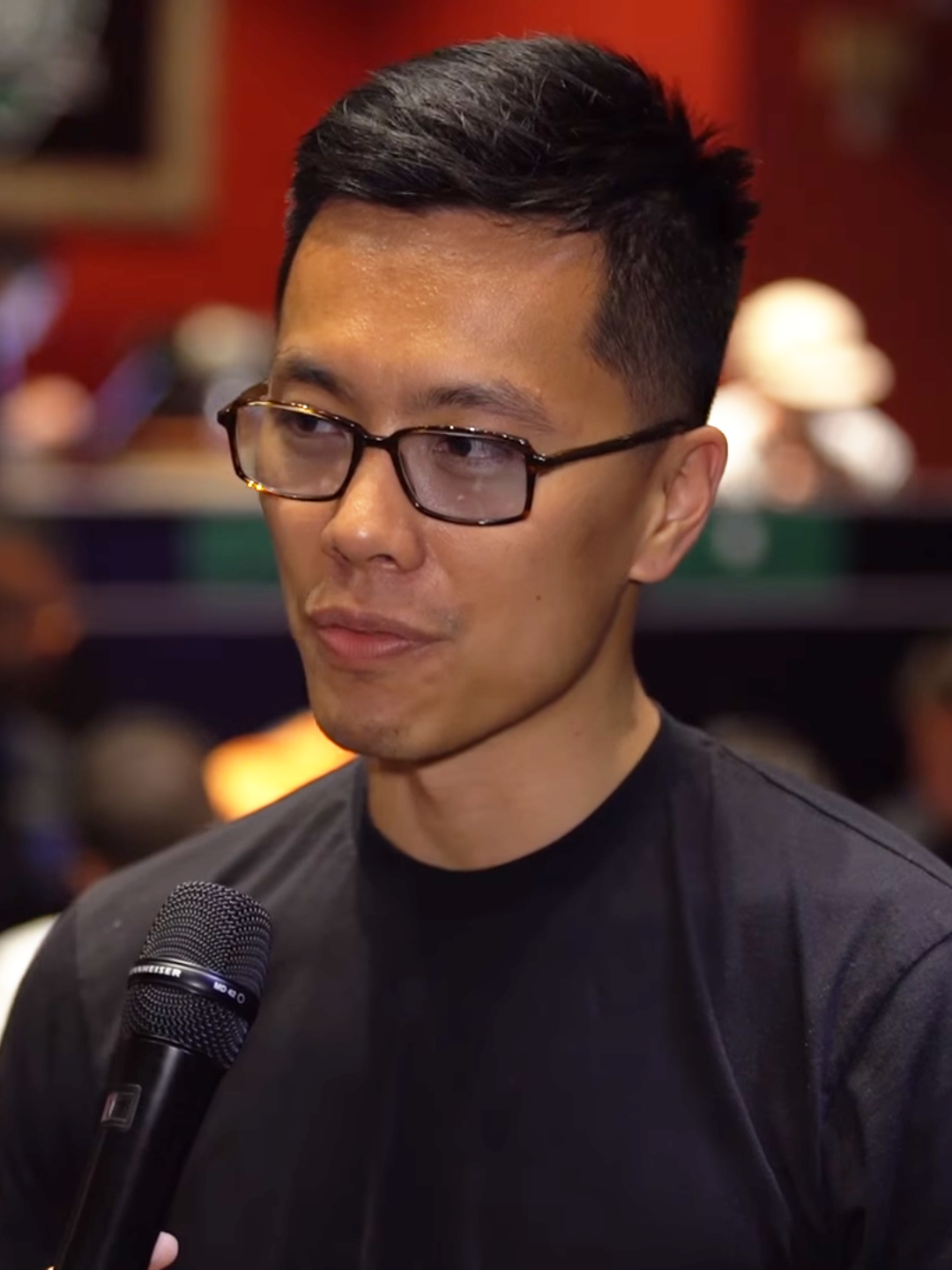
- Nam Le at the 2016 WPT Tournament of Champions
- Born: Nam Thien Le; September 10, 1980 (age 46); Irvine, California, U.S.

World Series of Poker
- Money finishes: 16
- Highest WSOP Main Event finish: 736th, 2017

World Poker Tour
- Title: 1
- Final tables: 6
- Money finishes: 16

Nam Thien Le (born September 10, 1980 in Irvine, California) is an American professional poker player from Huntington Beach, California.

On March 3, 2006, Le won the World Poker Tour (WPT) fourth season Bay 101 Shooting Star event.

In 2008 he took down the HK$150,000 No Limit Hold'em – High Rollers Event of APPT – Macau for HK$3,700,000 ($473,915).

As of August 2014, his total live tournament winnings exceed $6,800,000. His 24 cashes at the WSOP account for $854,337 of those winnings.
