= Outline of poker =

Overview of and topical guide to poker

The following outline is provided as an overview of and topical guide to poker:

Poker – family of card games that share betting rules and usually (but not always) hand rankings. Poker games differ in how the cards are dealt, how hands may be formed, whether the high or low hand wins the pot in a showdown (in some games, the pot is split between the high and low hands), limits on bet sizes, and how many rounds of betting are allowed.

== Nature of poker ==
Poker can be described as all of the following:

- Game – structured playing, usually undertaken for enjoyment and sometimes used as an educational tool. Games are distinct from work, which is usually carried out for remuneration, and from art, which is more often an expression of aesthetic or ideological elements. However, the distinction is not clear-cut, and many games are also considered to be work (such as professional players of spectator sports/games) or art (such as jigsaw puzzles or games involving an artistic layout such as Mahjong, solitaire, or some video games).
  - Card game
- Sport – an organized, competitive, entertaining, and skillful activity requiring commitment, strategy, and fair play, in which a winner can be defined by objective means. It is governed by a set of rules or customs.
  - Mind sport – a game where the outcome is determined

== Equipment of the game ==
- Playing cards
- Poker chips

== Rules of the game ==
- Betting in poker
- Public cardroom rules
- Cheating in poker

=== Poker hands ===
List of poker hands

- Rank of hands
- Standard poker hands
  - Straight flush
  - Four of a kind
  - Full house
  - Flush
  - Straight
  - Three of a kind
  - Two pair
  - One pair
  - High card
- Non-standard poker hands

=== Poker variations ===
List of poker variants

- Draw poker (including five-card draw)
- Stud poker (including five-card stud and seven-card stud)
- Community card poker (including Texas hold 'em and Omaha hold 'em)
- Casino games with poker-like rules (including Caribbean stud and Pai Gow poker)
- Three card poker (including three card brag)
- Four card poker
- Chinese poker
- Non-standard poker hands

== Game play ==
- Poker tools

=== Poker strategy ===
Poker strategy

- Fundamental theorem of poker
- Morton's theorem
- Pot odds
- Other terminology

==== Poker plays ====
- Aggressive plays –
- Bluff –
- Check-raise –
- Draw –
- Isolation –
- Position plays –
- Protection plays –
- Slow plays –
- Steal –

==== Poker probability ====
Poker probability

- Poker probability (Texas hold 'em)
- Poker probability (Omaha)
- Poker probability (Seven-Card Stud)

==== Poker psychology ====
Poker psychology

- Tells

== Poker venues ==
- Online poker –
- Casino –
- Card room –

=== Organized poker ===
- Tournaments
  - World Series of Poker
  - World Poker Tour
  - Other notable tournaments

== History of poker ==
History of poker

- Poker boom

== General poker concepts ==
- Glossary of poker terms
- List of playing-card nicknames
- Casino token
- Poker jargon

== Poker personalities ==
- Notable poker players

== Related games ==
- Poker-related games include:
  - Non-poker vying games commonly played along with poker such as:
    - Seven twenty-seven
    - Bourré
  - Unrelated games that use poker hands in various ways, such as:
    - Liar's poker

== See also ==
- Category:Poker companies
- Category:Television shows about poker
- Dogs Playing Poker
