= Post-oak bluff =

Type of poker bet

In no-limit or pot-limit poker, a post-oak bluff is a very small bet relative to the size of the already-existing pot. This type of bluff may be employed as an attempt at using reverse psychology to steal the pot. It holds comparatively little risk for the player making the bet. The term was popularized by Doyle Brunson in his 1979 book Super System.

== Strategy ==
A player executing the post-oak bluff bets a small amount relative to the size of the pot (typically of the order of 1/10 the pot), in order to create the impression that they are trying to lure the other player into the pot. In this way, they mimic the play might be made if they had a strong hand, where it is known as a "here kitty kitty" or "come hither" bet. When successful, the other players fold rather than fall into the perceived trap. This bluff will not often win the pot as the pot odds presented by the bet—11 to 1—are usually too good for the opposing players to reject unless they are absolutely convinced they are beaten. However, in order to be successful in the long term, a 1/10 pot-size bluff need only succeed one time in ten.

Dan Harrington has enumerated three preconditions he says are requisite for him to ever use a post-oak bluff:

- He must have seen his opponent employ the luring bet.
- His opponent must have previously observed him making luring bets.
- He must have witnessed his opponent fold to a small bet.

The term itself—derived from the post oak, a smallish tree of little commercial value—often carries derogatory connotations and it is frequently seen as a weak play, as the player takes the overcautious approach by not betting too much. Thus, this strategy often undermines the chances of the bluff working. Doyle Brunson described the move as "gutless" and he claims that he never makes the play.

== See also ==
- List of poker terms
- Poker strategy
