= Vigorish =

Fee charged by a bookmaker for accepting a gambler's wager

Vigorish (also called the cut, the house edge, juice, the margin, the take, under-juice, or the vig) is the fee charged by a bookmaker for accepting a gambler's wager. In American English, it can also refer to the interest owed to a loanshark in consideration for credit. The term came to English usage via Yiddish slang (Yiddish: וויגריש, romanized: vigrish) which was itself a loanword from Russian (Russian: вы́игрыш, romanized: výigryš, lit. 'gain, winnings').

As a business practice, charging the vig is an example of risk management; it guarantees the bookmaker a profit regardless of the underlying event's outcome. As a rule, bookmakers do not want to have a financial interest creating a preference for one result over another in any given sporting event. This is accomplished by incentivizing their clientele to wager offsetting amounts on all potential outcomes of the event. The normal method by which this is achieved is by adjusting the payouts for each outcome (collectively called the line) as imbalances of total amounts wagered between them occur.

Within the mathematical disciplines of probability and statistics this is analogous to an overround, though the two are not synonymous but are related by the connecting formulae below. Over round occurs when the sum of the implied probabilities for all possible event results is above 100%, whereas the vigorish is the bookmaker's percentage profit on the total stakes made on the event. For example, an overround of 20% results in 16.6̅6̅% (Note: Much of the computation inherent to bookmaking is fractional, but frequently in print the decimal representations are used instead. This makes them easier to input into calculators and more agreeably format within any surrounding text. It is to be understood though that these fractions frequently result in a decimal repetend or infinitely repeating set of numbers somewhere to the right of the decimal point. For the sake of balancing clarity and accuracy, wherever possible this article will use a vinculum when there is a repetend, displaying the digits which infinitely repeat with an overline above them.) vigorish. The connecting formulae are
$$v = \frac{o}{1 + o} \quad \text{and} \quad o = \frac{v}{1 - v},$$
where v represents vigorish, and o represents over round.

== Proportionality ==
It is simplest to assume that vigorish is factored in proportionally to the true odds, although this need not be the case. Under proportional vigorish, a "fair odds" betting line of 2.00/2.00 (Note: Betting lines offered as examples below represent the ratio of total payout (stake + winnings) to the original amount risked. In the case of a $1 wager, a fixed-odds betting line of 1.83̅/2.20 would result in actual winnings of $0.83 and $1.20 for the backers of the respective outcomes, once the original $1 spent to place the wager is subtracted. The amounts and currency used are irrelevant; the calculation is always: a wager of size n offers a total payout of n × the betting line.) without vigorish would decrease the payouts of all outcomes equally, perhaps to 1.95/1.95, once it was added. More commonly though, disproportional vigorish will be applied as part of the efforts to keep the amounts wagered balanced, such as 1.9̅0̅/2.00, making the outcome with fewer dollars wagered appear more attractive due to the larger payout.

== Example ==
In the context of betting, two individuals may choose to place a wager on opposite outcomes of an event, agreeing on "fair odds" or evens. This arrangement involves each party risking an equal amount, such as $100, with the potential to win the same amount. The arrangement is made directly between the individuals, bypassing a bookmaker. Consequently, the winner is entitled to the total amount staked by both parties, while the loser forfeits their stake. This direct betting approach implies that both parties accept the counterparty risk, acknowledging the possibility that the losing party may not honor the payment upon the event's conclusion, a risk typically mitigated by a bookmaker through the payment of vigorish.

When using a sportsbook with the odds set at 1.9̅0̅/2.00 (10 to 11) with vigorish factored in, each person would have to risk or lay $110 to win $100 (the sportsbook collects $220 "in the pot"). The extra $10 per person is, in effect, a bookmaker's commission for taking the action. This $10 is not in play and cannot be doubled by the winning bettor; it can only be lost. A losing bettor simply loses his $110. A winning bettor wins back his original $110, plus his $100 winnings, for a total of $210. From the $220 collected, the sportsbook keeps the remaining $10 after paying out the winner.

== Theory versus practice ==
Vigorish can be defined independent of the outcome of the event and of bettors' behaviors, by defining it as the percentage of total dollars wagered retained by the bookmaker in a risk-free wager. This definition is largely theoretical in practice as it makes the assumption that the bookmaker has balanced the wagers perfectly, such that they make equal profit regardless of the contest result.

For a two-outcome event, the vigorish percentage, v is
$$v = 100\left(1 - \frac{pq}{p + q}\right),$$
where the p and q are the decimal payouts for each outcome. This should not be confused with the percentage a bettor pays due to vigorish. No consistent definition of the percentage a bettor pays due to vigorish can be made without first defining the bettor's behavior under juiced odds and assuming a win-percentage for the bettor. These factors are discussed under the debate section.

For example, 1.9̅0̅/2.00 pricing of an even match is 4.55% vigorish, and 1.95/1.95 pricing is 2.38% vigorish.

Vigorish percentage for three-way events may be calculated using the following formula:
$$v = 100 \cdot \frac{1/p + 1/q + 1/t - 1}{1/p + 1/q + 1/t},$$
where p, q and t are the decimal payouts for each outcome. For comparison, for over round calculation only the upper part of the equation is used, leading to slightly higher percentage results than the vigorish calculation.

== Other kinds of vigorish ==
=== Casino games ===
More generically, vigorish can refer to the bookmaker/casino's theoretical advantage from all possible wagers on any game they offer. The term may also refer, and be applied in specific ways, to particular casino games.

- Baccarat, in the house-banked version of baccarat (also mini-baccarat) commonly played in North American casinos, vigorish refers to the 5% commission (called the cagnotte) charged to players who win a bet on the banker hand. The rules of the game are structured so that the banker hand wins slightly more often than the player hand; the 5% vigorish restores the house advantage to the casino for both bets. In most casinos, a winning banker bet is paid at even money, with a running count of the commission owed kept by special markers in a commission box in front of the dealer. This commission must be paid when all the cards are dealt from the shoe or when the player leaves the game. Some casinos do not keep a running commission amount, and instead withdraw the commission directly from the winnings; a few require the commission to be posted along with the bet, in a separate space on the table.
- Backgammon, the recube vig is the value of having possession of the doubling cube to the player being offered a double.
- Craps, vigorish refers to the 5% commission charged on a buy bet, where a player wishes to bet that one of the numbers—4, 5, 6, 8, 9 or 10—will be rolled before a 7 is rolled. The commission is charged at the rate of $1 for every $20 bet. The bet is paid off at the true mathematical odds, but the 5% commission is paid as well, restoring the house advantage. For many years, this commission was paid whether the bet won or not. In recent years, many casinos have changed to charging the commission only when the bet wins, which greatly reduces the house advantage; for instance, the house advantage on a buy bet on the 4 or 10 is reduced from 5% to 1.67%, since the bet wins one-third of the time (2:1 odds against). In this case, the vig may be deducted from the winnings (for instance, a $20 bet on the 4 would be paid $39, that is, $40 at 2:1 odds minus the $1 commission), or the player may simply hand the commission in and receive the full payout. This rule is commonplace in Mississippi casinos, and becoming more widely available in Nevada.
- Roulette: odds are calculated out of 36 numbers, but the wheel has one or two extra pockets (zero and double zero).
- Slot machines – the payouts and winning combinations available on most slot machines and other electronic gambling systems are often designed such that an average of between 0.1% to 10% (varying by machine and facility) of funds taken in are not used to pay out winnings, and thus becomes the house's share. Machines or facilities with a particularly low percentage are often said to be loose.
- Poker
  - In pai gow poker, a 5% commission charged on all winning bets is referred to as vigorish. Unlike baccarat, the commission is paid after each winning bet, either by the player handing in the amount from his stack of chips, or by having the vig deducted from the winnings.
  - In table poker, the vigorish, more commonly called the rake, is a fraction of each bet placed into the pot. The dealer removes the rake from the pot after each bet (or betting round), making change if necessary. The winner of the hand gets the money that remains in the pot after the rake has been removed. Most casinos take 5–10% of the pot, typically capping the total rake at $3 or $4.

=== Other uses ===
- In investment banking, "vig" is sometimes used to describe profits from advisory and other activities.
- In sports, Pittsburgh Pirates announcer Bob Prince coined the term "hidden vigorish" to describe an underdog's ability to beat the odds in a given situation.
- The term is also used in reference to an auction house's buyers and sellers fees.

== See also ==
- Loan shark
- Rake (poker)
- Market maker
- Bid–ask spread
- Spread betting including point spread
