= High card by suit =

Assigning relative values to playing cards of equal rank based on their suit

High card by suit and low card by suit refer to assigning relative values to playing cards of equal rank based on their suit. When suit ranking is applied, the most common conventions from lowest to highest are:

♣♦♥♠ English alphabetical order
clubs, followed by diamonds, hearts, and spades.
This ranking is used in the game of bridge.
This ranking is adopted in Unicode's Miscellaneous Symbols block (U+2660/4 for ♠, U+2661/5 for ♥, U+2662/6 for ♦, and U+2663/7 for ♣) and Playing Cards block (U+1F0A1–1F0AE for ♠, U+1F0B1–1F0BE for ♥, U+1F0C1–1F0CE for ♦, and U+1F0D1–1F0DE for ♣); see Playing cards in Unicode.
♠♥♦♣ American Cards
Most Poker games avoid split pots by using the following order: spades, hearts, diamonds, and clubs.
♦♣♥♠ Alternating colors
Diamonds, followed by clubs, hearts, and spades. Similar to alphabetical ranking in that the two highest rankings are occupied by the same two suits (hearts and spades) in the same relative position to one another, but differing in the two lowest rankings, which while occupied by the same two suits (clubs and diamonds) have their relative position to one another swapped.
This ranking is sometimes used in the Chinese card game Big Two.
♠♣♦♥ High reds
Some Russian card games like Preference, 1000 etc. use the following order: spades, clubs, diamonds and hearts.
500 and the game Hearts also uses this ordering.
♦♥♠♣ Low reds
Some German card games like Skat use the following order: diamonds, hearts, spades and clubs.
♣♥♦♠ Chinese-Japanese-Korean conventional order
clubs, followed by hearts, diamonds, and spades.
This ranking is commonly used in China, Japan, and South Korea, in their variants of Poker games.
♥♦♣♠ Italian conventional order
Hearts (Cuori), Diamonds (Quadri), Clubs (Fiori), Spades (Picche), remembered with the mnemonic “Come Quando Fuori Piove”.
This ranking is commonly used in Italy in their variants of poker games.

== Poker ==
Most poker games do not rank suits; the ace of clubs is just as good as the ace of spades. However, small issues (such as deciding who deals first) are sometimes resolved by dealing one card to each player. If two players draw cards of the same rank, one way to break the tie is to use an arbitrary hierarchy of suits. The order of suit rank differs by location; for example, the ranking most commonly used in the United States is not the one typically used in Italy.

Cards are always compared by rank first, and only then by suit. For example, using the "alphabetical order" of suits, the ace of clubs ranks higher than any king, but lower than the ace of diamonds. High card by suit is used to break ties between poker hands as a regional variance, but more commonly is used in the following situations, as well as various others, based upon the circumstances of the particular game:

- Randomly selecting a player or players.

To randomly select a player to deal, to choose the game, to move to another table, or for other reasons, deal each player one card and the player with high card by suit is selected. Multiple players can be selected this way.

- Assigning the bring-in.

In games such as Seven-card stud, where the player with the lowest-ranking face-up card is required to open the first betting round for a minimal amount, ties can be broken by suit. In such low stud games as razz, the player with the highest-ranking upcard must post the bring-in.

- Awarding odd chips in a split pot.

In High-low split games, or when two players' hands tie, the pot must be split evenly between them. When there is an odd amount of money in the pot that can't be split evenly, the odd low-denomination chip can be given to the player whose hand contains the high card by suit. (This solution is not necessary in games with blinds, in which case the odd chip between high and low is awarded to the high hand, and the odd chip between a split high or split low is awarded to the first player following the dealer button.)

- Breaking ties in a chip race

During poker tournaments, a chip race is used to "color up" large numbers of smaller-denomination chips, and a modified deal is used to assign leftover chips. Ties in the deal are broken by suit.

== Contract bridge ==
In bridge, suit rank during the bidding phase of the game is by ascending alphabetical order.

During the play of the cards, the trump suit is superior to all other suits and the other suits are of equal rank to each other. If there is no trump suit, all suits are of equal rank.
