= Table stakes =

Gambling term

In poker and other gambling games, table stakes is a rule that a player may bet no more money than they had on the table at the beginning of that hand; they cannot go back to their pocket for more money once a hand is dealt. This limits the amount that a player can lose, while also limiting the amount other players may have to bet. In between hands, a player is free to re-buy or add on so long as their entire stack after the re-buy or add-on does not exceed the maximum buy-in. This rule generally applies to cash or ring games of poker rather than tournament games and is intended to level the stakes by creating a maximum and minimum buy-in as well as rules for adding and removing chips from play when playing with cash. A player also may not take a portion of their money off the table, unless they leave the game and take their entire stack out of play. Table stakes is the rule in most cash poker games because it allows players with vastly different bankrolls a reasonable amount of protection when playing with one another. Contrary to classic Hollywood poker movie scenes, money taken from the wallet during a hand (called "open stakes") cannot be used under table stakes. Under the table stakes rule, a player must post at least the game's minimum buy-in to be dealt into a hand.

== Other uses ==
In business, "table stakes" are the minimum entry requirement for a market or business arrangement. They can be price, cost model, technology, or other capability that represents a minimum requirement to have a credible competitive starting position in a market or other business arrangement. For example, to be a wireless service provider, the table stakes are the basic features you need to have in order to be in that business to achieve foundation capability—network, handsets, a data service, a mail server, etc. Beyond that, real competitive advantage comes from additional nimbleness and cost or product differentiation.

== See also ==
- Betting in poker
- Glossary of poker terms
