= Ring game =

Ring game may refer to:

- Ring game (pool), a general class of multi-player pocket billiards gambling games
- Ring game, or cash game, a poker game played with "real" chips and each player's own money at stake
