= Five-card draw =

Set of poker rules

Five-card draw is a poker variant that is considered the simplest variant of poker, and is the basis for video poker. As a result, it is often the first variant learned by new players. It is commonly played in home games but rarely played in casino and tournament play. The variant is also offered by some online venues, although it is not as popular as other variants such as seven-card stud and Texas hold 'em.

== Gameplay ==
In casino play the first betting round begins with the player to the left of the big blind, and subsequent rounds begin with the player to the dealer's left. Home games typically use an ante; the first betting round begins with the player to the dealer's left, and the second round begins with the player who opened the first round.

Play begins with each player being dealt five cards, one at a time, all face down from a standard 52-card deck. The remaining deck is placed aside, often protected by placing a chip or other marker on it. Players pick up the cards and hold them in their hands, being careful to keep them concealed from the other players, then a round of betting occurs.

If more than one player remains after the first betting round, a draw phase follows, during which players may discard any number of cards and receive replacements from the deck.

A second "after the draw" betting round occurs beginning with the player to the dealer's left or else beginning with the player who opened the first round (the latter is common when antes are used instead of blinds). This is followed by a showdown if more than one player remains, and the player with the best hand wins the pot.

== House rules ==
A common "house rule" in some places is that a player may not replace more than three cards, unless they draw four cards while keeping an ace (or wild card). This rule is useful for low-stakes social games where many players will stay for the draw, and will help avoid depletion of the deck. In more serious games such as those played in casinos it is unnecessary and generally not used. However, a rule used by many casinos is that a player is not allowed to draw five consecutive cards from the deck. In this case, if a player wishes to replace all five of their cards, that player is given four of them in turn, the other players are given their draws, and then the dealer returns to that player to give the fifth replacement card; if no other player draws it is necessary to deal a burn card first.

Another common house rule is that the bottom card of the deck is never given as a replacement, to avoid the possibility of someone who might have seen it during the deal using that information. If the deck is depleted during the draw before all players have received their replacements, the last players can receive cards chosen randomly from among those discarded by previous players. For example, if the last player to draw wants three replacements but there are only two cards remaining in the deck, the dealer gives the player the one top card he can give, then shuffles together the bottom card of the deck, the burn card, and the earlier players' discards (but not the player's own discards), and finally deals two more replacements to the last player.

== Sample deal ==
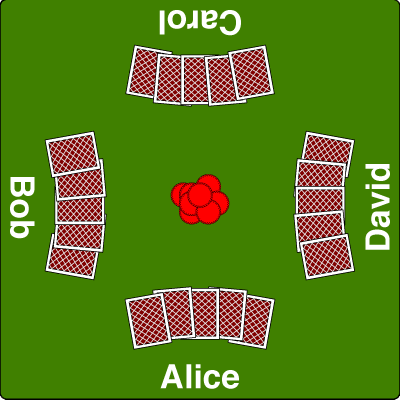

The sample deal is being played by four players as shown to the right with Alice dealing. All four players ante $1. Alice deals five cards to each player and places the deck aside.

Bob opens the betting round by betting $5. Carol folds, David calls, and Alice calls, closing the betting round.

Bob now declares that he wishes to replace three of his cards, so he removes those three cards from his hand and discards them. Alice retrieves the deck, deals a burn card, then deals three cards directly to Bob, who puts them in his hand. David discards one card, and Alice deals one card to him from the deck. Alice now discards three of her own cards, and replaces them with three from the top of the deck.

Now a second betting round begins. Bob checks, David checks, Alice bets $10, Bob folds, David raises $16, and Alice calls, ending the second betting round and going directly into a showdown. David shows a flush, and Alice shows two pair, so David takes the pot.

== Stripped deck variant ==
Five-card draw is sometimes played with a stripped deck. This variant is commonly known as "seven-to-ace" or "ace-to-seven" (abbreviated as A-7 or 7-A). It can be played by up to five players. When four or fewer players play, a normal 32-card deck without jokers, with ranks ranging from ace to seven, is used. With five players, the sixes are added to make a 36-card deck. The deck thus contains only eight or nine different card ranks, compared to 13 in a standard deck. This affects the probabilities of making specific hands, so a flush ranks above a full house and below four of a kind. Many smaller online poker rooms, such as Boss Media, spread the variant, although it is unheard of in brick-and-mortar casinos.

== Maths of five-card draw ==
Pre-draw odds of getting each hand

- Royal flush <0.001%
- Straight flush (not including royal flush) <0.002%
- Four of a kind 0.02%
- Full house 0.14%
- Flush (excluding royal flush and straight flush) 0.20%
- Straight (excluding royal flush and straight flush) 0.39%
- Three of a kind 2.11%
- Two pair 4.75%
- One pair 42.30%
- No pair / High card / Nothing 50.10%

== See also ==
- Draw poker
- Poker strategy
