= Texas hold 'em starting hands =

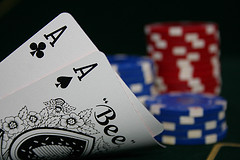
A pair of aces is the best pre-flop hand in Texas Hold 'em Poker

In Texas hold 'em, a starting hand consists of two hole cards, which belong solely to the player and remain hidden from the other players. Five community cards are also dealt into play. Betting begins before any of the community cards are exposed, and continues throughout the hand. The player's "playing hand," which will be compared against that of each competing player, is the best 5-card poker hand available from his two-hole cards and the five community cards. Unless otherwise specified, here the term hand applies to the player's two hole cards, or starting hand.

== Essentials ==
There are 1,326 possible combinations of two hole cards from a standard 52-card deck in hold 'em, but since suits have no absolute value in this poker variant, many of these hands are identical in value before the flop. For example, A♥ J♥ and A♠ J♠ are identical in value, because each is a hand consisting of an ace and a jack of the same suit.

Therefore, there are 169 non-equivalent starting hands in hold 'em, which is the total count of 13 pocket pairs, 13 × 12 x 1 / 2 = 78 suited hands and likewise 78 unsuited hands (13 + 78 + 78 = 169).

These 169 hands are not equally likely. Hold 'em hands are sometimes classified as having one of three "shapes":

- Pairs, (or "pocket pairs"), which consist of two cards of the same rank (e.g., 9♠ 9♣). One hand in 17 will be a pair, P(pair) = 1/17.

Alternative means of making this calculation

First Step
As confirmed above.

There are 1326 possible combinations of opening hand.

Second Step

There are six different combinations of each pair. 9h9c, 9h9s, 9h9d, 9c9s, 9c9d, 9d9s. Therefore, there are 78 possible combinations of pocket pairs (6 multiplied by 13 i.e. 22-AA)

To calculate the odds of being dealt a pair

78 (the number of any particular pair being dealt. As above) divided by 1326 (possible opening hands)

78/1326 ≈ 0.0588 or 5.88%

- Suited hands, which contain two cards of the same suit (e.g. A♣ 6♣).

Probability of first card is 1.0 (any of the 52 cards)
Probability of second hand suit matching the first:
There are 13 cards per suit, and one is in your hand leaving 12 remaining of the 51 cards remaining in the deck. 12/51 ≈ 0.2353 or 23.53%

- Offsuit hands, which contain two cards of a different suit and rank (e.g. K♠ J♥). 70.59% of all hands are offsuit non-paired hands

Offsuit pairs = 78

Other offsuit hands = 936

It is typical to abbreviate suited hands in hold 'em by affixing an "s" to the hand, as well as to abbreviate non-suited hands with an "o" (for offsuit). That is,

QQ represents any pair of queens,
KQ represents any king and queen,
AKo represents any ace and king of different suits, and
JTs represents any jack and ten of the same suit.

== Limit hand rankings ==
Some notable theorists and players have created systems to rank the value of starting hands in limit Texas hold 'em. These rankings do not apply to no-limit play.

=== Sklansky hand groups ===
David Sklansky and Mason Malmuth assigned each hand to a group and proposed all hands in the group could normally be played similarly. Stronger starting hands are identified by a lower number. Hands without a number are the weakest starting hands. As a general rule, books on Texas hold 'em present hand strengths starting with the assumption of a nine- or ten-person table.

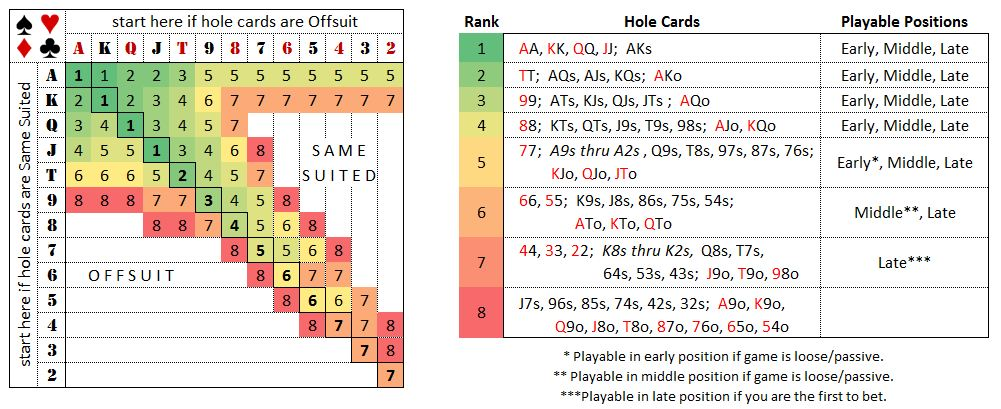
Sklansky Starting Hands Groups & Strategies

=== Chen formula ===
The "Chen Formula" is a way to compute the "power ratings" of starting hands that was originally developed by Bill Chen.

Highest Card
Based on the highest card, assign points as follows:
Ace = 10 points, K = 8 points, Q = 7 points, J = 6 points.
10 through 2, half of face value (10 = 5 points, 9 = 4.5 points, etc.)

Pairs
For pairs, multiply the points by 2 (AA=20, KK=16, etc.), with a minimum of 5 points for any pair. 55 is given an extra point (i.e., 6).

Suited
Add 2 points for suited cards.

Closeness
Subtract 1 point for 1 gappers (AQ, J9)
2 points for 2 gappers (J8, AJ).
4 points for 3 gappers (J7, 73).
5 points for larger gappers, including A2 A3 A4

Add an extra point if connected or 1-gap and your highest card is lower than Q (since you then can make all higher straights)

=== Phil Hellmuth's: Play Poker Like the Pros ===
Phil Hellmuth's Play Poker Like the Pros book published in 2003.

Tier	Hands	Category
1	AA, KK, AKs, QQ, AK	Top 12 Hands
2	JJ, TT, 99	Top 12 Hands
3	88, 77, AQs, AQ	Top 12 Hands
4	66, 55, 44, 33, 22, AJs, ATs, A9s, A8s	Majority Play Hands
5	A7s, A6s, A5s, A4s, A3s, A2s, KQs, KQ	Majority Play Hands
6	QJs, JTs, T9s, 98s, 87s, 76s, 65s	Suited Connectors

=== Statistics based on real online play ===
Statistics based on real play with their associated actual value in real bets.

Tier	Hands	Expected Value
1	AA, KK, QQ, JJ, AKs	2.32 - 0.78
2	AQs, TT, AK, AJs, KQs, 99	0.59 - 0.38
3	ATs, AQ, KJs, 88, KTs, QJs	0.32 - 0.20
4	A9s, AJ, QTs, KQ, 77, JTs	0.19 - 0.15
5	A8s, K9s, AT, A5s, A7s	0.10 - 0.08
6	KJ, 66, T9s, A4s, Q9s	0.08 - 0.05
7	J9s, QJ, A6s, 55, A3s, K8s, KT	0.04 - 0.01
8	98s, T8s, K7s, A2s	0.00
9	87s, QT, Q8s, 44, A9, J8s, 76s, JT	(-) 0.02 - 0.03

== Nicknames for starting hands ==
In poker communities, it is common for hole cards to be given nicknames. While most combinations have a nickname, stronger handed nicknames are generally more recognized, the most notable probably being the "Big Slick" - ace and king of the same suit, although an ace-king of any suit combination is less occasionally referred to as an Anna Kournikova, derived from the initials AK and because it "looks really good but rarely wins." Hands can be named according to their shapes (e.g., paired aces look like "rockets", paired jacks look like "fish hooks") or a historic event (e.g., A's and 8's - dead man's hand, representing the hand held by Wild Bill Hickok when he was fatally shot in the back by Jack McCall in 1876). Many other themes like animal names, alliteration and rhyming are also used in nicknames.
