= Four flush =

Poker draw one card short of a full flush

A four flush (also flush draw) is a poker draw or non-standard poker hand that is one card short of being a full flush. Four flushing refers to empty boasting or unsuccessful bluffing, and a four flusher is a person who makes empty boasts or bluffs when holding a four flush. Four flusher can also refer to a welcher, piker, or braggart. This pejorative term originated in the 19th century when bluffing poker players misrepresented that they had a flush—a poker hand with five cards all of one suit—when they only had four cards of one suit. Optimal strategies for bluffing or folding when holding a four flush have been explored extensively in poker strategy books.

== In media ==
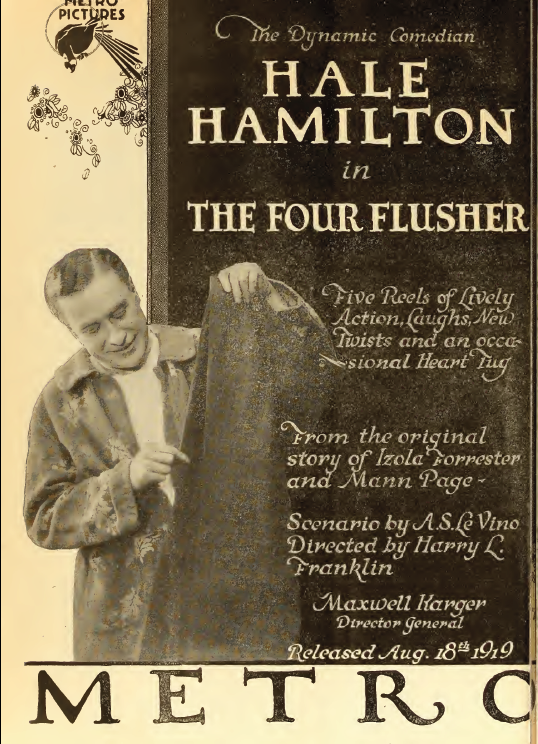
1919 film The Four Flusher

The first governor of Oklahoma, Charles N. Haskell, denounced president and political opponent Theodore Roosevelt, calling him a "four flusher".

Metro Pictures released the comedy The Four Flusher in 1919. Several other films have the term in their titles.

In the 1922 Harold Lloyd silent film Dr. Jack, the phrase "a four flusher" is used to describe the doctor in charge of "The Sick-Little-Well-Girl" in the city.

The Four Flusher is the name of an American comedy written in 1925.

In the 1926 silent film The Show-Off, Clara (Louise Brooks) calls Aubrey Piper (Ford Sterling) a four flusher, meaning a braggart or a person who makes false or pretentious claims. In the film, his "four flushing" has resulted in the loss of money needed to pay for the mortgage on the Fisher family home.

In the 1933 Marx Brothers movie Duck Soup, Rufus T. Firefly (Groucho Marx) calls Ambassador Trentino a "four-flushing swine".

In the 1941 movie Hellzapoppin', Pepi (Mischa Auer) is called a four flusher.

In the 1945 film Detour, Tom Neal's character calls another character, Charlie Haskell Jr. (echoing the name of the Oklahoma governor), a four flusher.

In the 1948 film Homecoming, Clark Gable's character is called a four flusher.

After dismissing Douglas MacArthur as Supreme Commander of Allied Powers in 1951, President Harry Truman told Merle Miller that General George Marshall had called MacArthur a "four flusher and no two ways about it".

A 1954 Popeye cartoon is titled "Floor Flusher", a pun on "four flusher".

In the 1967 Disney film The Jungle Book, Bagheera calls Baloo a "four flusher" when he sees that Baloo is still alive after believing that he was dead.

The Doobie Brothers' song "Double Dealin' Four Flusher" is on their 1975 album Stampede.

The phrase was used frequently by screenwriter John Hughes as something of a trademark. In National Lampoon's Christmas Vacation, Clark refers to his boss as "four flushing" in his tirade over his corporate Christmas present. In Home Alone 2: Lost in New York, it is used by the mafia boss Johnny in the fictional film Angels with Even Filthier Souls. In Uncle Buck, a quite drunk Pooter the Clown calls Buck a four flusher when ordered to leave the family home, which results in Buck punching the clown in the face.

In 2014, a screenplay calledFourFlush was written by Harley Evseichik.

== See also ==
- Flush draw
- Glossary of poker terms
