= Rake (poker) =

Commission fee taken by a cardroom operating a poker game

Rake is the scaled commission fee taken by a cardroom operating a poker game. It is generally 2.5% to 10% of the pot in each poker hand, up to a predetermined maximum amount. There are also other non-percentage ways for a casino to take the rake.

Poker is a player-versus-player game, and the house does not wager against its players (unlike blackjack or roulette), so this fee is the principal mechanism to generate revenue.

It is primarily levied by an establishment that supplies the necessary services for the game to take place. In online poker, it covers the various costs of operation such as support, software, and personnel. In traditional brick and mortar casinos, it is also used to cover the costs involved with providing a dealer (though in many places tips provide the bulk of a dealer's income) for the game, support staff (from servers to supervisors), use of gaming equipment, and the physical building in which the game takes place. The rake in live games is generally higher than for online poker.

Some cardrooms will not take a percentage rake in any community card poker game like Texas hold 'em when a hand does not have a flop. This is called "no flop, no drop".

To win when playing in poker games where the house takes a cut, a player must not only beat opponents, but also the financial drain of the rake.

== Mechanism ==
There are several ways for the rake to be taken. Most rake is a fixed percentage of the pot, taken on a sliding scale, with a capped maximum amount that can be removed from the pot regardless of pot size. Less frequently, the rake is a fixed amount no matter what the size of the pot.

=== Pot rake ===
A percentage rake is taken directly from the pot. In a live casino, the dealer manually removes chips from the pot while the hand is being played and sets them aside to be dropped into a secure box after completion of the hand. When playing online, the rake is taken automatically by the game software. Some software shows the rake amount next to a graphical representation of the dealer and takes it incrementally between the rounds of betting, whereas other software programs wait until the entire hand is over and then take it from the pot total before giving the rest to the winner of the hand. This is the prevalent method of collecting rake in online poker.

=== Dead drop ===
The fee is placed on the dealer button each hand by the player in that position and taken in by the dealer before any cards are dealt.

=== Time collection ===
Time collection (also "timed rake" or "table charge") is a set fee collected (typically) every half-hour during the game. This form of rake is collected in one of two ways:

- Player time: A set amount is collected from each player.
- Time pot: A set amount is collected from the first pot over a certain amount.

Time rakes are generally reserved for higher limit games ($10–$20 and above).

=== Fixed fees ===
The fee per hand is a fixed rate and does not vary based on the size of the pot.

=== Tournament fees ===
The above examples are used in ring games, also known as cash games. The rake for participation in poker tournaments is collected as an entrance fee. This may be displayed by showing the tournament buy-in as $100+$20, with the $20 being the house fee or "Vig". Other times they will show their buy-in as $100 and list the percentage they take for expenses.

=== Subscription fees ===
Some online cardrooms charge a monthly subscription fee and then do not rake individual pots or tournaments.

=== Rake free ===
Some online poker websites have done away with the rake altogether. These "rake free" poker rooms generate revenue by increasing traffic to the company's other profitable businesses (such as a casino or sportsbook) or by charging monthly membership or deposit fees. Some sites are only completely rake-free for frequent players, while offering reduced rake instead for other customers. Due to high fixed costs of operating a poker room, such as marketing, few online poker rooms have been successful in offering rake-free game, often going bankrupt or sustaining themselves by exploiting loopholes in offshore jurisdictions to refuse to honor players' cash withdrawals. However, some financially sound poker rooms have on occasion offered rake-free games to entice new sign-ups or to encourage players to try out new game formats.

== Rakeback ==
Rakeback is a player rewards method whereby some online poker sites or their affiliate partners return part of the rake or tournament entries a player pays as an incentive for them to continue playing on that site.

Rakeback in cash games can be calculated using two different methods: dealt and contributed. The dealt method awards the same amount of rakeback to each player dealt into a hand, and the contributed method rewards players based on their actual contribution to the pot. In poker tournaments, rakeback is deducted from the cardroom's entry fee. Rakeback is similar to comps in "brick and mortar" casinos.

As online poker becomes more mainstream online poker professionals have begun using rakeback as a means of increasing profits or cutting their losses. Depending upon the stakes the player is playing, how many tables they are playing at once, and the number of hours played daily, online poker pros can earn thousands of dollars in rakeback every month. This gave rise to so-called rakeback pros, players using a less intensive losing strategy at many tables simultaneously while offsetting their losses through rakeback.

Not every online poker room offers rakeback. Some allow affiliates to offer rakeback as a direct percentage of rake and tournament entries paid back to the players. Other card rooms such as PokerStars, PartyPoker, Ongame Network and the iPoker Network forbid affiliates to give rakeback. Instead they offer in-house loyalty programs that gives cash and other rewards to players based upon how much they play. At such networks, rakeback deals are sometimes cut between an affiliate and a player without the poker operator's knowledge. Such deals, if discovered, tend to result in the expulsion of either offending party, and, sometimes, in penalties for the poker operator, if they are part of a bigger poker network.

In brick and mortar rooms, the floorperson may offer a rake reduction or rake-free play to players willing to start a table shorthanded.

== Legality ==
In most legal jurisdictions, taking a rake from a poker table is explicitly illegal if the party taking the rake does not have the proper gaming licences and permits. The laws of many jurisdictions do not prohibit the playing of poker for money at a private dwelling, provided that no one takes a rake.

== See also ==
- Poker jargon
- Vigorish
