= Suited connectors =

Suited connectors is a poker term referring to pocket cards that are suited and consecutive, for example Q♥ J♥. These hands are considered stronger than average because they have the highest potential to form straights and flushes when combined with the community cards.

In Texas hold'em, suited connectors play well against multiple players when they can see the flop for cheap. Experienced players will generally not raise with them, because raising usually causes a few players to fold, decreasing the pot odds in the event of a straight or flush draw on the flop. However, a hand like ace-king suited might do well to raise because the cards will also work well if they pair, which is the more likely possibility, so the pot odds are less important.

== Suited connectors in cash games ==
Suited connectors can be especially effective in deep stack poker. An experienced player might call a loose player when he raises and re-raises with suited connectors in an attempt to win a big pot. Large stacks increase the value of suited connectors because of larger implied odds. In tournament play, where the stacks are normally shallow, suited connectors are very marginal hands. The idea behind playing suited connectors is that they will mostly be folded on the flop, but when they hit a quality draw or a made hand, a player should be looking to win all or a large portion of the opponent's stack. In Harrington on Cash Games, a chapter is dedicated on explaining the poker paradox: "Big hands" such as AA and KK tend to win small pots, and "small hands" such as 4♠ 3♠ tend to win big pots, simply because the small hands create well-concealed monsters and will only continue when they hit.

== Suited gappers ==
Non-consecutive suited pocket cards which are nonetheless close enough to each other in value that they can form a straight on the flop are generally referred to as a "suited gapper." For example, A♠ 3♠ is a suited 1-gapper and 5♦ 9♦ is a suited 3-gapper. In general, suited gappers are not as strong as suited connectors because they have a lower likelihood of making a straight.

== Probability ==
Suited connectors and suited gappers have a higher chance of making a straight or straight draw on the flop than non-connected hands.

The table shows the probability of hitting each outcome.

Hand	Straight	Straight Draw	Average Straight Draw Outs
Ace King	0.33%	12.18%	1.03
King Queen	0.65%	16.92%	1.22
Queen Jack	0.98%	22.12%	1.33
Jack Ten	1.31%	27.84%	1.40
Ace Queen	0.33%	12.84%	1.08
King Jack	0.65%	17.06%	1.25
Queen Ten	0.98%	22.78%	1.35
Ace Jack	0.33%	13.31%	1.1
King Ten	0.65%	18.04%	1.26
Ace Ten	0.33%	14.29%	1.11
King Nine	0.33%	12.98%	1.13

There are two main factors that influence the chance of a straight:

- Higher card outs: A hand that is jack-high has a higher chance of making a straight than a hand that is ace-high. This is due to the jack-high being able to include cards higher than itself as outs.
- Low straights: A hand that includes an ace can make a high straight: 10-J-Q-K-A or a low straight: A-2-3-4-5. This causes an ace-ten hand to have a higher straight draw probability than a king-nine hand.
