= Isolation (poker) =

In poker, an isolation play is usually a raise designed to encourage one or more players to fold, specifically for the purpose of making the hand a one-on-one contest with a specific opponent. For example, if an opponent raises and a player suspects they are holding a weak, but playable hand, they may reraise to pressure other opponents to fold, with the aim of getting heads up with the opening raiser.

Isolation plays are most common against overly-aggressive players ("maniacs") who frequently play inferior hands, or with players who may have a drawing hand. Isolation plays are also common in tournaments to isolate a player who is "short stacked", that is, one who is in imminent danger of elimination, and so is likely to be playing aggressively out of desperation. However, when a player is extremely short stacked compared to the rest of the field in a tournament, making him bust will sometimes be more profitable than winning his chips, so inducing overcalls from other players trumps isolation play.

Isolating is encouraged when holding a hand that fares better heads up than in a multi-way pot. For instance, when a player has a small pocket pair they may raise a large amount simply to knock out other players because typically a small pocket pair is about 50–60% likely to win an all-in pot in a heads up situation, but less likely when facing multiple opponents.

== See also ==
- Protection (poker)
- Poker jargon
