= Counterfeit (poker) =

Status of a player or hand in poker

In community card poker, a player or hand is said to be counterfeited when a community card matches a player's hole card and does not change the value of their hand, but makes it more likely that an opponent will beat it. This occurs primarily in Omaha hold 'em Hi-Lo split and sometimes in Texas hold 'em. Counterfeiting also occurs in the Badugi variant of draw poker.

== Omaha Hi-Lo ==
The more common occurrence of counterfeiting in Omaha Hi-Lo is when a person's best possible low hand, called the "nut low", is counterfeited. As an example, say Alice has A♠ 3♣ J♦ Q♦ while Bob holds A♣ 2♦ 9♦ J♠ and Carol holds 9♥ T♥ K♥ A♥. If the flop comes 6♥ 7♥ 8♥, Carol has a lock on the high hand with her 10-high straight flush, but Alice and Bob are still competing for the low half of the pot. Bob holds an 8-7-6-2-A, ahead of Alice's 8-7-6-3-A. In fact, Bob currently holds the nut low hand; no one can have a better low hand.

However, if the turn card is 2♣, Alice and Bob's fortunes have changed. Alice now has the nut-low of 7-6-3-2-A, while Bob must still play the A-2 from his hand for a low of 8-7-6-2-A. The turn card did not make Bob's hand worse, but it did make Alice's hand better. Bob's only chance at the low pot now is if a 3 comes on the river, counterfeiting Alice's hand and giving both Alice and Bob a 7-6-3-2-A to split the low half of the pot. (If a 3 does come on the river, the nut low hand becomes A-4 to make 6-4-3-2-A.)

On the other hand, on a flop of 8-7-6, a hand containing A-2-3-4 is considered counterfeit-proof, because it currently is the nut low (8-7-6-2-A), and even if an A or a 2 arrives on the turn, it will remain the nut low (7-6-3-2-A) and will remain protected from counterfeiting on the river. A player with this type of protection can be bolder in betting.

== Texas hold 'em ==
Counterfeiting in Texas hold 'em is similar to counterfeiting in Omaha, in that hands do not change value. Often Texas hold 'em counterfeiting is less likely to cause a player to lose an entire pot. On a flop of Q-J-T, a player holding A-K will have flopped an ace-high Broadway straight. If the turn card comes a king, the player with A-K will still have the same straight, but now so will a player with A-7, resulting in a tie. The A-K player's hand did not get worse in rank, but it becomes less likely to win the entire pot.

Counterfeiting in Texas hold 'em more often leads to ties, as in the example above, but can also result in losses. For example, if the flop is J-T-9, K-Q is the best possible hand, but if the turn card is a queen, a player who held K-Q will now be counterfeited and able to lose to a player with A-K.

As another example, a player might hold 8♠ 7♠ on a J♠ 9♠ 5♠ flop and be very likely to have the strongest hand with a J♠ 9♠ 8♠ 7♠ 5♠ flush. If the turn card is 2♠, this player will still have a J♠ 9♠ 8♠ 7♠ 5♠ flush. But they are now able to lose the pot to any player holding any spade higher than the 9♠, because the turn card has counterfeited their 7♠ and given the other player a better flush. This other player could win, for example, with A♠ J♦, since all that is needed is one card, the A♠, to complete the nut flush.

In common usage, the term counterfeiting is sometimes applied in a non-standard way to situations where hands do change value. If the flop is J-7-5, a player who has 7-5 would have two pair and be ahead of a player with pocket aces. Another jack on the turn or river, however, will make the first player's hand objectively stronger—from Sevens and Fives to Jacks and Sevens—but now behind the second player's Aces and Jacks, with the original pair of 5s being counterfeited by the pair on the board.

On the same J-7-5 flop, a player holding 6-6 will be ahead of opponents holding A-K and Q-9, because that player has a pair of 6s, while the other two only have A high or Q high respectively. However, if the turn and river comes J-7, all three players now have two pair, Jacks and Sevens, and the player with A-K wins the pot because they have the best kicker.
