= Poker dealer =

Individual who distributes cards in poker

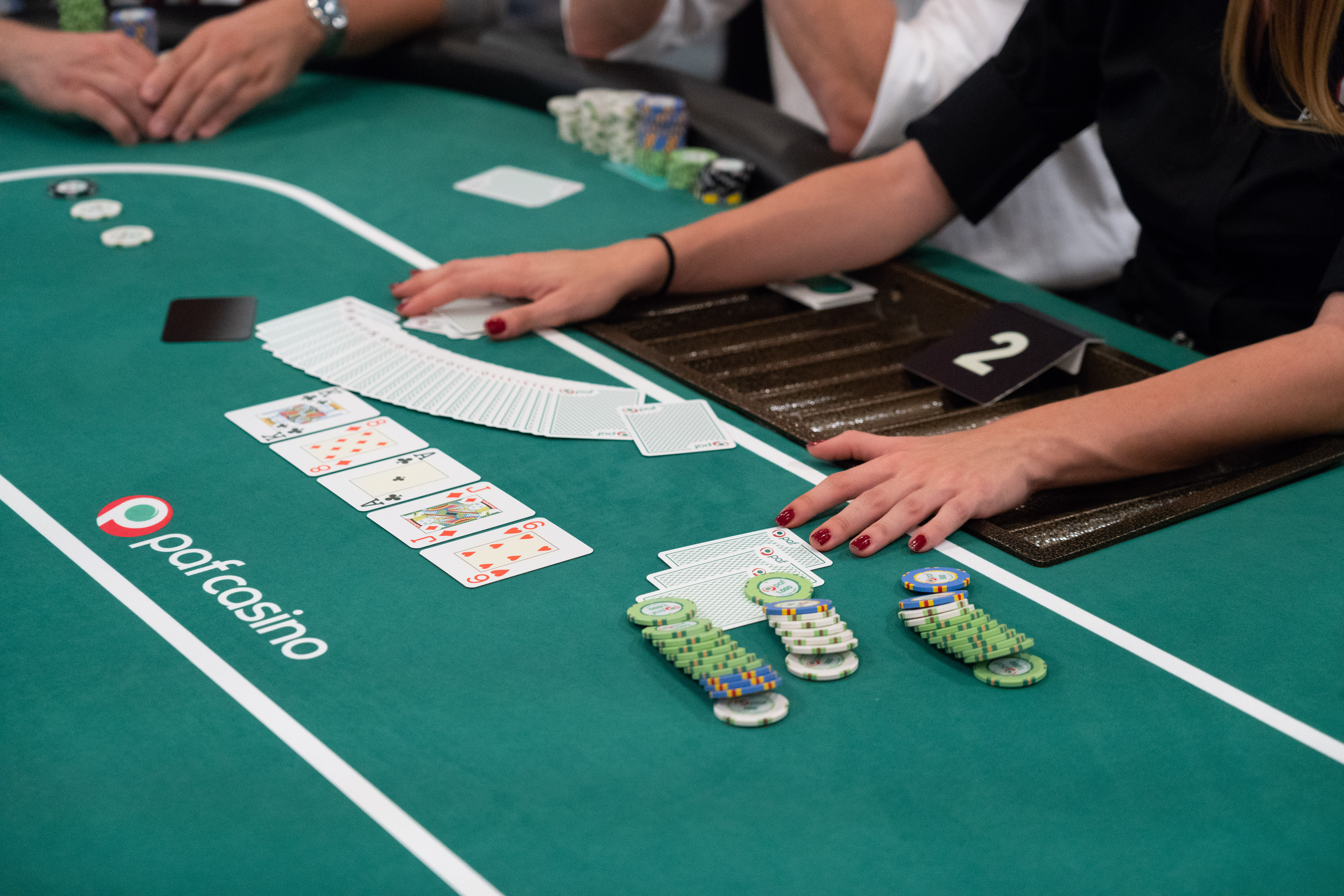
A poker dealer

A poker dealer distributes cards to players and manages the action at a poker table.

== Professional dealers ==
Any casino with a poker room must hire a staff of dealers. Casinos generally pay dealers minimum wage. However, a dealer's primary source of income is not salary, but tips from players. Tip income may be substantial for dealers who can deal hands quickly and efficiently. There are a few exceptions for taking tips. (e.g., in Sweden, where all the casinos are owned by the state, dealers and other casino personnel may not accept tips from players. This rule is complied with strictly.)

To become employable by a casino, applicants without prior experience are typically required to complete a 4 to 6 week training program at a dealing school. Dealing in a casino may require working late hours and remaining seated for long periods of time. Dealers also commonly work holidays, since these are especially busy days for casinos. Having to deal with difficult individuals or abusive players may be another drawback to dealing at a casino.

Major poker tournaments also hire dealers. For a given tournament stop, the tournament coordinator will hire dealers on contract for the duration of the tournament, which may be a few days to a few weeks. Room and board may or may not be provided by the tournament management; the dealer is typically responsible for their own travel expenses.

== Mechanics of dealing ==
Dealers must be proficient in shuffling the deck, distributing the cards to the players, and, if required by the game being dealt, turning up the community cards in the center of the table. There are two methods of distributing the cards, "American"-style and "European"-style.

=== Shuffling ===
To shuffle the cards, the dealer follows a sequence defined by the casino. First all cards are spread out on the table and pushed around randomly. This is called "scrambling" or "washing" the cards. Then the cards are collected and squared into a deck. At this point a typical shuffling sequence might be: riffle, riffle, box, riffle. Professional dealers always keep both halves of the deck very low to the table while shuffling. Some casinos have automatic shufflers built into the table that shuffle a different deck of cards while the previous hand is being played, which speeds up the game.

Finally, a cut card is placed on the table and the deck is cut onto the card. The cut card is held on the bottom of the deck for the entire hand, to keep the bottom card from being exposed.

=== American-style dealing ===
In American-style dealing, the deck is held in one hand, and the dealer uses the thumb of their deck hand to slide the top card of the deck toward their pitching hand. The pitching hand clasps the card between the thumb and index finger while at the same time the mid-point of the card touches the face (nail) of the middle finger. It is the extension of the middle finger that "pitches" the card off the top of the deck and a whooshing sound should be heard as each card exits the top of the deck.

The ability to pitch cards accurately is critical, since the cards must be delivered in a way that no players at the table can see the undersides of the cards.

=== European-style dealing ===
European-style dealers touch only the top of each card being dealt. The card is pushed off the top of the deck to the table surface in front of the dealer. The dealer then propels the card toward the recipient, usually imparting some spin to the card to encourage sliding.

=== Burning and turning ===
Before dealing a community card, the top card off the deck is burned, or discarded. The rationale for burning is that the top card on the deck is visible to players during the previous betting round, so that a cheat might be able to spot a mark on the top card and therefore gain an advantage on his opponents.

When burning, the deck must be held low and the burn card kept level with the table surface. Casinos watch carefully to make sure a dealer does not "flash", or inadvertently expose, the burn cards to players at the table.

In flop games, the three community cards comprising the flop are turned up simultaneously, never one at a time.

== Responsibilities during a hand ==
Dealers control the action during a hand. This may include prodding players to act, verbally announcing actions of players to the rest of the table, and correcting players who act out of turn.

Dealers also must manage the pot. The dealer must verify the amount of bets and raises by players, collect folded hands, maintain side pots, and read players' hands at showdown to identify the winner or winners. In games with a rake, the dealer also must keep track of the amount of money in the pot and remove the appropriate amount for the house.

At times the dealer needs to communicate with the floor, or other casino staff. Some casinos equip the dealers with a headset or walkie-talkie for this purpose, while in other casinos the dealer must shout over the ambient noise. The following table shows some common calls a dealer may make, and their meanings:

Call	Meaning
"Floor" or "Decision"	Requests the floor manager to come to resolve a dispute.
"Seat open"	Announces that a player has left the game and a seat is now available.
"Player in"	Notifies the floor or brush that a vacant seat has been filled.
"Players checks"	Requests a chip runner to retrieve chips for a player.
"Fill"	Requests a chip runner to bring chips to fill the dealer tray. This tray must be kept full of low denomination chips in a high limit game, so that change may be made in the pot so that the rake may be taken out.
"Set up"	Requests replacement decks be brought to the table.
"Pick up"	For cash games, used when an absent player's chips should be removed from the table to free the seat. Also, for single-table satellites, used to request the staff to come collect the cash entry fees from the table.
"Playover"	Alerts the floor that a new player will be playing in a seat taken by an absent player, until the absent player returns. Usually a "playover box" or some other object is used to separate the seated player's money and chips from those of the person playing over.
"Winner"	Used in single-table satellites to announce that the game has completed and the prize is to be paid.
"Brush"	Calls the floor to deal with a game participation problem, for example if a game must be broken due to insufficient players.
"Service" or "Cocktails"	Alerts the floor that a player wants a beverage and/or food.

== Online dealing ==
Online poker sites use Random number generation (RNGs) when dealing cards. A successful RNG distributes cards in an unpredictable and random way.

== See also ==
- Croupier
- Cocktail waitress
