= Chip race =

Event in poker tournaments

A chip race is an event that takes place in poker tournaments, especially those with an escalating blinds (such as Texas hold 'em), in which chips of denominations that are no longer needed (as the current and upcoming blinds are more easily played with larger chip values) are removed from play. This has the effect of reducing the number of physical chips in front of any player, and makes it easier for the players to count their stacks and their bets.

In a typical chip race:

1. All players color up their lesser-valued chips into greater denominations. For example, if the blinds have increased to a level where $5 chips are no longer needed to post blinds, each five $5 chips will be exchanged for a $25 chip. Players will temporarily keep any leftover chips that cannot be fully colored up to larger chips (less than 5 $5 chips in the above example).
2. All leftover chips are counted, and equivalent chips in the larger denomination are presented to the table. Continuing the example, if there are 15 $5 chips remaining among 6 players, 3 $25 chips are prepared. In the event the remaining smaller chips do not add up to a whole larger chip, an extra larger chip should be added as long as the leftover smaller chips total at least half a single larger chip.
3. Each player with leftover chips in the smaller denomination will receive one card for each chip. The cards are typically dealt face up, starting from seat one, to the dealer's left. Each player due to receive cards will receive all of his cards before the next player, rather than a "traditional" card deal; the player on the small blind, for example, who is due to receive three cards for his three chips, will receive all three of his cards before the big blind receives any.
4. The larger chips are issued to the players with the highest single cards showing (poker hands do not count). No player is issued more than one chip. Ties (cards of the same rank) are broken by suit, using the same bridge (ascending alphabetical) order of the suits: Spades are highest, followed by Hearts, Diamonds, and Clubs. All remaining lesser-value chips are removed from play.

A chip race cannot eliminate a player from the game. In the event a player's last smaller-denomination chips are removed from play as part of the chip race, they automatically get one chip of the lowest value still in play.

To make it easier to manage the chip race, it is advised that one player at the table (normally the player who currently holds most of the chips that are about to be eliminated) buys up all the smaller chips from the other player's stacks and exchanges them with chips of equal value in higher denomination. Having all the chips in one stack makes it easier to count up and exchange.
