= Protection (poker) =

Type of poker bet

Protection in poker is a bet made with a strong but vulnerable hand, such as top pair when straight or flush draws are possible. The bet forces opponents with draws to either call with insufficient pot odds, or to fold, both of which are profitable for the betting player. By contrast, if he failed to protect his hand, another player could draw out on him at no cost, meaning he gets no value from his made hand.

A protection play differs from a bluff in that the bluff can win only when the opponent folds, while protection bet is made with a hand that is likely to win a showdown, but isn't strong enough for slow playing.

The importance of protection increases when there are multiple opponents. For example, if a hand is currently the best, but each of four opponents has a 1-in-6 chance of drawing an out, the four opponents combined become the favorite to win, even though each one is individually an underdog. With a protection bet, some or all of them may fold, leaving fewer opponents and a better chance of winning.

The term protection is also often heard in the context of an all-in player (see poker table stakes rules). A bet by an opponent serves to protect the all-in player by reducing the number of opponents the all-in player must beat. To deliberately make such a bet solely to protect another player's hand constitutes collusion.

A player may also be said to "protect" their cards by placing an object like a specialty chip or miniature figure upon them. This prevents the player from having his cards accidentally collected by the dealer or being fouled by other players' discards.

== See also ==
- Poker jargon
- Glossary of poker terms
