= Non-standard poker hand =

Hands not recognized by official poker rules

Non-standard poker hands are hands which are not recognized by official poker rules but are made by house rules. Non-standard hands usually appear in games using wild cards or bugs. Other terms for nonstandard hands are special hands or freak hands. Because the hands are defined by house rules, the composition and ranking of these hands is subject to variation. Any player participating in a game with non-standard hands should be sure to determine the exact rules of the game before play begins.

== Types ==
The usual hierarchy of poker hands from highest to lowest runs as follows (standard poker hands are in italics):

- Flush Five: Five cards of the same rank and suit.
- Royal Flush: The highest straight flush, A-K-Q-J-10 suited.
- Skeet flush: The same cards as a skeet (see below) but all in the same suit.
- Flush House: A Full House (see below) where all the cards are of the same suit.
- Five of a kind
- Straight flush: When wild cards are used, a wild card becomes whichever card is necessary to complete the straight flush, or the higher of the two cards that can complete an open-ended straight flush. For example, in the hand 10♠ 9♠ (Wild) 7♠ 6♠, it becomes the 8♠, and in the hand (Wild) Q♦ J♦ 10♦ 9♦, it plays as the K♦ (even though the 8♦ would also make a straight flush).
- Straight Flush House: A Straight (see below) containing cards of only two suits, where three cards in order are one suit and the next two in order are the other.
- Four of a kind: Between two equal sets of four of a kind (possible in wild card and community card poker games or with multiple or extended decks), the kicker determines the winner.
- Big bobtail: A four-card straight flush (four cards of the same suit in consecutive order).
- Full house
- Flush: When wild cards are used, a wild card contained in a flush is considered to be of the highest rank not already present in the hand. For example, in the hand (Wild) 10♥ 8♥ 5♥ 4♥, the wild card plays as the A♥, but in the hand A♣ K♣ (Wild) 9♣ 6♣, it plays as the Q♣. (As noted above, if a wild card would complete a straight flush, it will play as the card that would make the highest possible hand.) A variation is the double-ace flush rule, in which a wild card in a flush always plays as an ace, even if one is already present (unless the wild card would complete a straight flush). In such a game, the hand A♠ (Wild) 9♠ 5♠ 2♠ would defeat A♦ K♦ Q♦ 10♦ 8♦ (the wild card playing as an imaginary second A♠), whereas by the standard rules it would lose (because even with the wild card playing as a K♠, the latter hand's Q♦ outranks the former's 9♠).

Five and Dime

Skeet

Bobtail Flush
- Big cat: See cats and dogs below.
- Little cat: See cats and dogs below.
- Big dog: See cats and dogs below.
- Little dog: See cats and dogs below.
- Straight: When wild cards are used, the wild card becomes whichever rank is necessary to complete the straight. If two different ranks would complete a straight, it becomes the higher. For example, in the hand J♦ 10♠ 9♣ (Wild) 7♠, the wild card plays as an 8 (of any suit; it doesn't matter). In the hand (Wild) 6♥ 5♦ 4♥ 3♦, it plays as a 7 (even though a 2 would also make a straight).
- Wrap-around straight: Also called a round-the-corner straight, consecutive cards including an ace which counts as both the high and low card. (Example Q-K-A-2-3).
- Skip straight: Also called alternate straight, Dutch straight, skipper, or kangaroo straight, Cards are in consecutive order, skipping every second rank (example 3-5-7-9-J).
- Five and dime: 5-low, 10-high, with no pair (example 5-6-7-8-10).
- Skeet: Also called pelter or bracket, a hand with a deuce (2), a 5, and a 9, plus two other un-paired cards lower than 9 (example 2-4-5-6-9).
- Three of a kind
- Little bobtail: A three-card straight flush (three cards of the same suit in consecutive order).
- Flash: One card of each suit plus a joker.
- Blaze: Also called blazer, all cards are jacks, queens, and/or kings.
- Two pair: any two pair of the same cards regardless of suit.
- Bobtail flush: Also called four flush, Four cards of the same suit.
- Bobtail straight: Also called four straight, four cards in consecutive order.
- One pair: any pair of the same cards regardless of suit.
- High card: any five cards of sequential rank or non-sequential rank regardless of suit such as A-K-Q-T-9, or T-9-7-6-4.

Some poker games are played with a deck that has been stripped of certain cards, usually low-ranking ones. For example, the Australian game of Manila uses a 32-card deck in which all cards below the rank of 7 are removed, and Mexican Stud removes the 8s, 9s, and 10s. In both of these games, a flush ranks above a full house, because having fewer cards of each suit available makes full houses more common.

== Cats and dogs ==
"Cats" (or "tigers") and "dogs" are types of no-pair hands defined by their highest and lowest cards. The remaining three cards are kickers. Dogs and cats rank above straights and below Straight Flush houses. Usually, when cats and dogs are played, they are the only unconventional hands allowed.

- Little dog: Seven high, two low (for example, 7-6-4-3-2). It ranks just above a straight, and below a Straight Flush House or any other cat or dog. In standard poker seven high is the lowest hand possible.
- Big dog: Ace high, nine low (for example, A-K-J-10-9). Ranks above a straight or little dog, and below a Straight Flush House or cat.
- Little cat (or little tiger): Eight high, three low. Ranks above a straight or any dog, but below a Straight Flush House or big cat.
- Big cat (or big tiger): King high, eight low. It ranks just below a Straight Flush House, and above a straight or any other cat or dog.

Some play that dog or cat flushes beat a straight flush, under the reasoning that a plain dog or cat beats a plain straight. This makes the big cat flush the highest hand in the game.

== Kilters ==
A Kilter, also called Kelter, is a generic term for a number of different non-standard hands. Depending on house rules, a Kilter may be a Skeet, a Little Cat, a Skip Straight, or some variation of one of these hands. According to Paul Anthony Jones, it can simply mean a hand of little value. According to Penn Jillette and Mickey D. Lynn, a Kelter is "a nonstandard hand given value in home games."

== See also ==
- Bug (poker)
- List of poker hands
- Wild card (card games)
