= Calling station =

Calling station is a poker term used to pejoratively describe someone who consistently calls bets and rarely (if ever) raises, regardless of the strength of his or her hand.

In games (especially limit games) with many calling stations, an effect called schooling can cause calling stations to accidentally play less incorrectly. For example, it is often incorrect to draw to an inside straight because the probability of making the draw is too low to justify the expense of calling a bet to see the next card. However, the presence of many calling stations can inflate the size of the pot, making it correct, or at least less incorrect, to draw to inside straights and other longshot draws.

In poker tournaments with rebuys, calling stations are common as they will often call bets with marginal hands in order to gain chips as a result of outdrawing their opponents. If they lose the hand, they can simply stake their 'buy-in' again and re-enter the tournament with the designated amount of starting chips. This is even common among well-known and skilled players, with the mindset being that they will either accrue a large amount of chips or there will be a large amount of chips in play at their table after rebuying, and their presence in the tournament is not at risk during the rebuy period.

Correct play against calling stations can require strategy adjustments such as typically playing strong hands strongly (without deception), and not betting on marginal hands.

== See also ==
- Morton's theorem
