= Slow play =

Type of deceptive play in poker

Slow playing (also called sandbagging or trapping) is a deceptive play in poker where a player bets weakly or passively with a strong holding. It is the opposite of fast playing. A flat call can be a form of slow playing. The objective of slow playing is to lure opponents into a pot who might fold to a raise, or to cause them to bet more strongly than they would if the player had played aggressively (bet or raised). Slow playing sacrifices protection against hands that may improve and risks losing the pot-building value of a bet if the opponent also checks.

David Sklansky defines the following conditions for profitable slow plays:

- A player must have a very strong hand.
- The free card or cheap card the player is allowing to his opponents must have good possibilities of making them a second-best hand.
- That same free card must have little chance of giving an opponent a better hand or even giving them a draw to a better hand on the next round with sufficient pot odds to justify a call.
- The player must believe that he will drive out opponents by showing aggression, but can win a big pot if the opponents stay in the pot.
- The pot must not yet be very large.

Seven-card stud example
In a seven-card stud game, Ted's first three cards are all fours. Alice with a king showing bets first, Ted raises and Alice calls. On the next round, Alice catches another king, and Ted miraculously catches the last four (making four-of-a-kind). Ted suspects Alice has two pair or three kings, and Alice suspects that Ted has two pair or three fours. Alice bets again, and Ted just flat calls. Ted decides to just call for next round or two, and maybe even check if Alice doesn't bet, rather than raising, for several reasons. Ted's hand is so strong that the chance of getting beaten is negligible, so he doesn't need protection. If Alice just has two pair and Ted acts strongly, Alice may think Ted has three fours and fold if she doesn't improve. By allowing Alice to continue for smaller stakes, Ted hopes that Alice will improve to a very strong (but second best) hand that will induce her to bet, raise, or at least call in the later betting rounds.

== Relationship between slow playing and bluffing ==
Against observant opponents, the frequency of bluffing affects the effectiveness of slow playing, and vice versa. If a player's table image is that of an aggressive bluffer, slow playing is less important because his opponents will be more willing to call his usual bets and raises. Similarly, if a player is perceived as a "trappy" player (uses frequent slow plays), his bluffs are less likely to be respected (i.e., more likely to be called) because his opponents expect him to slow play his strong hands.

== Check raising as a slow play ==
A check-raise is not necessarily a slow play. Often, the purpose of a check-raise is to drive out opponents from a pot, which is the opposite of the goal of a slow play. However, within the context of a single betting round, check-raising can be employed as a slow play.

Draw poker example
Alice, Bob, Carol, and David are playing draw poker. After anteing, Alice starts with a pair of aces, and opens the betting for $2. Bob raises an additional $2, bringing the bet to $4. Carol folds. David calls the $4, and Alice puts in an additional $2 to match the raise. Drawing three cards, she receives another ace, and a pair of fives. Since her aces-full is almost certain to be unbeatable, it does not need the protection of a bet. Also, Bob earlier raised, and David called a raise, so they likely have strong hands and one of them will bet if Alice doesn't. Finally, since Bob and David earlier showed strength, and they know that Alice knows this, Alice betting into them would be seen as a bold move likely to scare one or both of them off, especially if they weren't as strong as they seem. Alice decides conditions are right for a slow play: Alice checks. As she hoped, Bob bets $2. David thinks for a minute, then calls the $2. Alice now springs the trap and raises $2. Bob calls the additional $2, and David (who now realizes that he is probably beaten) folds. Bob reveals three sixes, and surrenders the pot to Alice. If Alice had just bet her hand on the second round, it is likely that Bob would just have called and David may or may not have called, earning Alice $2 to $4 on the second round. But with the slow play, she earned $6.

Even in games (such as California lowball) where the check-raise is not allowed, one can make other sandbagging plays such as just flat calling instead of raising with a very strong hand and then later raising.

== Fishing for the overcall ==
Fishing for the overcall occurs when the last card a player is dealt makes him a very strong hand, an opponent in front of him bets, and there are more opponents yet to act behind him. While the player might normally raise with his hand, just calling may encourage the opponents behind him to overcall when they would have folded to a raise. For this play to be used profitably, one or more conditions like the following must be met:

- The original bettor is all-in and therefore has no money to call a raise.
- The player is confident that the original bettor was bluffing and would not call a raise.
- There are several opponents yet to act. If there is only one opponent yet to act, then getting the overcall would gain no more money than raising and having the initial bettor call.
- The opponents are likely to overcall the initial bet, but not a raise. This play sacrifices the profit that might have been made from opponents who would have overcalled a raise.

A common example of fishing for overcalls occurs in High-low split games like Omaha hold 'em. If John is confident that Mary is betting a high hand, then John might flat call with his low hand to fish for overcalls rather than make it more difficult for opponents to call. If John were to raise, he and Mary would gain no profit at all if no other opponents called.

== See also ==
- Bluff (poker)
- Poker jargon
