= Showdown (poker) =

Situation near the end of a poker round

In poker, the showdown is the situation when, if more than one player remains after the final betting round, the remaining players expose and compare their hands to determine the winner or winners.

To win any part of a pot at showdown, a player must show all of their cards faceup on the table, whether those cards were used in the final hand played or not. Cards speak for themselves: the actual value of a player's hand prevails in the event a player mis-states the value of their hand. Because exposing a losing hand gives information to an opponent, players may be reluctant to expose their hands until after their opponents have done so and will muck their losing hands without exposing them. Robert's Rules of Poker state that the last player to take aggressive action by a bet or raise is the first to show the hand—unless everyone checks (or is all-in) on the last round of betting, then the first player to the left of the dealer button is the first to show the hand.

If there is a side pot, players involved in the side pot should show their hands before anyone who is all-in for only the main pot. To speed up the game, a player holding a probable winner is encouraged to show the hand without delay. Any player who has been dealt in may request to see any hand that is eligible to participate in the showdown, even if the hand has been mucked. This option is generally only used when a player suspects collusion or some other sort of cheating by other players. When the privilege is abused by a player (i.e. the player does not suspect cheating, but asks to see the cards just to get insight on another player's style or betting patterns), they may be warned by the dealer, or even removed from the table.

There has been a recent trend in public cardroom rules to limit the ability of players to request to see mucked losing hands at the showdown. Specifically, some cardrooms only grant the right to view a mucked losing hand if the requesting player articulates a concern about possible collusion. Under such rules, players do not have an inherent right to view mucked hands.
