= Cash game =

Poker game with real money at stake

Western Union messengers playing a cash game in Hartford in 1909.

Cash games, also sometimes referred to as ring games or live action games, are poker games played with "real" chips and money at stake. Cash games often have no predetermined end time, and players are able to enter and leave as they see fit. In contrast, a poker tournament is played with tournament chips worth nothing outside the tournament, with a definite end condition (usually, only one player left), and a specific roster of competitors.

== Rules ==
Players may freely buy into or cash out of a cash game between hands. However, it is normally prohibited for a player to remove a portion of their chips from the table. This is known as "going south". For example, if a player buys in for $100, then wins $100 (for a total stack of $200), the player may not remove the original $100 buy-in while remaining seated. The player would have to forfeit their seat, possibly wait to rejoin the game, and buy-in again for $100. However, many cardrooms prohibit the practice of buying in again unless a certain amount of time has elapsed before the player rejoins. Similarly, cash games are played for table stakes. If a player attempts to put additional money onto the table (from his/her wallet) in the middle of a hand, they may not do so until the conclusion of said hand.

In "no limit" poker cash games, some cardrooms have a maximum buy-in for cash games. In limit poker games, there is rarely a maximum buy-in because betting limits already restrict the amount a player can wager on each hand.

In a casino, a rake is usually taken from a pot if a flop is shown and the pot reaches certain values. Some games take a time rake instead of a pot rake. In these games players pay a seat charge every half-hour.

== Ring games ==
While the terms "ring game" and "cash game" are often considered synonymous in common usage, opinion differs on the true definition of "ring game". For example, in the glossary of Doyle Brunson's Super System 2, a ring game is defined as "A game with a player in every seat, that is, a full game—as opposed to a shorthanded game". As such, the term "cash game" may be considered a more precise depiction of the kind of game commonly found in most casinos or home venues; that is, a non-tournament game played for actual money (or chips representing money), without regard for the number of players seated at the table at any given time.

== Comparison with tournament games ==
Tournaments and cash games have different basic strategies. One difference between tournaments and cash games is that the blind/ante structure of tournaments increases periodically over the course of the tournament, whereas the blind/ante structure of cash games remains constant. Another difference between tournaments and cash games is that a tournament sticks with a predetermined style of poker, and cash game players, depending on house rules, may have the option of playing other types of card games. Some online cash games offer a variety of choices limited only by the game software.

Other differences between cash games and tournament poker are that, in cash games sometimes straddles and chops are allowed. A live straddle is a dark bet of two big blinds by the player first to act, who is then entitled to bet again if the bet is not raised. A chop is an agreement between the players in the blinds to retract their blind bets if nobody else has bet. A chop prevents the casino from taking a rake from the pot. Also, cash games sometimes let players reduce the element of luck (often called "variance", especially by professional players) by splitting large all-in pots. Since online platforms can instantly calculate each player's pot equity at the time they go all-in, some online cash games allow such pots to be split based on this equity. Players who opt for such an arrangement will receive a share of the pot based on their odds of winning (from the time all players still in the pot exposed their cards) once each of the cards have been dealt. An alternative method of reducing variance, used both online and in live games, is to run the board multiple times to ensure that the person with the best odds of winning receives the largest share of the pot more often.

== Examples ==
An example of a cash game is broadcast on the United States subscription-based streaming service PokerGO as High Stakes Poker. The Bellagio casino's "Big Game" is a high-stakes permanent cash game, featuring a wide variety of rotating poker games with and without limits.
