= Check-raise =

Deceptive play in poker

A check-raise in poker is a common deceptive play in which a player checks early in a betting round, hoping someone else will open. The player who checked then raises in the same round.

This might be done, for example, when the first player believes that an opponent has an inferior hand and will not call a direct bet, but that they may attempt to bluff, allowing the first player to win more money than they would by betting straightforwardly. The key point is that if no one else is keen to bet, then the most a player can raise by (in a limit game) is one single bet. If someone else bets first, they can raise, thus increasing the value of the pot by two bets. In a no-limit game, there is no restriction on the size of one's bet, and a raise is likely to be much larger than the second player's bet. Of course, if no other player chooses to open, the betting will be checked around and the play will have failed to elicit additional money for the pot. Like a simple check, a failed check-raise provides other players an opportunity to view the next card or cards dealt without requiring the other players to commit more money to the pot. A check-raise thus contains an element of risk because the check-raising player's advantage may deteriorate when new cards are revealed.

While it can be an important part of one's poker strategy, this play is not allowed by a house rule in some home games and certain small-stakes casino games. It is also frequently not allowed in the game of California lowball. In older poker material and among stud and draw poker players, it is sometimes referred to as sandbagging.

Check-raises can also be used as an intimidation technique over the course of a game; a player who has frequently been check-raised may be less likely to attempt to steal the pot.

In online poker games special tracking software can be used to determine the exact percentage of times a player check-raised when they had the opportunity. This information helps to determine if a player who check-raised has a monster hand or is bluffing as part of their routine poker play.

Not all players agree that a check-raise is an especially effective play, however. In Super/System, Doyle Brunson claims to check-raise very rarely in no-limit hold 'em; he contends that it is more profitable to simply bet a quality hand, regardless of whether his opponent will try to bluff. His reasoning for this is twofold: First, a failed check-raise gives other players the chance to see free cards that may improve their hand; second, it makes it obvious to other players that you potentially have a very strong hand. The latter, however, may be used as a strong bluff technique, although the opponent could put in a re-raise to scare off a bluff.

== See also ==
- Poker jargon
