= Pot (poker) =

Sum of money in the card game

The pot in poker refers to the sum of money that players wager during a single hand or game, according to the betting rules of the variant being played. It is likely that the word pot is related to or derived from the word jackpot.

At the conclusion of a hand, either by all but one player folding, or by showdown, the pot is won or shared by the player or players holding the winning cards. Sometimes a pot can be split between many players. This is particularly true in high-low games where not only the highest hand can win, but under appropriate conditions, the lowest hand will win a share of the pot.

See "all in" for more information about side pots.

== See also ==
- Glossary of poker terms
