= Draw poker =

Card game

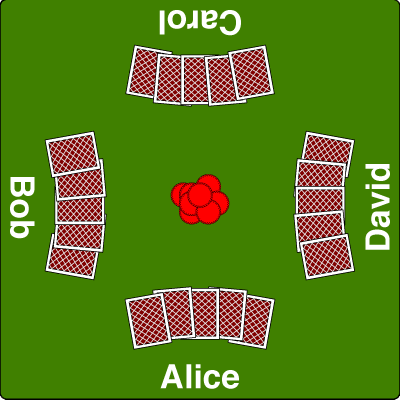
An example of a draw poker table

Draw poker is any poker variant in which each player is dealt a complete hand before the first betting round, and then develops the hand for later rounds by replacing, or "drawing", cards.

The descriptions below assume the reader is familiar with the general game play of poker, and with hand values (both high and low variations). They also make no assumptions about what betting structure is used. In home games, it is typical to use an ante, and betting always begins with the player to the dealer's left. In casino play, it is more common to use blinds; the first betting round thus begins with the player to the left of the big blind, and subsequent rounds begin with the player to the dealer's left, thus draw games are very positional.

Some sample deals below will assume that a game is being played by four players: Alice, who is dealing in the examples, Bob, who is sitting to her left, Carol to his left, and David to Carol's left.

== Standard five-card draw ==
This is often the first poker variant learned by most players, and is very common in home games although it is now quite rare in casino and tournament play. Two to eight players can play.

== Other draw games ==
=== Gardena jackpots ("Jacks to open" or simply "Jackpots") ===
Played as above, with standard hand values, and with a single joker in the deck acting as a bug. It is always played with an ante and no blinds. On the first betting round, no player is allowed to open the betting unless their hand already contains a pair of jacks or a better hand. Other players who checked on the first round may subsequently call or raise if someone else opens. If no player opens, a new deal begins and everyone antes again into the same pot. The player who opened the betting keeps their discarded cards near them on the table so that they can prove, if necessary, that they had a sufficient opening hand. For example, a player with the K♣ J♣ 9♣ 7♣ and the J♥ has a pair of jacks and may open. They may wish to "break openers" in this case by discarding the jack of hearts in an attempt to make the club flush, so they keep the discarded jack to prove that they were entitled to open.

In addition to the opening requirement, no one is allowed to win a pot with less than three of a kind. In the event no one makes the winning requirement, the pot is moved on to the next hand. The strongest possible hand in this game is five aces which is achieved if the player obtains the four aces plus the joker (joker counts as an ace if there's neither a straight nor a flush to complete).

This can result in some enormous pots, and is where the term 'Jackpot' comes from.

The game is named after the city of Gardena, California, where this game was especially popular from the 1930s to 1970s (though it was always secondary to lowball). At that time, there were more public poker tables in that small city than in all the rest of the United States. Public poker rooms are still a big industry there, though Las Vegas, Atlantic City, and other locations now have many more poker rooms than they did at that time. Because "Jacks to open" was the primary form of high-hand draw poker played there, traditional draw poker was often described by the retronym "Guts to open".

In home games, it is common that when a deal is "passed out" (that is, when no one opens), the players re-ante, and the qualifier to open is raised to a pair of queens. If that deal is passed out, the qualifier is raised to kings, and finally to aces. This is called "progressive" jackpots.

=== California lowball ===
This was the primary poker game played in California during the heyday of Gardena in the 1970s. It is still played today, though its popularity has somewhat lessened since the introduction of stud poker and community card poker to the state.

Played as above, using ace-to-five low hand values, with a single joker in the deck. Always played with blinds rather than antes, so players may not check on the first betting round (but may on the second round). A player with a 7-high hand or better who checks after the draw forfeits their right to win any money placed in the pot after the draw. (In other words, a "seven" may not be checked unless the player intends to fold when another player bets). Another common rule in low-limit games is that a player who checks on the second betting round may not subsequently raise on that round. This latter rule is never used in games with a pot limit or no limit betting structure.

=== Kansas City lowball ===
Five-card draw, with no joker, and deuce-to-seven low hand values is called "Kansas City" or "Low Poker" or even "Billy Baxter" draw in honor of the player who dominated the world championship in the event for many years. Often the game is played no-limit. The 7-high rule and the no check-and-raise rule do not apply. In the eastern United States, the United Kingdom, and elsewhere, ace-to-six low hand values are common.

=== Double-draw and Triple-draw ===
Any game above can be played with two or three draw phases and therefore three or four betting rounds. Triple draw lowball, either ace-to-five or deuce-to-seven, has gained some popularity among serious players. The 2004 World Series of Poker included a deuce-to-seven triple-draw lowball event, and each WSOP from 2007 on has featured one event as well. The Poker Player's Championship, which was introduced in 2010 as the replacement for the $50,000 buy-in HORSE tournament that had been in every WSOP since 2006, includes 2–7 triple-draw lowball as one of its rotating games.

=== Badugi ===
Sometimes spelled as Padooki or Badougi, Badugi is a four-card ace-to-five low lowball variant where traditional poker hand rankings are changed. A Badugi is a four-card hand where all the cards are of different ranks and suits. Any card which match another card in rank or suit does not play and the first criterion for evaluating hands is the number of cards which are playing. The following is the ranking of several example of hands from best to worst:

1. A♠ 2♣ 3♥ 4♦ — 4-card 4-high best possible Badugi
2. 4♠ 6♥ 8♦ J♣ — 4-card J-high Badugi
3. 10♣ J♥ Q♦ K♠ — 4-card worst possible Badugi
4. A♥ A♦ 4♣ 5♠ — 3-card hand, 5-high
5. A♣ A♠ 4♠ 6♠ — 2-card hand, 4-high
6. K♣ K♥ K♦ K♠ — 1-card hand, worst possible hand

Badugi is usually played triple-draw, with a 1-1-2-2 betting structure, although it is sometimes played in pot limit or 1/2 pot limit structures.

=== Baduci ===
Not to be confused with Badugi, Baduci is a lowball hybrid of Badugi and deuce-to-seven triple draw low. This game has a split pot, one half for the strongest Badugi hand and the other half for the best deuce-to-seven triple draw hand. Players are essentially trying to form two different sets of hands by using five cards with a goal of winning both halves of the pot in the same hand.

=== California high/low split ===
Played as above, with a single joker, used as a bug. High hand and low hand (using the ace-to-five low values) split the pot. An 8-high or better low is required to win low. If no hand qualifies for low, the high hand takes the whole pot. Played cards speak, that is, players do not declare whether they intend to win the high or low half of the pot (or both); they simply show their cards and the best hands win. Because ace-to-five low values are used, a hand such as a low straight or flush can win both high and low, called "scooping" or "hogging" the pot.

=== High/low with declare ===
This is common in home games but is rarely found in casinos today. Played as are other versions of five-card draw, but after the second betting round and before the showdown, there is a simultaneous declaration phase. Each player takes two chips from their stack and takes them under the table, bringing up a closed fist that contains either no chips (indicating that the player intends to win the low half of the pot), one chip (indicating that the player intends to win the high half), or two chips (indicating their intention to scoop). When everyone has brought up the closed fist, the players all open their hands simultaneously to reveal their choices. If any player shows two chips and has the best low and the best high, that player scoops the pot. Otherwise, half of the pot goes to the player with the highest hand who declared high, and the other half to the player with the lowest hand of those who declared low. There is no qualifying hand to win either high or low, and if no one declares in one direction, the full pot is awarded in the other (for example, if all players declare low, the low hand wins the whole pot rather than half). A player who declares for a scoop must win both ends outright, with no ties. For example, if a player declares scoop, has the lowest hand clearly but ties for high, they win nothing. The other player with the same high hand wins the high half of the pot and the next-lowest hand wins low (assuming they declared low—if no other player declared low, the high hand who declared high wins the whole pot).

This game can be played with deuce-to-seven low or ace-to-six low hand values, but in that case it is nearly impossible to scoop (though the whole pot could still be won if everyone declares the same direction).

=== Four-before ===
Another variation that can be applied to any game above, but that is especially suited to lowball. On the initial deal, only four cards are dealt to each player. A betting round follows, then each player draws one more card before discarding commences, completing their hand to five cards. Then the final betting round and showdown. Note that it is impossible to be dealt a "pat" hand, that is, a hand (such as a straight or flush) that is complete before the draw.

=== Football Poker ===
Football Poker is a draw poker game played with a bespoke deck of 36 cards made up of three suits (soccer teams): reds, blues and stars. Each team contains 12 cards and each card represents a footballer in a specific playing position. The aim of Football Poker is to build a 3-card hard made up of one defender, one midfielder and one striker - a micro football team, that outscores the hands of your opponents.

- Three cards are dealt to each player
- Two additional cards are placed, face-up, in the middle of the table (these represent footballers available for transfer)
- By turn, from the left of the dealer, each player discards one of their cards, placing it face-up on the table in front of them (these cards also represent footballers that have been made available for transfer)
- All players are now holding two cards with one face-up card in front of them, and there are also two face-up cards in the middle of the table. ALL of the face-up cards (representing individual footballers) are available for selection in the next round
- The player who has discarded the card (footballer) with the highest monetary value (this is marked on the card) now has first choice and selects any one of the face-up cards on the table OR takes a chance and selects the top (face-down) card from the stock deck to complete their final hand - a micro team of three footballers.
- The player to the left of the player choosing the first card now takes their turn and selects any one of the remaining face-up cards on the table OR takes a chance and selects the top (face-down) card from the stock deck. Then the player to their left does the same - and so on until all players are once again holding three cards in their hand - this is their final hand

The aim for each player is to assemble a football team with one defender, one midfielder and one striker, ideally all from the same colour team and with as many 'gold' cards as possible. Hands are ranked by Football Poker scoring rules.

Two rounds of betting (typical poker style - with checking, raising or folding) now take place.

=== Johnson (and "Jacks back") ===
Played with one joker which acts as a bug. Must be played with antes and no blinds. Each player is dealt five cards. The first betting round begins with the player to the dealer's left, who may check or open with anything. If any player opens, the game continues as traditional five-card draw poker. If the first round is passed out (that is, no one opens), then the player to the dealer's left may now open if they choose to, but the game has switched to California lowball. On the rare occasion that the deal is passed out yet again, players re-ante and deal again. This game plays well head-up (that is, with only two players). When the game is played that a pair of jacks or better is required to open on the first high-hand round, the game is called "Jacks back".

=== Q-Ball ===
This is a lowball game designed by Michael Wiesenberg that combines some of the variations mentioned above. It is generally played with three blinds—one unit from the dealer, one unit to their left, and two units for the second player to the dealer's left. The deck contains one joker. Each player is dealt three cards, followed by a round of betting beginning with the player immediately after the big blind who may call the big blind, raise, or fold (there is no checking on the first round). Next, each player is dealt a fourth card, followed by a second round of betting starting with the still-active player to the dealer's left. No checking is allowed on this round either, despite the fact that there is no bet facing the first player; the first player must open or fold. Each player is then dealt a fifth card, followed by a third betting round beginning on the dealer's left. At this point, checking is allowed. Finally, each player draws as in normal draw poker, followed by a fourth betting round and showdown. Ace-to-five low values are used.

Played at fixed limit, it is recommended that the betting structure be 1-2-2-4; that is, the second and third betting rounds should allow a bet of twice the amount of the first round, and the final bet should allow four times the amount of the first round.

=== Seven-card draw ===
Same rules as Five-card draw, except played with seven cards instead of five. The player uses the five cards which give them the highest hand, and ignore the other two. This version is usually limited to home games, and it is not as prevalent as Five-card draw.

== "Home" games ==
These are somewhat less-serious games that are typically played only in home games at small stakes. This does not necessarily mean that there is less opportunity for skillful play, just that the games are seen as more social than competitive.

To help grow the betting pot in a home game, one can add a variant known as the "kill card" to the rules. Kill cards work best with stud games or shared card games as no one player can control when the "kill card" is played.

=== Shotgun ("Roll 'em out" and "Skinny Minnie") ===
This is a draw game that plays much like a stud game. First five cards are dealt to each player, followed by a betting round, and a draw. Now, in place of a second round and showdown, there is a rollout phase, which begins with the players arranging their five cards in any chosen order, placing them face down in front of themselves. Each player's top card is now revealed, followed by a betting round. Then each player reveals their next card, followed by a betting round. Then a third card is revealed, followed by a betting round, a fourth card, a betting round, and finally a showdown. Players may not change the order of their cards at any time during the rollout phase.

This game can be played for high or low, but plays best at high-low split, in which case it is called "Skinny Minnie".

=== Spit in the ocean ===
This might be classified as a hybrid draw/Community card game, but it is placed here because it plays mostly as a draw game. On the initial deal, each player is dealt four cards, and then a single card is dealt to the center of the table face up. This card plays as if it were the fifth card in every player's hand. It is also a wild card, and every other card of its rank is also wild. The first betting round is then played, followed by a draw in which each player replaces cards from their hand with an equal number, so that each player still has only four cards in hand. A final betting round is followed by a showdown. High-hand values are used. (An alternative is to deal similar to a regular draw poker hand, during which any player can shout "Spit!", whereupon the next card is dealt face up, after which dealing resumes until all players have five cards. In some variants, only the "spit" card can be used as a wild card.)

Here's a sample deal: Alice deals four cards to each player, then deals the next card face up to the center of the table. It is the 6♦, and this makes all 6-spot cards wild. Bob opens for $1, Carol raises to $2, David folds, Alice and Bob call. Bob discards two cards, and receives two replacements. Carol draws one card, and Alice draws one. Bob checks, Carol bets $2, Alice raises to $4, Bob folds, Carol reraises to $6, and Alice calls. The cards in Carol's hand are Q♣ Q♥ 6♣ 4♠. Because the 6 in her hand and the one on the board are wild, her hand is four queens. Alice's hand contains K♠ J♠ 9♠ 7♠, all spades. With the shared wild card, this gives her a flush, which loses to Carol's four queens.

The game is mentioned in the Ray Stevens song "Shriner's Convention".

=== Anaconda ("Pass the trash") ===
Seven cards are dealt to each player. Before the first betting round, each player examines their hand, removes exactly three cards from it, then places them on the table to their left. After each person has thus discarded, they pick up the cards discarded by their right-hand neighbor and places them in their hand (thus, everyone will have given three cards to their left-hand neighbor). It is important that each player discard before looking at the cards to be received. After the first pass, there is a betting round. Then a second pass occurs, each player passing two cards to their right. A second betting round is followed by a third pass, each player passing one card to their left. Finally, a third betting round and a showdown, in which the player with the best five-card high hand made out of the seven in hand wins the pot.

In some casual games, the showdown is replaced by a rollout phase, as described above in "Shotgun". This makes a total of eight betting rounds in the game, which generally destroys any chance for skillful play in the later rounds.

== Ad hoc variants ==
Any of the above games can be modified in many ways upon player whim, by designating additional wild cards, betting rounds, more or fewer cards, altered hand values, and any other change agreed upon by all players prior to each deal. Such a game can be announced by using the name of an existing game and specifying the variations, for example "Three-card Triple-draw California lowball, Kings wild". Many times this will result in a game that does not play well, but occasionally will produce a game that is well-suited to a particular group of players.

Here are some general guidelines:

- If designating some normal suited cards as wild, it is advisable to choose cards that would otherwise be bad for the game being played. For example, deuces wild for high-hand games, kings wild for lowball, 9-spots wild for high-low split (where an 8-high or lower is necessary to win low).
- High-low split games play best with more than four players.
- When playing high-low split, it is necessary to have either a declaration phase or a qualifier (but not both). The most common form is 8-high or better to qualify low, but also common is any pair/no pair (that is, a pair or better is required to win high, and no pair or better low is required to win low), and 9-high for low.
- Designating more than four wild cards (or possibly six) will result in considerable confusion and many ties.
- Two to five betting rounds makes a good game. One round or more than five rounds reduces the amount of skill involved.
- Sometimes there is no betting round before the draw; players pick up their cards, discard and draw, and then the betting starts.
- Giving each player more than eight or nine cards can often make a bad game. In Anaconda, each player will have seen up to thirteen cards.

== See also ==
- Glossary of poker terms
- List of poker hands
- Omaha hold'em
- Pick a Partner Poker
- Poker strategy
- Texas hold 'em
- Video poker
