= Open-face Chinese poker =

Card game

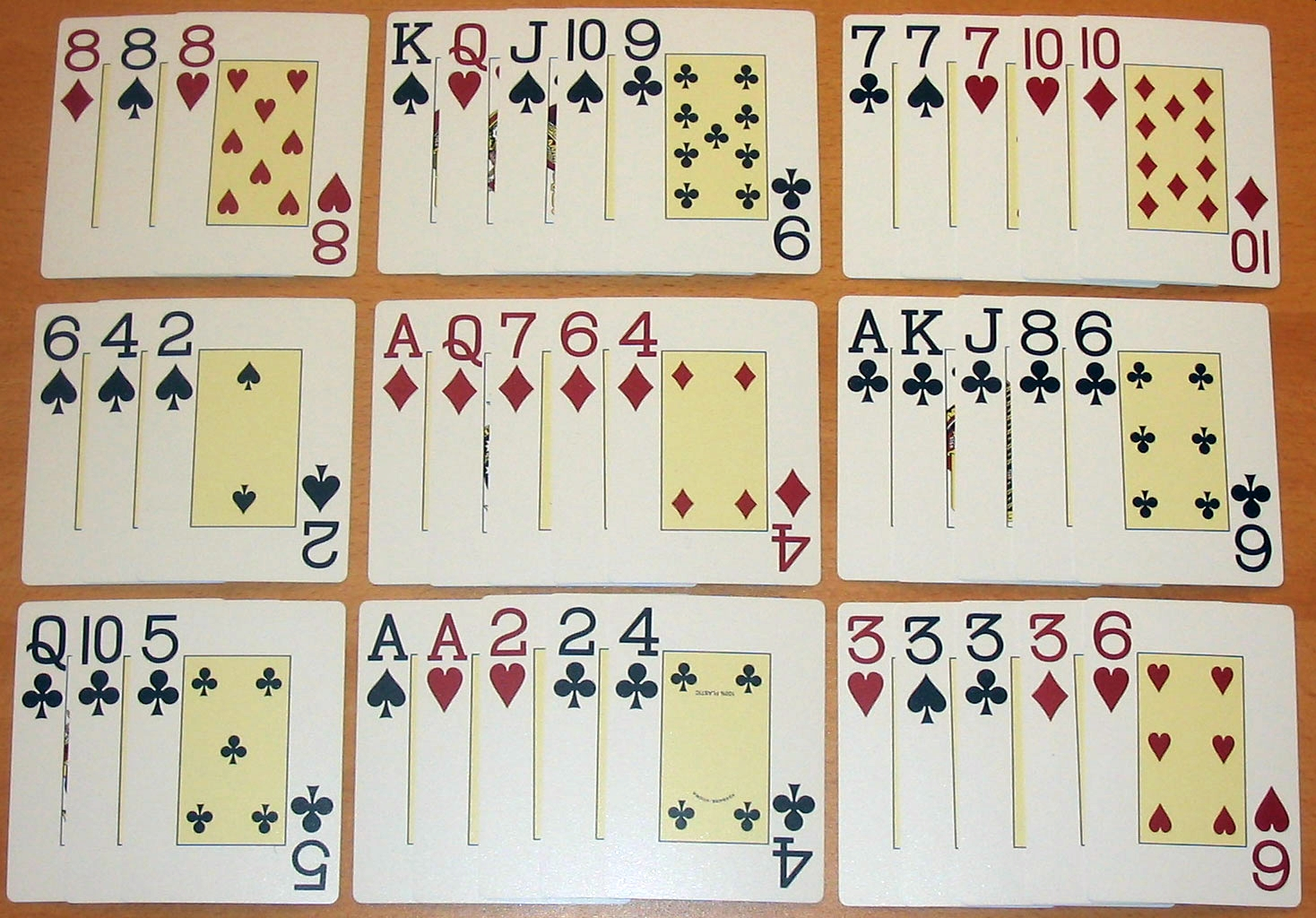
- Standard Chinese poker hands
- Origin: Finland
- Alternative names: Open Face Chinese, OFC, OFCP
- Players: 2–4
- Skills: Tactics, strategy
- Cards: 52
- Deck: French
- Rank (high→low): A K Q J 10 9 8 7 6 5 4 3 2
- Play: Clockwise
- Playing time: 5 -10 min. per round
- Chance: Medium to High

Related games
- Chinese poker Pai gow poker

Open-face Chinese poker, OFCP, commonly known as Open Face Chinese or OFC, is a variant of Chinese poker where players receive five cards to start and then one card at a time until each player has a 13 card hand legal or not. The game originated in Finland during the mid-2000s and spread to Russia a few years later. Professional poker player Alex Kravchenko, who is credited with introducing the game to the Russian high-stakes community, describes the game as "spreading like a virus". The game was introduced to the United States in 2012.

In December 2014, TonyBet hosted the first-ever World Championship of OFC where Jennifer Shahade won the High Roller and Mikal Blomlie won the Main Event. On Monday, Dec. 7th, 2015, TonyBet Poker Ambassador Isabelle Mercier became the first Open-Face Chinese Poker Progressive Pineapple world champion.

== Gameplay ==
Open-face Chinese poker is typically played as a two- to three-person game, though it can also be played with four people. Each player must use thirteen cards consisting of 3 cards in the front hand, 5 cards in the middle hand, and 5 cards in the back hand. Play is in clockwise order and starts with the player left of the dealer. As in standard Chinese poker, the back hand must be stronger than or equal to the middle hand and the middle hand must be stronger than or equal to the front hand. The strength of the hand is determined by poker hand rankings. The middle and back can make the best five-card poker hand while the front hand can only make the best three-card hand. The best front hand is three aces. Straights, flushes, and straight flushes are not legal front hands.

=== Objective ===
The goal of the game is to achieve more units (also known as points) than your opponents by winning more hands also known as rows and/or by collecting royalties on premium hands without fouling. See fouling for more details.

To win rows, your hand ranking must be higher than your opponents' in that same row, for example:

	Ivey	Hellmuth	Winner
Front	6♠ 6♣ 4♥	A♥ K♦ Q♦	Ivey
Middle	10♦ 10♠ 9♣ Q♠ 8♣	9♥ 9♦ 5♥ 5♦ 4♣	Hellmuth
Back	3♥ 3♦ 3♠ 2♥ 2♦	K♠ J♠ 9♠ 8♠ 7♠	Ivey

Ivey would win the front row and back row, but lose the middle row. See scoring for more details.

==== Fouling ====
Fouling also known as mis-setting is when an illegal hand is made and as a result, the hand is forfeited. The back hand must be stronger than or equal to the middle and the front, the middle must be stronger or equal to the front, otherwise, the hand is not legal and is considered fouled. In this case the player who fouled loses six points (one point per line plus three-point scoop bonus) per non-fouling player and each non-fouling player gains six points. Players who fouled can lose additional units if players with legal hands achieved royalties. Opponents with legal hands gains six points plus any royalties in their hands, but not the royalties in fouled hands. When a hand is fouled the fouling players loses all royalties in their hands as well. If more than one player foul, then the players who foul tie other players who foul and no points are gained or lost between players with fouled hands. Unlike standard Chinese poker, players do not receive all thirteen cards at once. Therefore, fouling plays a large factor, and strategies are devised to avoid it.

Legal hand structure
Row/Hand	Strength of hand
Front (3 cards)	3rd / Weakest hand
Middle (5 cards)	2nd / Stronger
Back (5 cards)	1st / Strongest

=== Dealing ===
Unlike standard Chinese poker where all thirteen cards are dealt at once, in open face Chinese each player is dealt five cards in the beginning and then one card at a time until thirteen card hands are made (8 deals after 5 cards are dealt). The cards are all set face up. The dealer deals clockwise with the player to the left of the dealer acting first. In the beginning it is not necessary to set cards in each row. Players can set all cards in three or fewer rows depending on their preference. For example, if a player receives A♣ 2♦ 3♠ 4♥ 5♣ as the first five cards he or she can set them all on the back or middle row if desired. Once a row has been completed (e.g. 3 cards in the front or 5 cards in the middle or back) then another open row must be picked. Once a card has been set it cannot be moved to a different row.

=== Fantasyland ===
Fantasyland is a special bonus awarded to players that make a hand that has a pair of queens (QQx) or stronger in the front hand and does not foul. When fantasyland is achieved, the next hand, the player receives all thirteen cards dealt at once while other players must play out the hand as standard open face. Players in fantasyland set their hand face down when it is their turn to act. Players can fantasyland repeatedly if they are able to make the required hand. If a player makes fantasyland while already in fantasyland, he or she must declare it to all opponents. However, to remain in fantasyland while in fantasyland requires higher royalties, one or more of the following conditions must be met:

Remain in Fantasyland
Row/Hand	Strength of hand
Front (and/or)	Any three of a kind
Middle (and/or)	Full house or higher
Back (and/or)	Four of a kind or higher

More than one player can achieve fantasyland. Another way of stating how to stay in fantasyland would be one must score a 10-point royalty or higher in any sub-hand.

=== Shooting the moon ===
If a player has J-high in the back hand and does not foul, he or she receives 20 units from all other players. Shooting the moon is rarely found in open face Chinese poker games, and is generally reserved for kitchen table home games.

== Scoring ==
The stakes played for in Chinese poker are known as units or points: an amount of money agreed on per unit before the game starts. Basic scoring rules dictate that a player collects one unit from each opponent whose front, middle or back hand is beaten by his own corresponding hand. Thus, unlike most poker games, being second-best at the table is good enough to win money. In some variants players are also paid an additional unit if they win in two or three of the hands. In other variants players only get an additional unit if they win all three hands (known as a scoop). Also, due to the head-to-head nature of the comparisons, it is possible for different players to play for different stakes. For example, A and B could play for $10 per unit versus each other, while all other player pairings play for $1 per unit. Many variations of scoring are in common use; refer to the external links for more information.

The most common scoring system used in Open-face Chinese poker is the 1–6 scoring method.

In the 1–6 method the players receives 1 unit for each hand they win, and 3 bonus units if they win all three hands from a player known as a scoop. Players lose 1 unit for each hand they lose to each player and lose 3 bonus units to each player who scoops them.

In the example above, Hellmuth would pay Ivey 4 units, as Hellmuth scored 5 units, while Ivey scored 9. The difference is 4, and therefore Hellmuth would pay Ivey 4 units. Hellmuth received 5 units by scoring 1 unit for winning the middle hand, and 4 units for a flush royalty in the back. The total becomes 5. Ivey scored 9 units by scoring 1 unit for the winning the top, 1 unit for a pair of 6 royalty up top, 1 unit for winning the bottom, and 6 units for a full house royalty on the bottom. The total becomes 9.

Points are added to the winner and subtracted from the loser as the game progresses. If a game has more than two players, players gain a point for each hand/row they win from each player and lose a point for each hand/row they lose from each player. Royalty points are also scored based on the number of players involved. For example, a player with a completed back hand flush in a three player game would receive an 8-point bonus, 4 per player excluding royalties in any non-fouled opponents' hands. If other players do not have royalties, they would lose 4 points each otherwise, players would calculate the difference between the royalties achieve in their own legal hands.

=== Royalties ===
Royalties, or bonuses as they are sometimes called, are extra units that may be awarded to players with particularly strong hands. Hands that qualify for royalties in Open-face Chinese are lower than that of standard Chinese poker as hands formed are generally weaker.

Open Face Chinese poker royalties
Front	Units	Middle	Units	Back	Units
66	1	Three of a kind	2	Straight	2
77	2	Straight	4	Flush	4
88	3	Flush	8	Full house	6
99	4	Full house	12	Four of a kind	10
TT	5	Four of a kind	20	Straight flush	15
JJ	6	Straight flush	30	Royal flush	25
QQ	7	Royal flush	50		
KK	8				
AA	9				
222	10				
333	11				
444	12				
555	13				
666	14				
777	15				
888	16				
999	17				
TTT	18				
JJJ	19				
QQQ	20				
KKK	21				
AAA	22				

Other variations play with naturals and can be scored the same as standard Chinese poker or to the players preference.

Like standard Chinese poker, in open face Chinese royalties cancel out. For example, if one player has 7777x in the back and another has 6666x in the back, the player with 7777x would win 1 unit for the back hand/row but not the royalty units. Even if a player loses a hand/row he is eligible for the royalties in the hand as long as it is not fouled.

== Chinese Poker Variants ==
Pineapple Open Face Chinese poker (POFC)
Pineapple poker can be played with a maximum of three players. On the first deal, players are dealt five cards and play all five. On subsequent deals, players are dealt three cards, set two cards and discard one. This process continues until 13 card hands are made by each player. Players are dealt to and play in turns and players can see the placements of players that play before them. If a player achieves fantasyland, the player receives 14 cards and discards one on their next hand. To enter fantasyland, traditional OFC rules apply. To remain in fantasyland requires a three of a kind on top and/or four of a kind or better on the bottom. A full house in the middle does not qualify to remain in fantasyland.

In practice, there are a number of Pineapple variants played in tournaments and online. A non-exhaustive list of Pineapple variants follows:

- Using KK+ or AA+ as a minimum requirement to enter fantasyland.
- Rewarding more cards in fantasyland for better pairs entering fantasyland (14 for QQ, 15 for KK, 16 for AA, 17 for trips). This variant is commonly known as "Progressive" Pineapple.
- Allowing a full house or better in the middle row to qualify to stay in fantasyland.
- Playing the middle row as a lowball hand. In this variant, any hand rank stronger than a 10-high card in the middle is considered a foul. The normal rules requiring the bottom hand being stronger than the top hand remain, but the middle hand does not need any ranking against the other two hands.
Double deck open face Chinese poker
In this variant two decks of cards are shuffled together and both used in the game, allowing more people to play, Double deck pineapple can also be played. Apart from this the games are played using the same rules as the single deck games. Some players suggest a AA+ as a minimum requirement for fantasy land. By using two decks it is possible to get 5 of a kind; some suggest giving this hand the same royalties as the straight flush.

== Live tournaments ==
PokerStars hosted a live OFC tournament in the 2013 PokerStars Caribbean Adventure.

OFC has never been featured at the World Series of Poker, only in the Carnivale of Poker. The Carnivale of Poker is a smaller tournament series that had a brief run, organized by the WSOP.

OFC is not common in live tournaments. This is mainly due to not being mainstream like other variants of poker such as no-limit hold'em. However, other issues are caused by having 3 players maximum per table, unlike other poker tournaments that can have 10 players per table, and the number of dealers that would therefore be required. These factors make live tournaments logistically difficult and unprofitable for operators.
