= Dirty Schultz poker =

Dirty Schultz is a stud poker variant similar to Follow the Queen. The core difference between this and normal stud is that players dealt a visible pair acquire an additional wild card.

== Rules ==
Play proceeds as follows ("player" refers only to those who have not folded and are still in the game), with betting rounds in-between.

Betting is clockwise, the player with the lowest card showing starts.

The action is dealt as follows:

- Two cards dealt face down to each player.
- One card dealt face up (up card) to each player (Third Street).
- Upcard to each player (Fourth Street).
- Upcard to each player (Fifth Street).
- Upcard to each player (Sixth Street).
- Downcard to each player (Seventh Street).
- Showdown.

If a player has a natural pair showing (for example they have two Jacks face up, a pair made including the face down card does not count) the next card they are dealt becomes a wild card. So for example if the player needs a 6 to make three-of-a-kind, the next card out would count as a 6 no matter what its actual value.

If a second natural pair is dealt, the new wild card replaces the old wild card, meaning that the original wild card reverts to its original value.

If the final face up card completes the natural pair, nothing is wild. An alternate variant of the game states that the wild card is instead dealt as a community card, and all cards of the same rank are wild for all players. So for example if a player is dealt a natural pair of Queens and the next card dealt to the community which is an Ace, any Ace held by any player is now wild.

== Variations ==
Dirty Schultz is a version of Follow the Queen, which goes by the same rules except that a wild card is drawn for anyone showing a Queen.

Follow the King is another version, with the wild card being drawn for anyone showing a King.

A less popular variant of the game states that if a player has any pair including using their face down card then the next card is wild. There are variations as to when the player must announce they have a pair, but it is usually when it is their normal turn to act.

Alternative name(s)	Follow the Pair, Change the Diaper
Type	Stud Poker
Players	2+, usually 2–9
Skill(s) required	Probability, Psychology
Cards	52
Deck	French
Play	Clockwise
Card rank (highest to lowest)	A K Q J 10 9 8 7 6 5 4 3 2
Random chance	Medium to high
