= Guts (card game) =

Card game

Guts is a comparing card game, or family of card games, related to poker. Guts is a gambling game involving a series of deals of 2, 3, or 4 cards. Hand are ranked similarly to hands in poker. The betting during each deal is simple : all players decide whether they are "in" or "out", and announce this at the same time. Each deal has its own showdown, after which the losers match or increase the pot, which grows rapidly. A round of the game ends when only one person stays in and wins the pot.

== Basic rules ==
In "Two-Card Guts", each player is dealt down, two hole-cards, at the beginning of a new deal. Two Card Poker rankings apply; Pairs are ranked over high cards; however there are no 'straights' or 'flushes' in two card guts (or two card poker).

One variation of 2-card guts, ranks 23 (of any suits) as the highest ranking hand, trumping AA (pocket aces). Even though getting dealt 23 is more probable than AA (16 possible combinations of 23 compared to only 6 combinations of AA, or 1.2% vs 0.45% respectively), rather, it's the role reversal of the worst hand in heads-up, two-card poker. The name for the 23 hand, in this variation, is called the "Royal Crumpler", among other names.

All players have a chance to say 'in' or 'out' at the same time by holding out one or two fingers, or holding a chip or nothing in their hands; those who are 'in' have a showdown.

Each round starts with an ante. The players then play a series of deals; after each one, the winner takes the existing pot and the losers match it, so that the pot or some multiple of it carries over to the next deal.

For example, if the pot is $5 and three people stay in, then one player will receive the $5 pot and two players will be forced to add $5 each to the next pot, escalating the size of the pot for the next deal. Then the hand is re-dealt, and all players (even those who were "out" in the last round) can participate again. The round ends when only a single player has the guts to stay "in", and thus the pot is taken without replenishment.

Declaring "in" or "out" is similar to declaring high or low in high-low games. Each player takes a chip, places their hands under the table, and either places the chip in one fist or not. Each player then holds their closed fist above the table, and the players simultaneously open their hands to reveal their decision (a chip represents "in", an empty hand represents "out").

== Rapid pot growth ==
One of the characteristics of guts is that the pot grows quickly. As it can double or more each round, pots of 50 or 100 times the original ante are possible.

There are many variations. Sometimes only the single player with the worst hand (who stayed in) must add to the pot, but they must double the pot rather than match it. In one variation, nobody wins the pot unless nobody else stays in.

One solution to the exponentially growing pots is to cap them at 50x or 100x the ante. That is, if there are 5 players with an ante of $1, the pot started at $5. If there were 3 doublings, the pot is now at $40. Suppose the "cap the pot at $50" rule were in force. Then, if another doubling occurred, each loser would pay $40, but the pot would now be at $50 and the extra $30 would be set aside as the ante once there's a hand with a winner and no loser.

== Common variants ==
straights and flushes
In some variants, straights and flushes count for two-card guts (making them higher than other no-pair hands). In others, straights and flushes do not count for three-card guts.

high three of a kind
Some variations for three-card guts rank three of a kind above a straight flush, but the latter occurs less frequently.

partial hands
Each player receives all but one card face down, and if they are in, they receive their last card face up.

dummy hands
Many variants include a dummy hand that must be beaten if only one person stays in. In some variants, rather than a dummy hand, you must have a pair or better. In others, the dummy hand always plays against the other hands, and may be called "Granny", "The Kitty", "Herb", or "The Pot".

The Batey
one community card is flipped over from the top of the deck after all hands have been dealt which each player uses in making their hand. Named after its inventor, Justin Batey

dealer option
In variants where players do not declare all at the same time, the dealer declares last; if no other player has stayed in, the other players sometimes have another chance to declare and challenge the dealer. With this variation, there is generally no dummy hand.

chicken fee
If no one stays in for a hand (more common in variants where there is a dummy hand to beat), everyone has to pay another ante on the next deal.

Henry Rule
Similar to the chicken fee. If no one stays in, the player with the hand that would have won must match the pot.

One low "in" and wild
In this three card game, everyone is dealt one card face up. The player with the lowest card face up is automatically in, but that number is wild.

Two low "in" and wild
In this three card game, everyone at one point is dealt a card face up. The people with the two lowest cards are automatically in but these card numbers are also wild.(If more than one person has the same number card, then more than two people can be in.)

Hi-Lo
When deciding to stay in, each player also indicates high or low, usually by having a high-valued chip in hand for high, low-valued for low, or none for folding. If multiple players stay in, the best hand among those indicating high gets half the pot and the others have to match the pot. Similarly for low. Usually played with a dummy hand which has to be beaten in the appropriate direction to take the pot. If no dummy hand is played, a single player choosing high can take half of the pot uncontested even if other (low) players are in the game. Some games also allow "Hi-Lo" option, usually indicated by both a high-valued chip and a low-valued chip in hand at the reveal. The player going "Hi-Lo" competes amongst both the high players and the low-players, and is usually only a good idea with hands such as ace-deuce.

No Peek
A pure gambling game, each player gets two (or three) cards, but cannot look at them before deciding to stay in.

Winner Takes All
The winner of a round gets the pot and all the money matched by losers. This variant is usually played with a dummy hand and a chicken fee. The pot will only grow if there is a chicken fee and no players stay in, or if there is a dummy hand and the sole remaining player loses to it.

School Bus
In this variant, the highest possible combination of the two-card hand is the 6 and 9, for obvious reasons. Any player who loses against this hand must then double the pot in the next round.

=== Nuts ===
There is a variant of Guts called Nuts. Each player is required to place a certain amount of money in the pot. For example, the bet starts with one dollar. With five players, there would be five dollars in the pot. Each player is dealt two cards, and the lowest cards win (Pairs are strong). If a player is "in" and no other players are, the player gets a "nut." If two players go in, then neither gets a nut. These two players have to compete their cards against each other. The lower cards win, and the loser has to pay the winner money equivalent to the pot, in this case five dollars.

When the third card is dealt, the best cards are the highest cards. Here the process of in and out is repeated. With the fourth card, the low cards are the best. Then with the fifth and last card, the higher the better. When a player gets three nuts, he or she will get the pot. If three nuts are not awarded within the first round, a second round is needed. With the second round, each player adds a dollar to the pot, so the pot doubles. This continues until someone gets three nuts, and thus the pot.

== Similar games ==
There are a few other games which share the geometric pot growth and in/out betting of guts.

=== Toh ===
Toh is a high-card game in which players act in order to decide whether they are in or out, as in guts. There is a balance between the number of players and the number of points/cards needed to win; this number of points is announced before the game begins. The game is designed for 4 to 10 people. 4 players might play to 5 points, 8 or more players to only 3 points.

The rules of the game are as follows: the pot is seeded with a penny. Each hand, every player is dealt one card face down. The deal rotates. After each deal, discards are kept in a separate discard pile; as long as there are enough cards in the remaining deck to deal the next hand, there is no reshuffling. (In a friendly game, the last hand before a reshuffle may be announced as such.) Each player in turn announces whether they are in or out. If only the dealer stays in, players have a second chance to stay in as well.

At the showdown, the losers match the pot, and the winner keeps the high card face up next to her. High card wins; card value increases by suit, club-diamond-heart-spade. The first player to reach the declared number of points wins the game, and takes the pot.
