= Dealer's choice =

Style of poker

Dealer's choice is a style of poker where each player may deal a different variant. As the deal passes clockwise around the table, each player occupying the dealer position chooses a variant which is either played just for the current hand or for an entire orbit. It is a common choice for home games, where the tone of the game is usually more recreational than competitive. It is also rarely played online, due to the complexities involved in creating the appropriate algorithms that would allow the format of poker to change during each hand, or orbit.

Dealer's choice games often break from the typical forms of poker through the use of wild cards and kill cards in addition to variations on betting structure. The majority of the dealer's choice poker games were derived from children's games.

Depending on house rules, dealers may also call card games that are not true poker variants, such as acey deucey, screw your neighbor, and guts.

There are two different approaches to a standard DC game:

- Per hand: In this type of format the player on the button (known as the dealer) selects the format of poker to play for that hand only. After the hand is over the dealer button moves to the left and the next player in that position chooses the next format of poker that will be played.
- Per orbit: In this type of format the player on the button (known as the dealer) selects the format of poker to play for the next orbit, which is an entire revolution of the table. So, for example, if the game was being played at a nine-handed table then an orbit would last nine hands.

== Poker variants ==
The varieties of poker wholly depend on the level of knowledge and understanding on the table that you are playing. In home games, players will agree in advance the types of games that can be chosen, and then they are selected at random by each player.

In casino games, the games are normally shown on a rolodex, and players can either choose a game from the rolodex, or it is spun in order for the choice of game to be entirely random.

The most popular form of poker in the world (No Limit Texas hold'em) is rarely played in Dealer's Choice. There are many reasons for this, but the most common is the fact that people play Dealer's Choice to get away from the regularity of playing No Limit Hold'em. That being said, it is a game that many beginners will choose to play if they are unfamiliar with the other mixed games.
