= Asia Poker =

Casino table game

Asia Poker is a casino table game similar to Pai gow poker which can be found in Atlantic City, New Jersey. Players are dealt seven cards and divide their cards into three hands: a four-card hand (High), a two-card hand (Medium) and a one-card hand (Low). The four-card hand must be equal or greater in poker ranking than the two-card hand and the two-card hand must be equal or greater than the one-card hand. After all players have set their hand, the dealer sets the house's hand according to the "house way" and then compares each player's hand to the house's hand. If the house wins at least two out of three hands, the player loses. If the player wins at least two or out of three hands the player wins.

Unlike Pai gow poker, the casino does not charge a 5% vigorish for winning wagers. Rather, the house edge comes from winning all "copy hands" (a player's hand that is identical to the house's hand). Also, unlike Pai gow poker there are no ties in this game; the player either wins or loses. The House edge is approximately 3%, based on the probability of the player having a losing copy hand.

In Asia Poker, a straight or flush can be played only in the four-card hand and they beat three-of-a-kind or worse. The best High hand is four-of-a-kind and the second best is a straight flush. The best Medium hand is two aces and the best Low hand is an ace.
