= Pick a Partner Poker =

Poker variant

Pick a Partner is a variant of draw poker which requires players to work as a team. It must be played with an even number of players (at least four) because it requires them to work in pairs and combine their hands.

== Rules ==
Everyone is dealt a five-card poker hand face down, then chooses one card each to expose. The player with the highest hand selects another player as a partner. They are not obliged to show their strongest card.

Then the next available player with the highest card picks their partner, until everyone is paired up. The players then combine their remaining eight cards, choose three of them and discard the remaining five face-down cards.

This leaves them with three face-down cards, and their two face up cards from when they partnered up. A betting round then takes place, starting from the left of the dealer.

In every subsequent betting round every player reveals another face down card simultaneously before the betting takes place. The players are not obliged to reveal their strongest cards on each subsequent round and can choose whichever card they want to reveal next.

This continues until every team's hand is revealed, four betting rounds in total. The winning hand takes the pot.

== Variations ==
Another variant sees the players take it in turns to reveal their card in the same order they go around in the betting, rather than all simultaneously, giving an informational advantage to players who get to act last each round.

Type	Draw poker
Players	4 or more, usually 4–8; number of players has to be an even number
Skills required	Probability, psychology
Cards	52
Deck	French
Play	Clockwise
Card rank (highest to lowest)	A K Q J 10 9 8 7 6 5 4 3 2
Random chance	Medium to high
