= Dooly's =

Chain of billiard halls

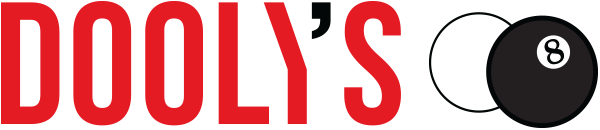
- Company type: Private
- Founded: March 1993
- Founder: Bernard Cyr
- Headquarters: Moncton, New Brunswick, Canada
- Number of locations: 55
- Area served: Atlantic Canada, Quebec
- Key people: Bernard Cyr (CEO)
- Products: Billiard hall
- Website: www.doolys.ca

Dooly's is a chain of billiard halls primarily operating in Atlantic Canada and Quebec. It was founded in 1993 in Moncton, New Brunswick.

== History ==
Dooly's was established in March 1993 by Bernard Cyr, opening its first location in Moncton. By 1995, the company had over 20 locations and further expanded to 91 locations across seven provinces by the company's tenth anniversary in 2003. Dooly's diversified by hosting poker games though this led to legal issues, particularly with hosting Texas hold 'em tournaments. The chain began closures throughout the 2000s and 2010s, with locations outside of the Atlantic Canada region closing, including the downtown St. John's site. The company currently has 55 locations.
