= Five-O Poker =

Social network game

Five-O Poker is a social network game that follows the same hand ranking as traditional poker.

== Features ==
The game is played by two players, 1-on-1 (heads-up), who are dealt five alternate face-up cards each, lined up in a row. In turn, each player draws a card from the deck and places it face-up on one of the five cards that they have, building a column or a hand. In each round, players must place one card on each of their columns before continuing to build the other columns: the columns must be equal in each round. The fourth card in each hand is played face-down, and the fifth card face-up. Four of the five cards in each hand are face-up, so both players are privy to their opponent’s hands. Eventually, each player will have five hands of five cards, each.

What truly separates Five-O from other Poker variants is that competitors are playing five hands at the same time, giving an added dimension to the classic Poker game.

Once all five hands are down, there is a single round of betting. The winner is determined by matching each hand to the corresponding hand of the opponent. The player with the stronger poker hand in three (or more) out of the five columns, wins (unless a player folds on a bet that was made). If a player beats their opponent with all five hands, this is called a “Five-O” win.

== Reception ==
Five-O Poker has 22,000 monthly active players and 4,000 daily active players.
