= Wall Street Poker =

Wall Street Poker is a form of stud poker which also features community cards. It is named after the financial district of New York and the movie of the same name, because of a strategy of aggressive bidding involved.

== Rules ==
Players are initially dealt three hole cards, two face down, one face up. Everyone pays an ante.

Four community cards are then dealt face up, each with a different value, this is called the Wall Street. Each round then starts with the player with the strongest hand showing. For example, a showing pair would beat a high card.

Rather than a betting round taking place, a bidding round occurs, where players choose whether to buy a community card. The card on the left of the dealer costs one betting unit, the next card two betting units, the next card three betting units and the card to the right of the dealer costs four betting units. The fee for the card then goes into the pot. If a player chooses to purchase one of the cards it is replaced from the top of the deck.

If they choose not to purchase a card, they are dealt one for free face up. This process repeats until every player has four face up cards. So for example if the minimum bid was $1, and a player is dealt a pair of Kings, if a King is the third community card to the left of the dealer, it would cost them $3 to take the King.

Players are then dealt a face down card and a final betting round takes place.

== Variations ==
There are also wild card versions of this game where the most expensive card can be a wild card, meaning that it has any value the player wants it to be. For example, if a Queen is needed to make a straight, it would cost four betting units but a player could purchase the wild card to count as the Queen. Another version of the game plays in the following way:

1. All players pay the antes.
2. Four cards are dealt face up on the table.
3. The furthest left card (from the dealer perspective) is marked with a chip.
4. All players are dealt two cards.
5. Every player now has the option to decide: (a) to get a third card from the dealer which is dealt face up; (b) to buy one of the four cards that were dealt previously, with the card to the left of the dealer costing one betting unit, the next card two betting units, the next card three betting units and the card to the right of the dealer costing four betting units.
6. The first betting round takes place. When played with antes, each pot is opened by the player who shows the weakest hand. They have to pay the bring-in and can also raise.
7. Again every player can decide to get a card from the dealer or to buy a card from the Wall Street.
8. Second betting round.
9. There are three more betting rounds. Before each round each player draws an additional card. Cards five and six are dealt face up, card seven is dealt face down.

Type	Stud poker / Community card poker
Players	2+, usually 2–9
Skill(s) required	Probability, psychology
Cards	52
Deck	French
Play	Clockwise
Card rank (highest to lowest)	A K Q J 10 9 8 7 6 5 4 3 2
Random chance	Medium to high
