= Declaration (poker) =

Action in poker

There are several actions in poker called declaration, in which a player formally expresses his intent to take some action (which he may perform at a later point). For example, one may verbally declare an action such as fold, call, raise (bet) while in turn, which obligates the player to complete that action. One may declare a number of cards to draw in a draw poker game (which is typically not binding), or one may declare some other choice specific to the variant being played.

But most commonly, the term refers to the declaration in the final phase of a high-low split game, in which players indicate whether their hands are to be evaluated as high hands, low hands, or both at showdown. This is only one option for high-low split games; the other is known as "cards speak", in which players simply reveal their hands at showdown and award the pot to the highest and lowest hands shown (possibly subject to qualifications). Cards speak is used commonly in casinos because it is the much simpler method. High-low with declaration is common in home games.

== Methods of declaration ==
First, declarations can be made either in turn or simultaneously.

Games with verbal in-turn declarations (called "last raise declares") are uncommon, because the positional value of declaring last is so great. Some think that makes the game unfair. Others see it merely as strategy, making the game more interesting, because players may alter their betting in the last rounds to get the position of declaring last or after a certain player. Also, if all the other remaining players declare one way, the last player to declare can then call the other way and take half the pot regardless of the actual rank of his hand.

Simultaneous declarations are commonly done by the "chips in hand" method. Each player remaining in the game takes two chips or coins below the table, then brings up a closed hand containing zero, one, or two of the chips. After all players have brought their closed hands above the table, they all then open their hands to reveal their choices: for example, no chips in the hand means the player is declaring "low", one chip "high", and two chips "swing" (both ways).

Some games then have another round of betting after the declaration, called "bet/declare/bet", which clearly gives an advantage if there is just one person going a certain way.

== Awarding the pot ==
After declaration and showdown, half of the pot is awarded to the highest hand among those players who declared high, and half to the lowest hand among those who declared low. If no one declared in one direction, the whole pot is awarded to the other (for example, if all players declared low, the lowest hand is awarded the whole pot).

If any player declared "swing", then that player must have both the high and low hands to take any part of the pot, though there are several rule variations covering the specifics. First, if the rules specify that ties are acceptable, then a player declaring swing must win or tie both directions to win anything, but if he does, he is entitled to his appropriate share. For example, if the swing player has the clearly highest hand but shares the lowest hand with another player, he wins three-fourths of the pot and the other low hand wins one-fourth. If the rules specify that ties are not acceptable, then a swing player must clearly win both directions: even a tie in one direction means he wins nothing.

If a swing player fails for half the pot, the half that he would have otherwise won can be awarded either to the second-best hand in that direction, or to the player who defeated him in the other. The latter rule affords more strategic possibilities in declaration. For example, if a player declaring swing has the best high hand but loses for low (or ties for low with a no-ties rule), the whole pot is awarded to the low hand that defeated him.

A rule must be adopted for the case where no player is eligible to win the pot (for example, if all players declare swing, and no player winds both ways). Some possible rules include playing the hand as a no-declare hand, or having the pot ride over to the next hand.
