= Pai gow poker =

Americanized version of pai gow with cards

- Origin: United States
- Players: 2–7
- Deck: French
- Rank (high→low): A K Q J 10 9 8 7 6 5 4 3 2
- Play: Clockwise
- Chance: High

Related games
- Chinese poker

Pai gow poker (also called double-hand poker) is a version of pai gow that is played with French-suited playing cards rather than Chinese dominoes. The game of pai gow poker was created in 1985 in the United States by Sam Torosian, owner of the Bell Card Club.

The game is played with a standard 52-card deck, plus a single joker. It is played on a table set for six players, plus the dealer. Each player attempts to defeat the banker (who may be the casino dealer, one of the other players at the table, or a player acting in tandem with the dealer as co-bankers).

== Winning condition ==
The object of pai gow poker is to create a five-card poker hand and a two-card poker hand from seven cards that beat both of the bank's hands. The five-card hand's rank must exceed that of the two-card hand, and it is for this reason that the two-card hand is often called the "small", "minor", "low" or "2nd highest" hand whereas the five-card hand is "high" or "big." The two-card hand is also physically placed in front of the five-card hand, leading to the respective terms "front" (or "top") hand and "back" (or "bottom") hand.

== Deals ==
The cards are shuffled, and then dealt to the table in seven face-down piles of seven cards per pile. Four cards are unused regardless of the number of people playing.

Betting positions are assigned a number from 1 to 7, starting with whichever player is acting as banker that hand, and counting counter-clockwise around the table. A number from 1 to 7 is randomly chosen (either electronically or manually with dice), then the deal begins with the corresponding position and proceeds counter-clockwise. One common way of using dice to determine the dealer starting number is to roll three six-sided dice, and then count betting spots clockwise from the first position until the number on the dice is reached.

If a player is not sitting on a particular spot, the hand is still assigned, but then placed on the discard pile with the four unused cards. In some casinos, such as the Golden Nugget and Palms in Las Vegas, Nevada, an extra "dragon hand" is dealt if a seat is vacant. After all players have set their original hand they are asked in turn if they would like to place another bet to play the dragon hand. Generally the bet on the dragon hand can be the table minimum up to the amount the player bet on their original hand. The first player to accept the dragon hand receives it; this player is effectively playing two separate hands. Rules vary from casino to casino, but generally the dealer turns over the dragon hand and sets it using the house way. This is because the player has already seen the seven cards of their original hand, which could affect the way they would set the dragon hand.

== Hand rankings ==
The only two-card hands are one pair and high cards.

A 7-card hand worse than one pair (i.e., no flush, no straight, and no pair) is referred to as a Pai Gow.

Five-card hands use standard poker hand rankings with one exception: in most casinos, the "wheel" (the hand A-2-3-4-5) is the second-highest straight. At most casinos in California and Michigan this rule does not apply, and A-2-3-4-5 is the lowest possible straight.

The joker plays as a bug, that is, in the five-card hand it can be used to complete a straight or flush if possible; otherwise it is an ace. In the two-card hand it always plays as an ace, except in several southern Californian casinos where the joker is wild. This means that the highest possible hand is five aces, outranking straight flushes (including the royal flush).

== Win reckoning ==
If each of the player's hands beats each of the banker's corresponding hands, then the player wins the bet. If only one of the player's hands beats the banker then they push (tie), in which case neither they nor the banker win the bet. If both of the player's hands lose to the banker then the player loses.

On each hand, ties go to the banker (for example, if a player's five-card hand loses to the banker and their two-card hand ties the banker then the player loses); this gives the banker a small advantage. If the player fouls their hand, meaning that their two-card hand outranks their five-card hand, or that there are an incorrect number of cards in each hand, there will usually be a penalty: either re-arrangement of the hand according to house rules or, typically, forfeiture of the hand.

In casino-banked games, the banker is generally required to set their hand in a pre-specified manner, called the "house way", so that the dealer does not have to implement any strategy in order to beat the players. When a player is banking, they are free to set the hand however they choose; however, players have the option of "co-banking" with the house, and if this option is chosen then the player's hand must also be set in the house way.

California casinos typically charge a flat fee per hand (such as 5 cents or one dollar) to play, win or lose. Other casinos take a 5% commission out of the winnings, which is usually known as the rake.

== Variants ==
There are a number of variations of Pai Gow poker that are popular in casinos today. These variations were mainly formulated in 2004 through 2009. Pai Gow Mania was the first variation to be created which allows for two side bets instead of the traditional one side bet per hand. Fortune Pai Gow is another variation which allows players to make a side bet on a poker hand ranking of three-of-a-kind or better, one of the most popular variations. Similar is Emperors Challenge, which also allows a side bet on a seven-card pai gow (no hand). Shuffle Master introduced a variation of the game in 2006, adding a progressive jackpot side bet, named Progressive Fortune Pai Gow. Part or all of the jackpot may be won by placing a side bet and landing one of the hands specified on the payout table; a combined seven-card straight flush wins the entire jackpot.

A popular new variant that has spread from Las Vegas since the 2010s is "Face-Up" Pai Gow poker in which the dealer sets the hand without concealing to the players and before the players set their hand. There is no player banking. No commissions are collected in this variant. To offset the player advantage due to the face up cards, any dealer Ace high Pai Gow results in a table push. Since appearing at Circus Circus Las Vegas in 2018, it is estimated that at least 82% of games in Las Vegas have converted to face up by 2022. Because of no commission or player deliberation, the game is faster. This variant has a slightly lower house edge, at 1.8%.

== Advantage play ==
Advantage play refers to legal methods used to gain an advantage while gambling. In pai gow poker, a player may be able to gain an advantage in certain circumstances by banking as often as possible, taking advantage of unskilled players while banking, and dealer errors when not banking.

== History ==
Sam Torosian, owner of the Bell Card Club in Los Angeles, conceptualized the game of Pai Gow Poker in 1985. The idea for the game came to Torosian after being told about the game Pusoy by an elderly Filipino customer. He figured that the 13-card game with players arranging three hands would be too slow, but a simplified two-hand version with only seven cards would be faster and easier for players to learn. The game quickly became popular and by the late 1980s was being played on the Las Vegas Strip, and eventually worldwide. Torosian famously failed to patent the game he created after being given advice by noted poker author Mike Caro and an attorney he consulted, both of whom told him that the game was not patentable.

== See also ==
- Asia Poker
- Chinese poker
