= Chinese poker =

Chinese card game

Chinese Poker
- Origin: China
- Players: 2–4
- Cards: 52
- Deck: standard 52 card deck
- Rank (high→low): A K Q J 10 9 8 7 6 5 4 3 2
- Play: Clockwise
- Playing time: 2 – 5 min. per round
- Chance: High

Related games
- Pai gow poker Open-face Chinese poker Big two Poker

Chinese poker
- Traditional Chinese: 十三張
- Simplified Chinese: 十三张
- Literal meaning: thirteen cards
Transcriptions
Standard Mandarin
- Hanyu Pinyin: Shísān zhāng

Chinese poker is a card game based on poker hand rankings. It is intended as a beginner-friendly game, with only a basic knowledge of poker hand rankings needed to get started. The format allows for frequent unexpected outcomes due to the large element of luck involved, meaning a beginner has a good chance of winning in the short term against even experienced opponents.

== Gameplay ==
=== Playing ===
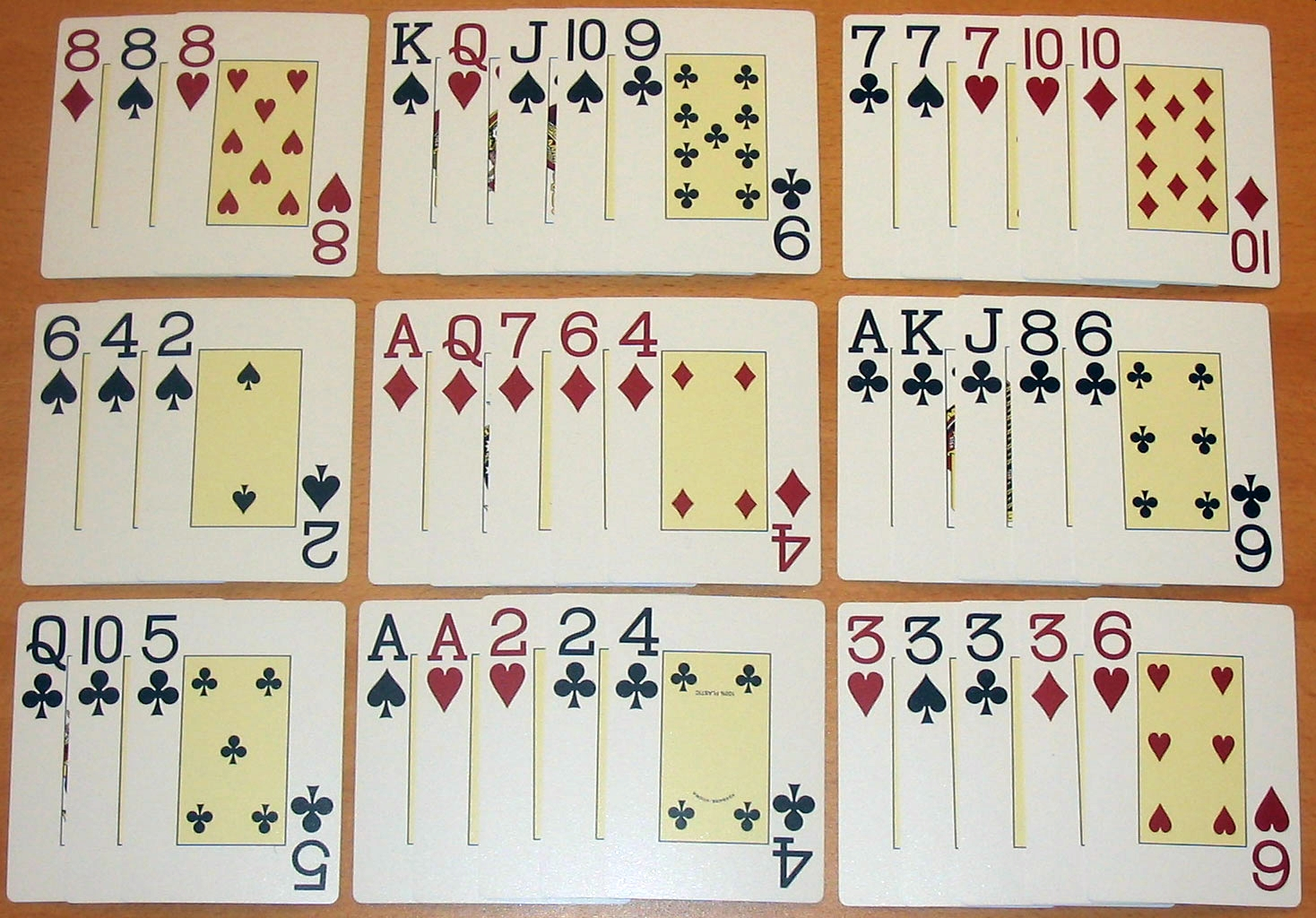
Chinese poker hands.

Chinese poker is typically played as a four-person game, though in rare occasions it can also be played with two or three. At the start of each match, a standard 52-card deck (excluding jokers) is shuffled and dealt 13 cards to each player. The cards are then arranged in a 3-5-5 format; the front (第一墩) consist of three cards, while the middle (第二墩) and the back (第三墩) consist of five cards each.

The rank of the poker hand combinations, alongside the rank of the cards (aces as high and two as deuces), also matter into the card arrangements; if any hand or cards are misplaced (倒水/相公), the player is subjected to a penalty. The arrangements must adhere to the following rules:

- The front hand can be either a single card, a pair, or a three-of-a-kind. Middle and back hands follow conventional poker combinations.
- The ranking order must arrange in such a way so that the card ranking on any level was higher than the total for the previous one, starting at the front hand and working toward the back (for example, if the front hand is a pair of eights, the middle hand must be higher than or equal to a pair of eights; the middle hand is a seven-high straight, so the back hand must be higher than or equal to a seven-high straight).
- In ranking, the rank for the triple (for three-of-a-kind or full house) or quad (four-of-a-kind), or by the highest card used in the straight or flush (including straight flush) determines the rank (A-2-3-4-5 is the lowest rank, up to A-K-Q-J-10 as the highest).
- J-Q-K-A-2, Q-K-A-2-3 and K-A-2-3-4 are not valid sequences. Moreover, straights cannot be formed for the front hand unless when forming a "three straights" natural hand (K-A-2 cannot be formed as a three-card straight).
- Suits do not matter. Furthermore, three cards of the same suit cannot form a flush in the front hand unless when forming a "three flushes" natural hand.

Once a hand is then arranged, the cards of each hand are revealed to other players, and are ranked based on the poker hand combination and the highest card used.

=== Scoring ===
The stakes played for in Chinese poker are known as points. Basic scoring rules dictate that a player collects one unit from each opponent whose front, middle or back hand is beaten by their own corresponding hand. Thus, unlike most poker games, getting best hands in some hands can also result in a win. Tie-breaking criteria determines the ranking of the players as follows:

- Based on the number of cards of the same rank for the front hand, or traditional poker combinations for the middle and back hands.
- Based on the highest rank of the card used for the combination, disregarding suits.
- If both of them have the same rank for the highest card for the following combinations, the player with a higher rank for the next corresponding card in ascending order takes priority. Three-of-a-kind, Straights, Full House, Four-of-a-kind or Straight flushes do not apply.
- If all else tied, the players in question are tied and are given the same placements.

The most common rules are 2-4 or 1-6 format, with one point per each winning hand, and additional points if they sweep. Some rulesets include a +3 and +1 point for the first and second-placed hands, respectively, with the fourth and third-placers paying that respective number of points. If multiple players tie, the sum of points for the placement in question may be averaged and are adjusted accordingly depending on placements.

Some hand combinations that placed on the front, middle or back can also be subjected to additional bonus points; these are called "royalty" hands. Three-of-a-kind for a front hand, Full House or better in the middle, or Four-of-a-kind or better in the back hand, are royalties.

Depending on ruleset, such as the Taiwanese version, losing all hands from one player will result in a "scoop" (打槍), doubling base points for that player in question; if one player beats all three player's hands, that player scores a "home-run" (全壘打), and their base points will double.

If the hand contains a special combination (such as three flushes or three straights, or 13 cards without a pair), the player has an option to declare the hand as a "natural" (例牌/特殊牌型); unlike regular scoring, opponents must pay an indicated amount of points to the player who played their natural hand. All natural hands are declared after the regular deck are revealed. Players who play their naturals cannot be scooped (and thus "home-run" is impossible).

=== Surrendering ===
If a player chooses to surrender their hand, they will pay an amount greater than the amount paid when losing at least two hands, but less than the amount paid when getting scooped. When surrendered, a player is not required to pay any royalties to their opponents. In some variations surrendering is not an option.

=== Example ===
	Amy	Bob	Winner
Front	6♠ 6♣ 4♥	A♥ K♦ Q♦	Amy
Middle	10♦ 10♠ 9♣ Q♠ 8♣	9♥ 9♦ 5♥ 5♦ 4♣	Bob
Back	3♥ 3♦ 3♠ 2♥ 2♦	K♠ J♠ 9♠ 8♠ 7♠	Amy

In the 2–4 method, Bob would pay Amy two units; Amy receives two points for winning front and back, loses one for losing middle and receives one as the overall unit for winning two out of three hands. In the 1–6 method, Bob would pay Amy one unit; again Amy receives two points for winning front and back and loses one for losing middle, but no bonus units would be awarded.

=== Royalties ===
Royalties, or bonuses as they are sometimes called, are extra units that may be awarded to players with particularly strong hands. Royalties must be declared prior to the revealing of the hands. While the royalty structure varies from game to game, the most common agreed-upon royalty structure is as follows:

Chinese poker royalties
Front hand		Middle hand		Back hand	
Hand	Base points	Hand	Base points	Hand	Base points
Three-of-a-kind (衝三; Chōngsān)	3	Full House (中墩葫蘆; Zhōngdūnhúlu)	1		
		Four-of-a-kind (中墩鐵支; Zhōngdūntiězhī)	3	Four-of-a-kind (尾墩鐵支; Wěidūntiězhī)	2
		Straight-flush (中墩同花順; Zhōngdūntónghuāshùn)	4	Straight-flush (尾墩同花順; Wěidūntónghuāshùn)	3

=== Naturals ===
Players can call a natural depending on the set of 13 cards that have been used; each natural hand must meet a certain criteria. If multiple players had called natural hands, the player with a higher rank wins, or drawn if tied. In some rules, players pay accordingly by the sum of the naturals played by them in question.

The following is a list of all the natural hands, their names in English and Chinese, their base point values, examples with dash indicating a set of cards, any hand overlaps, and any other valid criteria that come along with the hand, listed in order of base points. Those natural hands marked with ^ are uncommon hands but are included in other game variants of Chinese Poker.

Name	Chinese	Base points
Three Flushes	Sāntónghuā – 三同花, or Sānhuājùdǐng – 三花聚頂	3
- -
Contain three different group of flushes, with one group of three cards of a same suit, and group sets of five cards of another suit. Eight or 10 cards of the same suit counts as two flushes.
Three Straights	Sānshùnzi – 三順子, or Sānshéchūdòng – 三蛇出洞,	4
- -
Contains three different group of straights, with one group of three cards of a sequence, and two group of five cards of another sequence. Eight or 10 cards of sequential ranks counts as two straights.
Six-and-a-half pairs	Liùduìbàn – 六對半 or Wǔduìsāntiáo – 五對三条	6
- - - - - -
Contains six different pairs of cards. The pairs does not require to be unique, as a three-of-a-kind counts as one pair with a kicker, and four-of-a-kind counts as two pairs.
Four Triplets^	Sìtàosāntiáo – 四套三条 or Sāntàosāndàisì – 三套三带四	8
- - - -
Contains four groups of three-of-a-kind. The fourth group can also be a four-of-a-kind, which counts as a fourth set of three-of-a-kind with a kicker.
Full-Colored/Half-Flush^	Còuyīsè – 湊一色, or Hùnyīsè – 混一色	10
(Reds)
(Blacks)
All 13 cards that are colored entirely black (spades and clubs) or red (diamonds and hearts). Overlaps Three Flushes.
All Low2/Highs1^	Quánxiǎoquándà – 全小全大	12
(All Lows2)
(All Highs1)
All 13 cards with a rank value either higher than seven or lower than nine. Overlaps Three Straights and Full-colored.
Three Quads/The Bomb^	Sānfēntiānxià' – 三分天下, Sāntiězhī – 三鐵支, or Tiězhàdàn – 鐵炸弹	20
- - -
Contain three groups of Four-of-a-kind. Overlap Six-and-a-half pairs.
Three Straight Flushes^	Sāntónghuāshùn – 三同花順	24
- -
Contain three groups of Straight Flushes, with one group of three cards of a sequence of a same suit, and two sets of five-card straight flush. Eight or 10 cards of sequential ranks of the same suit counts as two straight flushes. Overlaps Three Flushes and Three Straights.
12 Royal Alphabets^	Shí'èrhuángzú – 十二皇族, or Zìyīsè – 字一色	32
- - -
All 13 cards are either aces or face cards. Overlaps Four Triplets, Three Quads and All Highs1.
Dragon/Full run	Yītiáolóng – 一條龍, or Záhuāyītiáolóng – 雜花一條龍	36
2 of spades 3 of clubs 4 of diamonds 5 of hearts 6 of spades 7 of hearts 8 of diamonds 9 of clubs 10 of spades Jack of clubs Queen of diamonds King of hearts Ace of spades
13 unique cards without any pairs or duplicates, and consists of one card of each rank, creating a full run from twos to aces. Overlap Three Straights.
Pure Dragon/Perfect full run	Zhìzūnqīnglóng – 至尊清龙, Tónghuāyītiáolóng – 同花一條龍, or Qīngyīsè – 清一色	108
2 of spades 3 of spades 4 of spades 5 of spades 6 of spades 7 of spades 8 of spades 9 of spades 10 of spades Jack of spades Queen of spades King of spades Ace of spades
A variant of the Dragon hand, but must be of a same suit. Overlap Three Straight Flushes.

== Current status ==
Chinese Poker was played at the 1995 and the 1996 World Series of Poker. In 1995, the $1,500 event was won by John Tsagaris, and the $5,000 event by Steve Zolotow. In 1996 the $1,500 event was won by Gregory Grivas, and the $5,000 event by Jim Feldhouse. There have been no Chinese Poker events at the World Series of Poker since 1996.

== Variations ==
=== Open-face Chinese poker ===
In this variation the players are dealt five cards in the beginning. These cards are arranged faceup on the table to the back, middle, and front hands. The cards cannot be rearranged later. Then the players receive a single card at a time for the remaining 8 cards. This means it is possible to make an illegal hand. This variation originates from Finland.

=== Other variations ===
- Low in the middle—In this variation, the middle hand is played as a deuce-to-seven low hand.
- Criss Cross—This variation is played heads up: each player is dealt two 13 card hands and plays each of their hands against each of their opponents' hands. Players' hands are to be treated as two independent hands; they cannot exchange cards between the two hands.
- In this variation, The Wheel (A, 2, 3, 4, 5) is the second highest straight. Therefore, it is ranked above a 9, 10, J, Q, K straight, but below a 10, J, Q, K, A straight.
- Another variation scores the game 1 point per hand, with the winner of the game being the first to 11 points. If a player wins all 3 hands and there are 4 players, the winning player gets a 4th point.
