= TonyBet =

International online gaming company

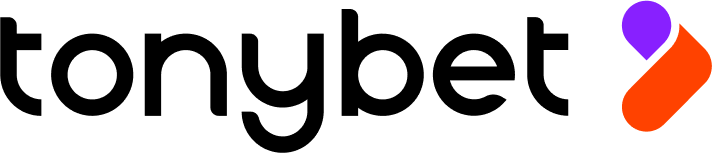
- Industry: Gaming
- Founded: 2009; 17 years ago
- Headquarters: Riga, Latvia
- Number of locations: 12 languages
- Area served: International
- Products: Sports betting, poker, casino, online casino,
- Website: tonybet.com

TonyBet is an international online gaming company offering sports betting, event betting, online casino, live casino, and poker products.

As of 2026, the company holds licenses in Spain, Canada (Kahnawà:ke and Ontario), the Netherlands, Ireland, Latvia, and Estonia.

== History ==
TonyBet was founded in 2009 by Lithuanian-Australian poker player and politician Antanas Guoga, who is also known by the nickname “Tony G”.

In 2011, TonyBet operated under UK and Estonian gaming licenses, allowing the company to provide services in the United Kingdom and Estonia.

In December 2013 TonyBet launched its own online Open Face Chinese Poker platform offering real-money games and tournaments. The following year, the company hosted the first Open Face Chinese Poker World Championship at the Prague Poker Festival

On September 8, 2016, Betsson acquired TonyBet's Lithuanian business for up to €6 million. The acquired operations were subsequently rebranded as Betsafe.

On November 3, 2022, TonyBet acquired an iGaming license in Estonia under the name of TonyBet OÜ and is no longer a part of Betsson Group.

In February 2025, the Dutch gambling regulator Kansspelautoriteit (KSA) issued a warning to TonyBet for not providing 24/7 customer support in Dutch, a requirement for licensed operators in the Netherlands. Following the warning, TonyBet expanded its Dutch-speaking customer support team and ensured round-the-clock customer service in compliance with regulatory requirements.

In March 2026, TonyBet joined the Canadian Gaming Association (CGA).

In May 2026, TonyBet was named Best Sports Betting Operator – Baltics at the HIPTHER Baltics & Nordics Gaming Awards, an annual iGaming industry awards programme covering the Baltic and Nordic regions.

== Products ==
TonyBet offers sports betting products, including pre-match and live betting, as well as betting markets on entertainment, political, and other live events, alongside online casino and live casino products.

In June 2021, TonyBet announced a platform and content partnership with Leander, adding new technology and gaming content to its online offering.

According to a 2025 review by The Irish Sun, the platform featured more than 3,000 games from over 60 content providers, including Evolution Gaming and Pragmatic Play.

In February 2026, TonyBet entered into a partnership with casino aggregation and technology provider St8 to expand its casino offering in Ontario through St8's content aggregation platform.

TonyBet also provides responsible gambling tools, including deposit and loss limits, self-exclusion, time-out options, and measures aimed at preventing underage gambling. A 2025 review by The Irish Sun also noted the operator's partnership with BeGambleAware and the availability of support resources for problem gambling.

== Licences ==
Since 2015, TonyBet has held licences in Spain.

Since 2021, TonyBet has been licensed in Canada in Kahnawà:ke, and since 2025 — in Ontario.

In November 2022, TonyBet obtained a license to operate in the Dutch market for 5 years and later joined Keurmerk Verantwoorde Affiliates (KVA) to align with local affiliate standards.

Since 2022, TonyBet has held a licence in Ireland.

As of 2026, the company holds licenses in Spain, Canada (Kahnawà:ke and Ontario), the Netherlands, Ireland, Latvia, and Estonia.

== Sponsorship ==
TonyBet controversially became a sponsor of the Lithuania men's national basketball team in 2010, controversially because TonyBet provides betting on basketball games and because in Lithuania gambling advertising is banned nationwide.

According to TonyBet, in 2013 it became the main sponsor for the team in a four-year deal, and also was sponsoring some of the leading basketball clubs of Lithuania and Estonia, an Estonian football club, and Lithuanian and Estonian volleyball associations.

TonyBet is one of the main sponsors of the Juta Racing team of the Porsche Carrera Cup GB. The company and the team signed a sponsorship deal before Juta Racing's debut season in the circuit in 2015.

In February 2024, TonyBet became the title sponsor of the Latvian Higher League under a three-year agreement, with the competition renamed the TonyBet Virslīga until the end of 2026.

In June 2024, TonyBet launched a Euro 2024 advertising campaign in Ireland featuring former footballer Tony Cascarino as the company’s brand ambassador. Cascarino continued to represent the brand in the company's Irish marketing campaigns through 2026.

In 2024 and 2025, TonyBet sponsored horse racing events at Leopardstown Racecourse in Ireland, including the Group 2 Solonaway Stakes during the Irish Champions Festival.

In May 2025, TonyBet became a supporter of the Latvia national football team under an agreement with the Latvian Football Federation, with the company’s branding to appear during national team matches and federation activities

As of 2026, TonyBet is listed as a sponsor of Estonian football club FC Nõmme United and Latvian football club FK RFS on the clubs’ official websites.
