= One player to a hand =

One player to a hand is an important poker rule, designed to promote fair play that is universally applied in casino play. It states that all game decisions about the play of each hand must be made by one player without any assistance. This means, for example, that a player may not ask for advice from any other players or observers during the play of the hand, nor should anyone offer such an advice. The phrase is often used as a warning to players making what might be perceived as minor violations, such as commenting upon other players' possible hands.

Note that any player correcting an error on a declared holding once the hands are exposed, is not a violation of this rule since no further decisions can be made. Some rulebooks declare it an ethical obligation of a player to point out any error in the awarding of a pot or the reading of hands shown down.

== Purpose and scope ==
The rule serves three main objectives:

- Preventing collusion and “rail coaching”. Outside advice gives an unfair edge and undermines the game’s individual nature.
- Maintaining competitive integrity. Decisions—betting, folding, reading hands—must reflect the player’s own skill and judgment.
- Avoiding information asymmetry. Unauthorised commentary may reveal hidden cards or strategic intent to some opponents but not others, compromising fairness.

== Practical application ==
- In‑hand conduct. Players may not seek hand‑reading help, ask for odds, or reveal their holdings to gain advice. Dealers routinely remind the table—one player to a hand, please—if conversation drifts toward strategy.
- Showdown exception. Once all remaining hands are tabled and no further betting decisions exist, any player or dealer may correct an error in reading exposed cards; at that point the restriction no longer applies, superseded by the “Cards speak” principle.

== Online poker ==
In Internet rooms the rule is built into software (no visible hole cards) but still applies to voice chat and screen‑sharing. Operators treat proven violations as collusion and may confiscate funds or suspend accounts.

== See also ==
- Cards speak
