= Bug (poker) =

Type of wild card in poker

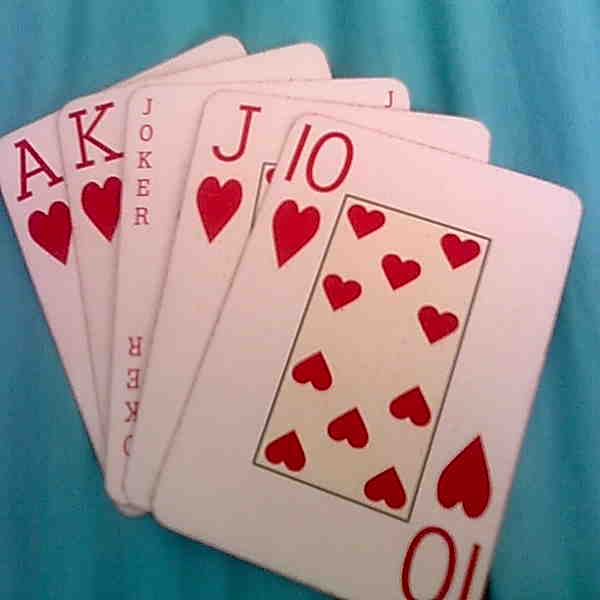
A royal flush with a bug as the queen of hearts

A bug in poker is a limited form of wild card. One or both jokers are often added to the deck and played as bugs.

In draw poker played for high and pai gow poker, the bug is considered to be an ace, unless it can be used as a missing card to complete a straight or a flush, in which case it becomes the highest card which can complete the hand.

- K♣ K♠ Jkr 5♥ 2♦ is a pair of kings with an ace kicker.
- A♦ A♣ Jkr 9♠ 4♥ is three aces.
- A♥ J♥ 8♥ 3♥ Jkr is a flush, ace-king high, the bug becoming the K♥, even if another player holds the "real" K♥.
- 7♦ 6♦ 5♦ 4♦ Jkr is an eight-high straight, the bug becoming an eight rather than a three since both complete the straight but the eight is higher.
- Jkr J♣ 10♣ 8♣ 7♣ is a straight flush, jack high, the bug becoming the 9♣.

In California lowball, the bug is the lowest unpaired card in a hand. For example, in 8-6-4-3 plus the bug, the bug becomes an ace; in A-2-3-5 plus the bug, the bug becomes a four.

Holding the bug greatly increases the power of certain drawing hands. For example, playing for high, a natural four-straight such as Q-J-10-9 drawing one has nine outs to complete the hand, any king or eight or the bug. By contrast, a four-straight including the bug can have as many as sixteen outs to complete the straight - Q-J-10-Joker can catch any ace, king, nine, or eight.
