= Baseball (poker) =

Variant of stud poker

Baseball is a variant of stud poker based on the American sport of the same name. Unlike traditional versions of poker, 3's, 4's and 9's hold special value because of their significance in the rules of baseball - three strikes, three outs, four balls, and nine innings.

== Rules ==
Play of the hand, including betting rounds, is the same as seven-card stud, with the added provisions that:

- Any 9 is wild.
- Any 3 dealt as a hole card is wild.
- Any 3 dealt in the open presents the recipient with a choice: they can either buy the 3 by matching the number of chips in the pot, in which case the 3 becomes wild; or they can consider themselves struck out and fold immediately.
- Any 4 dealt in the open results in that player receiving an additional hole card.

As poker author Irwin Steig noted, Baseball is a form of stud "scorned by purists and avoided by those whose tastes run to more peaceful games ... [it] is the choice of dealers who want sparkling action and big pots."

With a reasonably large number of players, it typically takes four of a kind or more to win a Baseball hand, and going for straights and flushes is usually futile. When Baseball is played high-low, perfect lows (equating to 6 4 3 2 A) become common, and anything less in that direction will likely lose.

== Variations ==
Any number of variations of Baseball are possible. Limits may be put on the cost of matching the pot. Or the buy-the-pot rule may only be in effect for the first person to receive an open 3; if bought, all open 3's received by anyone from that point on are wild with no further requirements. Or the pot-matching requirement can be omitted altogether and any open 3 is simply wild.

The extra card for getting a 4 can be dealt face up rather than face down. Another version of the game also makes face down 4's entitled to an additional card. There are variations as to when the player must announce they have a face down 4, and also whether the additional card should also be face down as a result. Still another variation on the face-down 4's requires the player to "buy" the additional card by putting an additional sum into the pot (often a multiple of the minimum bet). In this case, if the player declines to make the additional bet, they do not have to fold, but they do not get the additional card. And yet another flavor has an open 4 not getting an extra card, but rather a replacement for the 4 if the recipient so chooses.

If a card is mistakenly dealt before a player has made a decision about a 3 (or, in a variant, a 4), then such a card is considered out of play.

Football is an alternative version of Baseball Poker where 3's and 6's are wild and an additional card is drawn if a player is dealt a 2.

Woolworth is another variant, this time with 5's and 10's being wild, with an additional card awarded for players dealt a 2.

Blind Baseball is played the same as Baseball Poker, but with nine cards in total instead of seven.

Another variant is "Rainy Day Baseball." In this variant, if the Queen of Spades is dealt face-up to any player, then the game is "rained out." All cards are collected and the hand is re-dealt. The pot from the "rained out" game carries forward to the winner of the first hand that is not rained out.

== Sources ==
- Albert H. Morehead and Geoffrey Mott-Smith (eds.), Hoyle's Rules of Games (New York: Signet, 1958, 1963).
- Irwin Steig, Common Sense in Poker (New York: Cornerstone Library, 1963).
