= Mambo stud =

Tabletop casino game

Mambo stud is a casino table game based on 7-card stud. The game is considered a combination between stud and a widow game. Each player uses three cards in their hands plus one community card, played high-low. The players are dealt one downcard and one upcard, followed by a round of betting, one more upcard, one more round of betting, and then a community card, with a final round of betting. Players may use any combination of three of the four cards for high hand and any three for low. Hand rankings differ from standard poker. Low Mambo is the highest ranking low hand and consists of A-2-3. The highest ranking high hand called High Mambo, consists of Q-K-A suited. The remaining hand rank is straight flush, three of a kind, straight, flush, one pair, highest card rank. The low hand qualifier must be 6-high or better. A-2-4, and such hands are considered worse than Low Mambo. The entire pot goes to the high hand if there is no low.
