= Caribbean stud poker =

Casino table game

Caribbean stud poker, also called casino stud poker, is a casino table game with rules derived from five-card stud poker. However, unlike standard poker games, Caribbean stud poker is played against the house rather than against other players. There is no option to bluff or deceive as this is played against the house and not other players.

== History ==
As a result of the popularity of poker, casinos created house-banked games in order to entice poker fans to play more table games. The birth of the game is not well recorded, which is unusual for a relatively new game. Professional poker player David Sklansky has claimed that he invented the game in 1982 using the name “Casino Poker”. This early version had some differences, for example the dealer having two cards revealed instead of only one. Likewise, there was no progressive jackpot in the game he allegedly founded. Due to patent laws, Sklansky was allegedly unable to patent "Casino Poker". A few years afterwards he was approached by a poker player who brought the game to The King International Casino in Aruba (now known as the Excelsior Casino) and had it patented. The rules were shifted slightly to create current Caribbean stud poker.

== Rules ==
The following rules are typical of play in U.S. casinos, but some of the details, such as payouts and betting limits, vary by location.

To play, each player places their ante on a marked spot on the table playing surface ("the layout"); all ante wagers must be placed prior to the dealer announcing "no more bets". Each player also has the option to participate in the progressive jackpot feature of the game. This is also done before the dealer announces, "no more bets", usually in a separate marked area. Each player and the dealer will then receive five cards, face down. The dealer will turn over one of his cards, after which the players may look at their cards.

Players have the option to either play or fold. Any player choosing to play places their raise, an additional wager equal to twice the amount of the ante, into the box marked Bet. Any player who chooses to fold forfeits their ante. After all the players have made their decisions, the dealer reveals their four face down cards. The dealer only qualifies (plays) if his hand either contains both an ace and a king or forms a pair or any higher-ranked poker hand. The dealer then compares his five-card hand to those of the other players, individually, and both the ante and the raise bets of all players whose hands beat the dealer's qualified hand win. If they do not beat the dealer's hand, they lose both the ante and the raise wager. If a player ties with the dealer, both ante and raise bets push (return to their respective players with no additional money won). If the dealer's hand does not qualify, the ante bets of players get paid even money while the respective raise bets all push.

In the United Kingdom, the game is officially known as "Casino Five Card stud poker", and not all casinos have the jackpot prize. Those who do have the prize, usually the large chain groups, officially call the game "Casino Jackpot Five Card stud poker". In both instances, the game is commonly referred to as "Casino stud poker".

The basic rules are the same in the UK as the US, although the payouts differ – the maximum bet is generally £100 on the ante and £200 on the raise, and all payouts are paid on the raise, meaning the maximum payout can potentially be £10,000 (a Royal Flush pays at the same odds, 50:1, as a Straight Flush). If the dealer does not show an Ace/King, hands playing the jackpot must be turned over, face up, and shown to the dealer and table. If the player is not playing the jackpot prize, the cards are not shown.

=== Payout ===
If a player's cards beat the dealer's cards, that player will receive even money (1-to-1) on the ante, and the following on their bet (with a maximum payout of 5,000 U.S. Dollars per hand on each bet wager):

Combination	Payout
Royal Flush	100 to 1
Straight Flush	50 to 1
Four-of-a-Kind	20 to 1
Full House	7 to 1
Flush	5 to 1
Straight	4 to 1
Three-of-a-Kind	3 to 1
Two-Pair	2 to 1
One-Pair (or less)	1 to 1

Progressive jackpot payouts typically follow:

	US Payout	Macau Payout	AUS (Adelaide) Payout
Royal Flush	100% of Progressive Meter	100% of Progressive Meter	100% of Jackpot
Straight Flush	10% of Progressive Meter	10% of Progressive Meter	10% of Jackpot
Four-of-a-Kind	$500	$5000	$1250
Full House	$100	$1500	$375
Flush	$50	$1000	$250
