= List of poker variants =

The card game of poker has many variations, most of which were created in the United States in the mid-1800s through the early 1900s. The standard order of play applies to most of these games, but to fully specify a poker game requires details about which hand values are used, the number of betting rounds, and exactly what cards are dealt and what other actions are taken between rounds.

== Popular poker variants ==
The most popular poker variants can be divided into three broad groups:

- Draw poker: Games in which players are dealt a complete hand, hidden, and then improve it by replacing cards. The most common of these is five-card draw.
- Stud poker: Games in which each player receives a combination of face-up cards and face-down cards in multiple betting rounds. The most common of these are five-card stud and seven-card stud. These two variants are further played in other different formats.
- Community card poker: Games in which each player's incomplete hidden hand is combined with shared face-up cards. The most common of these are Texas hold 'em and Omaha hold 'em.

Some common rule variations include:

- Wild cards are added. This can range from adding jokers as wild card, to making certain low cards such as deuces wild to the 7-card stud variant named baseball.
- Lowball: The lowest hand wins the pot. There are different rules about whether or not aces count as low, and the effects of straights and flushes. The most common variants are Razz and 2-7 Triple Draw
- High-low split: the highest and lowest hands split the pot. Generally there is a qualifier for the low hand. For example, the low hand must have 5 cards with ranks of 8 or less. In most high-low games the usual rank of poker hands is observed, so that an unsuited broken straight (7-5-4-3-2) wins low (see Morehead, Official Rules of Card Games). In a variant, based on Lowball, where only the low hand wins, a straight or a flush does not matter for a low hand. So the best low hand is 5-4-3-2-A, suited or not.
- Players can pass cards to each other. An example of this would be Anaconda.
- Kill game: When a fixed-limit game is played and some condition triggers the stakes to double. A common version is if the same player wins two or more games in a row.
- A twist round in which players can buy another card from the deck. If a player does not like the purchased card, the player can purchase another one by adding money to the pot. This is sometimes called a "tittle."
- Roll your own: A variation added to stud poker which allows the player to determine which of his or her cards are turned up and visible to the other players.

=== Mixed poker games ===
Poker can be played in a mixed game format in which each variant will usually be played for a fixed number of hands or time and then the players will move on to the next game. There are many types of mixed poker games. The most notable mixed poker variation is HORSE poker, a mix of Texas hold 'em, Omaha high-low, razz, seven-card stud and seven-card stud eight-or-better.

== Specific poker variant games ==
Some poker games don't fit neatly into the above categories, and some have features of more than one of these categories. These variants are most often played in home games, usually as part of a dealer's choice format.

=== High Chicago or Low Chicago ===
Either of these two versions can be played in any stud high game. In High Chicago, or sometimes simply called Chicago, the player with the highest spade face down (referred to as in the hole) receives half the pot. In Low Chicago, the player with the lowest spade in the hole receives half of the pot, with the A♠ being the lowest. If the player with the highest hand also has the highest/lowest spade in the hole, then that player receives the entire pot - having won both sides of the bet.

=== Follow the Queen ===
This 7-card stud game uses a wild-card designated as whichever card is immediately dealt (exposed, or face-up) after any queen previously dealt (exposed). In the event that the final card dealt (exposed) is itself a queen, then all queens are wild. If no queens are dealt (exposed), then there are no wilds for that hand. Betting is the same as in normal 7-card stud games. Follow the Queen is a typical game variant in Dealer's Choice poker games.

=== Countdown ===
A variant of 5-card draw with four rounds of betting. After the first round of betting, each player may choose to replace up to three cards. A second round of betting follows and then players may opt to replace up to two cards. Upon completing another round of betting, each player may replace one card of the cards in their hand. After a final round of betting, any remaining players show their hands, and the highest 5 card hand wins. When players draw cards to replace ones in their hand, they add the cost of the cards in the pot. The cost of cards doubles each round. For example, if the dealer says each replacement card costs $10 in the first round, then each card costs $20 in the second round, and $40 in the final round.

=== Fargo ===
Fargo is a split pot game in which each player attempts to build the best 5 card Low or the best Flush (from 2 to 5 cards). The game always ends in a Declare of Best Flush or Best Low

=== Guts ===
Guts is a family of games that are cousins of poker rather than poker variants. They usually involve hands of 3 or fewer cards, ranked similarly to hands in poker, and multiple successive rounds of betting each of which consist of the decision to be "in" or "out", and each with its own showdown. The losers of rounds of guts generally match or double the pot, which grows rapidly.

=== Five-O poker ===
Five-O Poker is a heads-up poker variant in which both players must play five hands of five cards simultaneously. Four of the five cards in each hand are face-up. Once all five hands are down, there is a single round of betting. The winner is determined by matching each hand to the corresponding hand of the opponent. The player with the stronger poker hand in three (or more) out of the five columns, wins, unless a player folds on a bet that was made. If a player beats their opponent with all five hands, this is called a “Five-O” win.

=== Chinese poker ===
Chinese poker is a 2- to 4-player poker game with thirteen cards. The idea is to make three poker hands with increasing rank: two with five cards and one with three cards. If one of the hands does not adhere to increasing rank (i.e. is mis-set), the hand is declared dead and results in some sort of penalty.

=== Kuhn poker ===
Kuhn poker, using a three card deck, is more of a game theory problem than an actual game people play, but it can be played by two players.

=== AM's Regret ===
AM’s Regret is a poker variant created by Adarsh Mishra. It was derived from Omaha hold 'em in which players must redraw and irreversibly discard private cards after every betting round, making hands non-persistent and forcing continual strategic reassessment. It retains standard poker hand rankings and no-limit betting while shifting skill emphasis to decision-making under irreversible information loss rather than card accumulation.

== See also ==
- Non-standard poker hands
- Blind Man's Bluff
- Chicago (poker card game)
- Duplicate poker
- Strip poker
- Wall Street Poker
