= Excelsior Casino =

Coordinates: 12.575393°N 70.044197°W

- Interactive map of Excelsior Casino
- Location: 230 J.E. Irausquin Boulevard Palm Beach, Noord, Aruba
- Previous names: King Casino, Grand Holiday Casino
- Website: www.ExcelsiorCasino.com

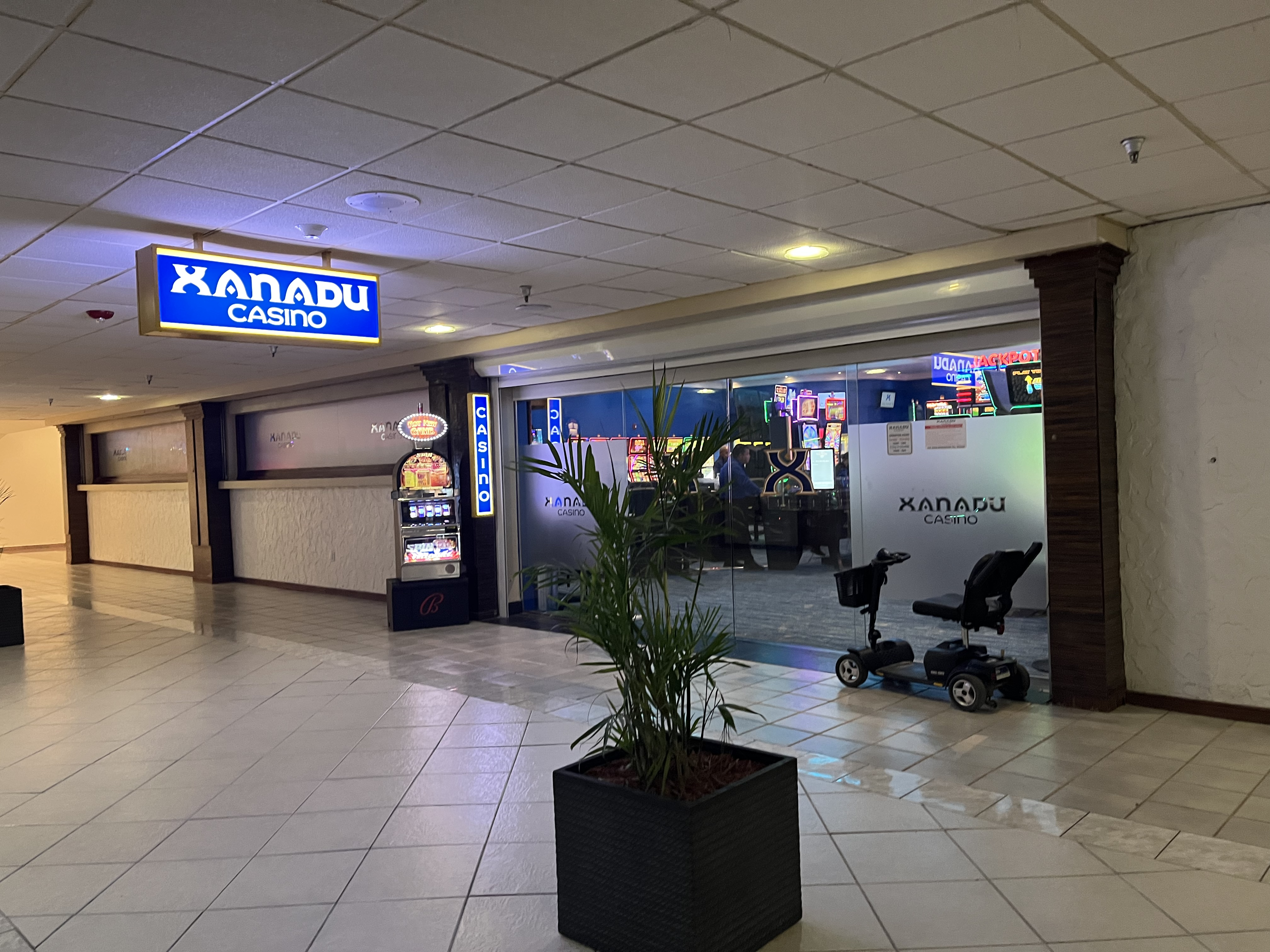
Xanadu Casino, which replaced the Excelsior Casino

Excelsior Casino was a casino located in Aruba as part of the Holiday Inn hotel. It was the first casino to open on the island. It originally was known as the King Casino, then become the Grand Holiday Casino before adopting its final name in 2000. It was known as the casino where Caribbean stud poker was invented.

It was also the only casino in Aruba to offer 3-4-5 times odds on Craps and Double Deck Blackjack. Due to the COVID-19 pandemic, the casino declared bankruptcy in 2021 and over 65 employees lost their jobs. It was replaced by the Xanadu Casino.
