= Michael Wiesenberg =

American technical writer, author, and poker player

Michael Wiesenberg is a technical writer, author, and former poker player.

== Career ==
Wiesenberg played poker professionally for 10 years before becoming a technical writer. He contributed for many years to the original Gambling Times magazine, writing about keno and poker. He had a biweekly column in the original Poker Player for five years and in Pan Player + for two (a defunct magazine for panguingue players). He had a monthly column for three years in Dr. Dobb's Journal, a computer magazine, and a monthly column for two years in A+, a magazine for Apple Computer users. He has contributed articles to PC Publishing, MicroTimes, Gambling Times, InfoWorld, Gaming & Wagering Business, Casino & Sports, and was an occasional contributor of articles to inCider, The San Jose Mercury, The San Francisco Chronicle, Science '84, and Desktop Publishing. He has also constructed crosswords for national crossword puzzle magazines and newspapers. His puzzles appeared monthly for five years in LA Direct, and seven years online at Poker Pages and Puzzle Planet, and has had puzzles in the New York Times. In 2011, he contributed a crossword puzzle to the Los Angeles Times that contained no instances of the letter E. He was also the editor for four years of two newsletters sent twice-monthly through Card Player's website and the content editor of the site.

He wrote the rules and games descriptions sections for online poker cardrooms Full Tilt Poker and Planet Poker.

== Publications ==
- Free Money: How to Win in the Cardrooms of California. Lyle Stuart. 1985. ISBN 978-0897460279.
- Puzzled Programmers. Microsoft Press. 1987. ISBN 978-0140872408.
- The Official Dictionary of Poker. Mike Caro University. 2000. ISBN 978-1880069523.
- The Ultimate Casino Guide. Sourcebooks, Inc. 2005. ISBN 978-1402203800.
- The Official Dictionary of Poker: Second Edition. Amazon. 2014. ASIN B00KJMP6B2.
- Canadian Crosswords. CreateSpace Independent Publishing Platform. 2018. ISBN 978-1985099791.
