= Stud poker =

Variants of the betting card game

Stud poker is any of a number of poker variants in which each player receives a number of face-down and face-up cards dealt in multiple betting rounds. Stud games are also typically non-positional games, meaning that the player who bets first on each round may change from round to round (it is usually the player whose face-up cards make the best hand for the game being played). The cards dealt face down to each individual player are called hole cards, which gave rise to the common English expression ace in the hole for any hidden advantage.

== History ==
Stud poker variants using four cards were popular as of the American Revolutionary War. Five-card stud first appeared during the American Civil War when the game was much played among soldiers on both sides, and became very popular. Later, seven-card stud became more common, both in casinos and in home games. These two games form the basis of most modern stud poker variations.

== Play ==
The number of betting rounds in a game influences how well the game plays with different betting structures. Games with four or fewer betting rounds, such as five-card stud and Mississippi stud, play well with any structure, and are especially well suited to no limit and pot limit play. Games with more betting rounds are more suited to fixed limit or spread limit. It is common (and recommended) for later betting rounds to have higher limits than earlier ones. For example, a "$5/$10 Seven-card Stud" game in a Nevada casino allows $5 bets for the first two rounds and $10 bets for subsequent rounds. Also common is to make the final round even higher: a "$5/$10/$20" game would allow $20 bets on the last round only. Another common rule is to allow the larger bet on the second round if there is an "open pair" (that is, at least one player's upcards make a pair). Some casinos (typically in California) use the smaller limit on the first three rounds rather than just the first two.

It is a common convention in stud poker to name the betting rounds after the number of cards each player holds when that betting round begins. So the bet that occurs when each player has three cards is called "third card" or "third street", while the bet that occurs when each player has five cards is "fifth street". The final round, regardless of the number of betting rounds, is commonly called the "river" or simply the "end".

== Specific variants ==
As mentioned above, seven-card stud is probably the most common form of the game, with most other games being variants of that, although five-card stud is also a basic pattern upon which many variations are built.

=== Six-card stud ===
Six-card stud is usually played as identical to seven-card stud, except that the last face-up round is removed (thus it is two down, three up, one down). With Flip, the last card is dealt face-down, but one of the face-down cards must be flipped face-up. Six-card stud can also be played as 1-4-1, where the first betting round occurs after only two cards are dealt (one down and one up). This latter form more closely resembles five-card stud with an extra downcard.

=== Razz ===
Razz is a variant where the lowest hand wins the pot instead of the highest. Versions differ in the rules for treating straights and flushes as high or low. London Lowball is a popular version that counts straights against the player.

=== High-low stud ===
High-low stud is played using high-low split betting, where the pot is split between the player with the highest hand and the player with the lowest hand. In the most common form, known as "eight-or-better" or "stud eight", an 8-high hand or lower is required to win low. If there is no qualifying low hand, high hand takes the entire pot.

Another form of high-low split stud is played under the same rules as stud eight, but there is no qualifier required for the low half of the pot. Often referred to as Q, it is much less common than stud eight, and is generally played at higher limits.

=== Mexican stud ===
Various forms of roll your own five-card stud, often with a stripped deck and wild cards, are called Mexican stud, Mexican poker, or stud loco. One such variant played by the Casino San Pablo in northern California has these rules: 8s, 9s, and 10s are stripped from the deck, and a single joker is added (the deck therefore contains 41 cards). The 7-spot and the J become consecutive, so that 5-6-7-J-Q is a straight. A flush beats a full house (with fewer ranks in the deck, full house is easier to get). The joker plays as a bug if it is face up, and fully wild if it is face down. The game is played as five-card stud choose-before roll your own. It is usually played with a very high ante, and the high card on the first round pays the bring-in.

The game of Shifting sands is Mexican stud in which each player's hole card (and all others of that rank) are wild for that player only.

=== Caribbean stud ===
Caribbean Stud Poker is a casino game that has been developed using the poker hands and general rules of 5 card stud poker. The game combines poker elements and standard table game elements in that each player dealt into the hand is playing against the dealer. Originally invented by gambling author David Sklansky using the name Casino Holdem with some slight rule variations, the game was first introduced at the Grand Holiday Casino and eventually all the remaining hotels in Aruba in the 1980s.

=== Miscellaneous ===
- Five-card stud played high-low split with an added twist round is called Option alley or five-card option.
- The game Scandinavian stud or Sökö is five-card stud with two new hand values added: Four-card flush and four-card straight. Hand ranking is therefore: High card, one pair, four-card straight, four-card flush, two pair and then on as usual. A four-card straightflush is not a hand in itself, it's merely counts as a four-card flush.
- The term English stud is used ambiguously to refer to several games, including six-card stud played 1-4-1 with a twist (also called six-card option), London lowball, and a seven-card stud game where both sixth street and seventh street are twist rounds.
- In the game of seven-card flip, each player is dealt four cards face down, and chooses two of them to turn up. All cards are turned up simultaneously after everyone has chosen. As this point, the game proceeds as if it were standard seven-card stud starting on fourth street.
- Kentrel, or "48", is a seven-card stud variation which starts with each player being dealt four downcards. Each player must then discard one, choose one of the remaining three to turn face up (leaving two down and one up as normal), and then proceed as with eight-or-better high-low stud.
- The game of Show Hand, which is not commonly played but made famous by Hong Kong gambling films, is a twist on 5 card stud. Players with the highest face up cards decide whether to check the round or raise; or, if the player with the highest face up card or hand checks, it will proceed to the next street. However, the last round of betting after the river is dealt is unlimited. In Show hand poker the last card is dealt face down. Players now choose from 1 of the 2 face down cards to reveal to other players. This variant is usually played with a set time-limit and bet limit to prevent players from taking advantage of checks and not betting to prolong the game.
- The game of Chicago is seven-card stud in which the high hand splits the pot with the player who has the highest-ranking spade "in the hole" (among his downcards). There is also Little Chicago (also called Southside), in which the lowest ranking spade in the hole splits the pot; players who play Little Chicago call the high spade variant Big Chicago. This also known as Chicago high by night and Chicago low by night. In Chicago by night the Deuces and One-eyed jacks are usually called as wild cards.
- The Bitch is a variant on Chicago above, played with a combination of up and down cards, usually two down, four up, and one down. The twist is that the Queen of Spades is designated as the highest ranking Spade, followed by the Ace, King, Jack, and so on. Also, if the Queen of Spades is ever dealt as an upcard to any player, all players turn in their cards, re-ante, and replay the game. This can lead to quickly increasing pots, especially if the re-ante amount is increased on each iteration. The high hand splits the pot with the high spade.
- Several different games played only in low-stakes home games are called Baseball, and generally involve many wild cards (often 3s and 9s), paying the pot for wild cards, being dealt an extra upcard upon receiving a 4, and many other ad hoc rules (for example, the appearance of the queen of spades is called a "rainout" and ends the hand, or that either red 7 dealt face-up is a rainout, but if one player has both red 7s in the hole, that outranks everything, even a 5 of a kind). These same rules can be applied to no peek, in which case the game is called "night baseball". See main article: Baseball Poker.
- Cowpie poker is played as seven-card stud until after the seventh-street bet. All remaining players then split their hands into a five-card hand and a two-card hand. The five-card hand must outrank the two-card hand, and the latter must contain at least one downcard. After the split there is one more betting round and showdown. Upon showdown, the highest five-card hand and the highest two-card hand split the pot. The name of the game is a pun on Pai Gow.
- Number Nine is a variant of seven-card stud in which 9s are wild, and any two number cards that add up to 9 may make one wild card, at the player's option. Aces count as 1 for wild card purposes. The player is not obliged to make any wild cards, and can play cards that could make 9s at face value or as wild cards, at his option. Cards used to make wild cards may not figure in the resulting hand twice. The player cannot add three or more cards. Sometimes, 9s themselves are not wild, and wild cards can be made only by addition.
- Dr Pepper is a stud variant where 10's, 2's, and 4's are wild (the name comes from one of the original Dr Pepper advertisements of the 1920s: "Drink a Bite to Eat at 10, 2, and 4 o'clock").
- Draft (or "socialist poker") is usually a variant of seven-card stud in which the second and subsequent upcard rounds are dealt this way: for each player remaining, one upcard is dealt to the center of the table (not to any specific player). The player with the worst showing hand gets to choose which of them he will take for his next upcard, then the player with the second-worst showing hand chooses his upcard from those left, and so on, until the player who previously had the best showing hand takes the remaining card. Then betting occurs as normal. In seven-card stud, this makes for three "draft" rounds (the first three cards are dealt normally, as is the final downcard).
- Auction is a similar variation in which each upcard round (or possibly just those after the first) begins with an "auction" phase. Instead of dealing each player one upcard, the first card is dealt to the center and all players bid on it; the player who bids the highest amount places that amount into the pot, and then has the right to either keep the auction card as his own upcard, or designate another player who is required to take it as his. After the first card is auctioned off and placed, the remaining players are dealt a random upcard as usual, and betting proceeds as usual. This variation is commonly played as high-low split, so it is common for a player to "purchase" a high card to force it upon an opponent seeking low, for example.
- Telesina is a stud variant which is played with a stripped "French" deck. The play follows most five card stud games except that after the fourth betting round a 6th community card called the vela card is placed in the center of the table. The vela card may be used by all players to improve their hand after which another round of betting occurs. The standard hand ranking applies with the slight difference in that a flush beats a full house because it is easier to get a full house than a flush. This is because instead of 13 cards per suit there are only 8 having the cards from 2-6 removed.
