= Cards speak =

Cards speak ("for themselves"), also known as "cards read" is used in two poker contexts:

First, it is used to describe a high-low split game without a declaration. That is, in a cards speak game, players all reveal their hands at the showdown, and whoever has the highest hand wins the high half of the pot and whoever has the lowest hand wins the low half.

The second is as a house rule in casino cardrooms. "Cards speak" means that any verbal declaration as to the content of a player’s hand is not binding. If Mary says she has no pair, but in fact she has a flush, her cards speak and her hand is viewed for its genuine value, that of a flush. Likewise if John says he has a flush, but in fact he does not, his hand is judged on its actual merits, not his verbal declaration. At the discretion of management, a player deemed to be deliberately miscalling his hand may incur a penalty.

The "cards speak" rule does not address the awarding of a pot, player responsibilities, or the similar one player to a hand rule. It merely means that verbal statements do not make a hand value, but the cards do.
