= Lowball (poker) =

Group of variations of poker

Lowball or low poker is a variant of poker in which the normal ranking of hands is inverted. Several variations of lowball poker exist, differing in whether aces are treated as high cards or low cards, and whether straights and flushes are used.

== Low-poker ranking ==
Lowball inverts the normal ranking of poker hands. There are three methods of ranking low hands, called ace-to-five low, deuce-to-seven low, and ace-to-six low. The 'ace-to-five' method is most common. A sub-variant within this category is 'high-low poker', in which the highest and lowest hands split the pot, with the highest hand taking any odd chips if the pot does not divide equally. Sometimes straights and flushes count in determining which hand is highest but not in determining which hand is lowest, being reckoned as a no-pair hand in the latter instance, so that a player with such a holding can win both ways and thus take the entire pot.

== Lowball variants ==
The most popular forms of lowball are ace-to-five lowball (also known as California lowball), and deuce-to-seven lowball (also known as Kansas City lowball). Ace-to-five lowball gets its name because the best hand at that form is 5-4-3-2-A. In ace-to-five lowball straights and flushes do not prevent a hand from being low. You win by simply having the five lowest cards. Deuce-to-seven lowball gets its name because the best hand at that form is 7-5-4-3-2 (not of the same suit).

=== Ace-to-five ===
Ace-to-five low is the most common method for evaluating low hands in poker, nearly universal in U.S. casinos, especially in high-low split games.

As in all low hand games, pairs count against the player. That is, any hand with no pair defeats any hand with a pair; one pair hands defeat two pair or three of a kind, etc. No-pair hands are compared starting with the highest-ranking card, just as in high poker, except that the high hand loses. In ace-to-five low, straights and flushes are ignored, and aces play as the lowest card.

For example, the hand 8-5-4-3-2 defeats 9-7-6-4-3, because eight-high is lower than nine-high. The hand 7-6-5-4-3 defeats both, because seven-high is lower still, even though it would be a straight if played for high. Aces are low, so 8-5-4-3-A defeats 8-5-4-3-2. Also, A-A-9-5-3 (a pair of aces) defeats 2-2-5-4-3 (a pair of deuces), but both of those would lose to any no-pair hand such as K-J-8-6-4. In the rare event that hands with pairs tie, kickers are used just as in high poker (but reversed): 3-3-6-4-2 defeats 3-3-6-5-A.

This is called ace-to-five low because the lowest (and therefore best) possible hand is 5-4-3-2-A, called a "wheel". The next best possible hand is 6-4-3-2-A, followed by 6-5-3-2-A, 6-5-4-2-A, 6-5-4-3-A, 6-5-4-3-2, 7-4-3-2-A, 7-5-3-2-A, etc.

When speaking, low hands are referred to by their highest-ranking card or cards. Any nine-high hand can be called "a nine", and is defeated by any "eight". Two cards are frequently used: the hand 8-6-5-4-2 can be called "an eight-six" and will defeat "an eight-seven" such as 8-7-5-4-A.

Another common notation is calling a particular low hand "smooth" or "rough". A smooth low hand is one where the remaining cards after the highest card are themselves very low; a rough low hand is one where the remaining cards are high. For instance, 8-7-6-3-A would be referred to as a "rough eight", but 8-4-3-2-A would be referred to as a "smooth eight". Some players refer to a hand containing a 4-3-2-A (in ace-to-five low or ace-to-six low) or a 5-4-3-2 (in deuce-to-seven low) as a "nut" (thus, in ace-to-five or ace-to-six, a 7-4-3-2-A would be called a "seven nut").

High-low split games with ace-to-five low are usually played cards speak, that is, without a declaration. Frequently a qualifier is required for low (typically 8-high or 9-high). Some hands (particularly small straights and flushes) may be both the low hand and the high hand, and are particularly powerful (or particularly dangerous if they are mediocre both ways). Winning both halves of the pot in a split-pot game is called "scooping" or "hogging" the pot. The perfect hand in such a game is called a "steel wheel", 5-4-3-2-A of one suit, which plays both as perfect low and a straight flush high. Note that it is possible—though unlikely—to have this hand and still lose money. If the pot has three players, and one other player has a mixed-suit wheel, and a third has better straight flush, the higher straight flush wins the high half of the pot, and the two wheels split the low half, hence the steel wheel wins only a quarter of a three-way pot.

Ace-to-five lowball, a five-card draw variant, is often played with a joker added to the deck. The joker plays as the lowest card not already present in the hand (in other words, it is a wild card): 7-5-4-Joker-A, for example, the joker plays as a 2. This can cause some interesting effects for high-low split games. Let's say that Alice has 6-5-4-3-2 (called a "straight six")--a reasonably good hand for both high and low. Burt has Joker-6-5-4-3. By applying the rule for wild cards in straights, Burt's joker plays as a 7 for high, giving him a seven-high straight to defeat Alice's six-high straight. For low, the joker plays as an ace—the lowest card not in Burt's hand—and his hand also defeats Alice for low, because his low hand is 6-5-4-3-A, lower than her straight six by one notch. Jokers are very powerful in high-low split games.

==== Wheel ====
A wheel or bicycle is the poker hand 5-4-3-2-A, regardless of suit, which is a five-high straight, the lowest-ranking of the straights.

In ace-to-five low poker, where aces are allowed to play as low and straights and flushes do not count against a hand's "low" status, this is the best possible hand. In high/low split games, it is both the best possible low hand and a competitive high hand. The best deuce-to-seven low hand, 7-5-4-3-2, is also sometimes called "the wheel".

=== Ace-to-six ===
Ace-to-six low is not as commonly used as the ace-to-five low method, but it is common among home games in the eastern region of the United States, some parts of the mid-west, and also common in the United Kingdom (it is the traditional ranking of London lowball, a stud poker variant).

As in all lowball games, pairs and trips are bad: that is, any hand with no pair defeats any hand with a pair; one pair hands defeat two pair or trips, etc. No-pair hands are compared starting with the highest-ranking card, just as in high poker, except that the high hand loses. In ace-to-six low, straights and flushes are accounted for (as compared to Ace-to-five) and count as high (and are therefore bad), and aces play as the lowest card.

For example, the hand 8-5-4-3-2 defeats 9-7-6-4-3, because eight-high is lower than nine-high. The hand 7-6-5-4-2 defeats both, because seven-high is lower still. The hand 7-6-5-4-3 would lose, because it is a straight. Aces are low, so 8-5-4-3-A defeats 8-5-4-3-2. Also, A-A-9-5-3 (a pair of aces) defeats 2-2-5-4-3 (a pair of deuces), but both of those would lose to any no-pair hand such as K-J-8-6-4. In the rare event that hands with pairs tie, kickers are used just as in high poker (but reversed): 3-3-6-4-2 defeats 3-3-6-5-A.

It is called ace-to-six low because the best possible hand is 6-4-3-2-A (also known as a Chicago Wheel or a 64), followed by 6-5-3-2-A, 6-5-4-2-A, 6-5-4-3-A, 7-4-3-2-A, 7-5-3-2-A, etc.

When speaking, low hands are referred to by their highest-ranking card or cards. Any nine-high hand can be called "a nine", and is defeated by any "eight". Two cards are frequently used: the hand 8-6-5-4-2 can be called "an eight-six" and will defeat "an eight-seven" such as 8-7-5-4-A.

A wild card plays as whatever rank would make the lowest hand. Thus, in 6-5-Joker-2-A, the joker plays as a 3, while in Joker-5-4-3-2 it would play as a 7 (an ace or six would make a straight).

High-low split games with ace-to-six low are usually played with a declaration.

=== Deuce-to-seven ===
Deuce-to-seven low is often called Kansas City lowball (the no-limit single-draw variation) or just "low poker". It is almost the direct opposite of standard poker: high hand loses. It is not as commonly used as the ace-to-five low method.

As in all lowball games, pairs and trips are bad: that is, any hand with no pair defeats any hand with a pair; one pair hands defeat two pair or trips, etc. No-pair hands are compared starting with the highest-ranking card, just as in high poker, except that the high hand loses. In deuce-to-seven low, straights and flushes count as high (and are therefore bad). Aces are always high (and therefore bad).

For example, the hand 8-5-4-3-2 defeats 9-7-6-4-3, because eight-high is lower than nine-high. The hand 7-6-5-4-2 defeats both, because seven-high is lower still. The hand 7-6-5-4-3 would lose, because it is a straight. Aces are high, so Q-8-5-4-3 defeats A-8-5-4-3. In the rare event that hands with pairs tie, kickers are used just as in high poker (but reversed): 3-3-6-4-2 defeats 3-3-6-5-2.

Since the ace always plays high, A-5-4-3-2 (also called the Nut Ace) is not considered a straight; is simply ace-high no pair (it would therefore lose to any king-high, but would defeat A-6-4-3-2).

The best possible hand is 7-5-4-3-2 (hence the name deuce-to-seven low), followed by 7-6-4-3-2, 7-6-5-3-2, 7-6-5-4-2, 8-5-4-3-2, 8-6-4-3-2, etc. Hands are sometimes referred to by their absolute rank, e.g. 7-5-4-3-2 (#1, said 'number one', see table).

| Hand | Name (#) | Other Name |
|---|---|---|
| 7-5-4-3-2 | #1 | Seven perfect, The nuts, Number one, The wheel |
| 7-6-4-3-2 | #2 | |
| 7-6-5-3-2 | #3 | |
| 7-6-5-4-2 | #4 | |
| 8-5-4-3-2 | #5 | Nut Eight, Eight perfect |
| 8-6-4-3-2 | #6 | |
| 8-6-5-3-2 | #7 | |
| 8-6-5-4-2 | #8 | |
| 8-6-5-4-3 | #9 | Rough eighty-six |
| 8-7-4-3-2 | #10 | Eighty-seven smooth |
| 8-7-5-3-2 | #11 | |
| 8-7-5-4-2 | #12 | Average eight |
| 8-7-5-4-3 | #13 | |
| 8-7-6-3-2 | #14 | |
| 8-7-6-4-2 | #15 | |
| 8-7-6-4-3 | #16 | |
| 8-7-6-5-2 | #17 | |
| 8-7-6-5-3 | #18 | Rough eighty-seven, The Dave P. |
| 9-5-4-3-2 | #19 | Nut Nine, Nine perfect |

When speaking, low hands are referred to by their highest-ranking card or cards. Any nine-high hand can be called "a nine", and is defeated by any "eight". Two cards are frequently used: the hand 8-6-5-4-2 can be called "an eight-six" and will defeat "an eight-seven" such as 8-7-5-4-2.

Another common notation is calling a particular low hand "smooth" or "rough". A smooth low hand is one where the remaining cards after the highest card are themselves very low; a rough low hand is one where the remaining cards are high. For instance, 8-7-6-4-2 would be referred to as a "rough eight", but 8-5-4-3-2 would be referred to as a "smooth eight".

Wild cards are rarely used in deuce-to-seven games, but if used they play as whatever rank would make the lowest hand. Thus, in 7-6-Joker-3-2, the joker plays as a 4, while in Joker-5-4-3-2 it would play as a 7 (a six would make a straight).

High-low split games with deuce-to-seven low are usually played with a declaration.

== See also ==
- Razz (poker)
