= High-low split =

Poker variation

In traditional poker games, the player with the best traditional hand wins the whole pot. Lowball variations award the pot to the lowest hand, by any of several methods (see Low hand (poker)). High-low split games are those in which the pot is divided between the player with the best traditional hand (called the high hand) and the player with the low hand.

There are two common methods for playing high-low split games, called declaration and cards speak. In a declaration game, each player declares (either verbally or using markers such as chips) whether he wishes to contest for the high hand or the low hand. The lowest hand among those who declared low wins that half of the pot, and the highest hand among those who declared high wins that half (for further details, see declaration). In a cards speak game, all players simply reveal their cards at showdown and the hands are evaluated by all players; high hand wins half of the pot and low hand wins the other half.

Especially when using the ace-to-five low method, it is possible for one player to have both the low hand and the high hand, and therefore win all of the pot (called "scooping," "hogging" the pot, or "going pig"). In the event more than one player ties for either high or low, the pot can be further split into quarters or smaller fractions. For example, if one player has the high hand on showdown, and two other players tie for the best low hand, the high hand wins half of the pot and each low hand wins only a quarter of the pot.

It is common, especially in cards speak games, to require a certain hand value or better to win the low half of the pot, called a qualifier. For example, in an "eight or better to qualify low" game, a player with a hand of eight-high or lower is entitled to win the low half of the pot (assuming his hand defeats all other low hands), but a player with a 10-high or 9-high hand cannot win, even if his hand is the lowest. In this case, the high hand wins the entire pot. There is generally no qualifier to win high, although one common variant is any pair/no pair, where a hand of at least a pair is required to win high and any hand with no pair is required to win low.

In high-low split games where each player is dealt more than five cards, each player chooses five of his cards to play as his high hand, and/or five of his cards to play as his low hand. The sets may overlap: for example, in seven-card stud played high-low split, a player dealt 7-7-6-4-4-3-2 can play a high hand of 7-7-4-4-6 (two pair, sevens and fours) and a low hand of 7-6-4-3-2 (seven-high).

== See also ==
- Omaha hold 'em
