= List of poker hands =

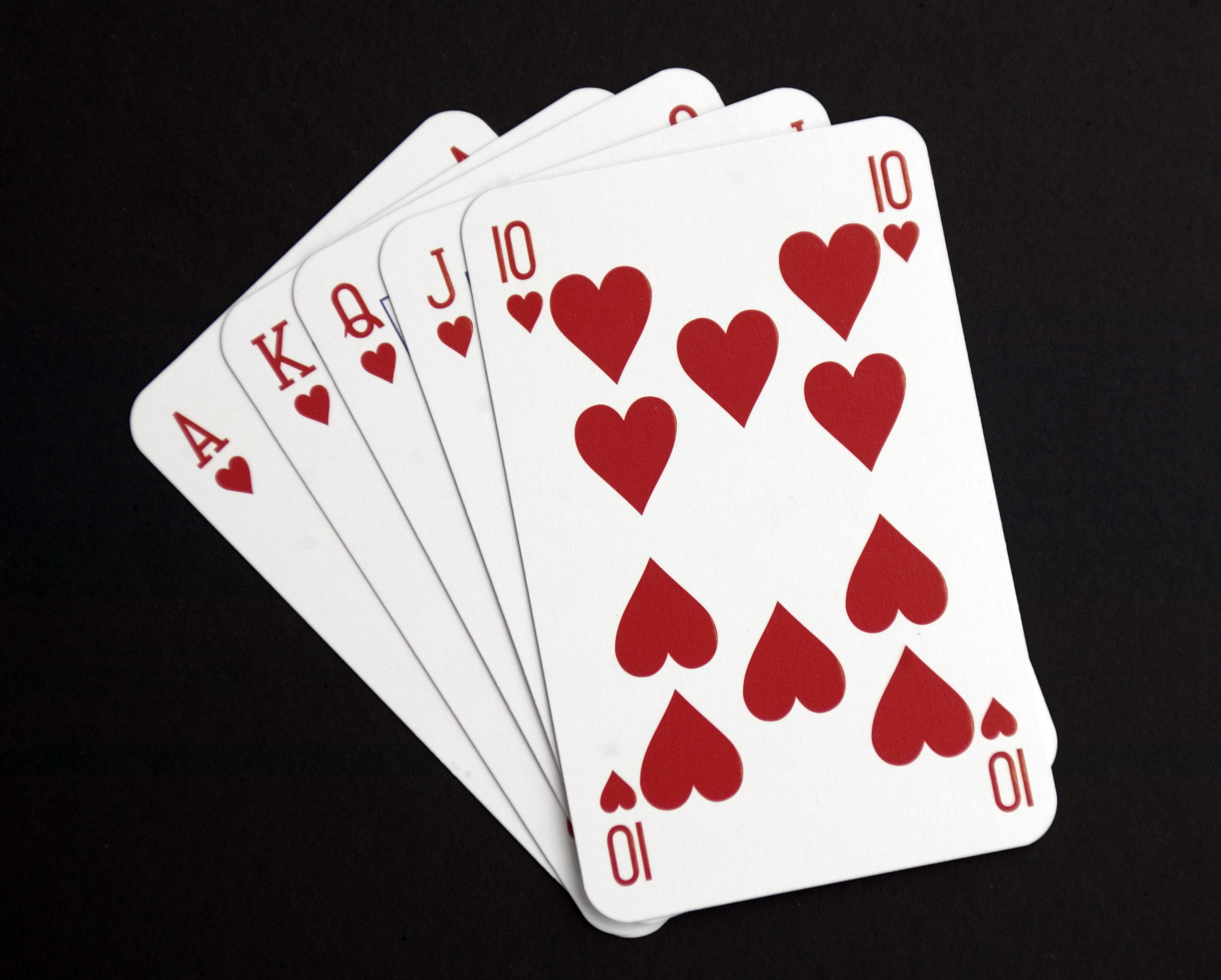
A royal flush is the best possible hand in many variants of poker.

In poker, players form sets of five playing cards, called hands, according to the rules of the game. Each hand has a rank, which is compared against the ranks of other hands participating in the showdown to decide who wins the pot. In high games, like Texas hold 'em and seven-card stud, the highest-ranking hands win. In low games, like razz, the lowest-ranking hands win. In high-low split games, both the highest-ranking and lowest-ranking hands win, though different rules are used to rank the high and low hands.

Each hand belongs to a category determined by the patterns formed by its cards. A hand in a higher-ranking category always ranks higher than a hand in a lower-ranking category. A hand is ranked within its category using the ranks of its cards. Individual cards are ranked, from highest to lowest: A, K, Q, J, 10, 9, 8, 7, 6, 5, 4, 3 and 2. However, aces have the lowest rank under ace-to-five low or ace-to-six low rules, or under high rules as part of a five-high straight or straight flush. Suits are not ranked, so hands that differ by suit alone are of equal rank.

There are nine categories of hand when using a standard 52-card deck, except under ace-to-five low rules where straights, flushes and straight flushes are not recognized. An additional category, five of a kind, exists when using one or more wild cards. The fewer hands a category contains, the higher its rank. There are
$$\begin{matrix}\frac{52!}{(52-5)!} = 311{,}875{,}200\end{matrix}$$
ways to deal five cards from the deck but only
$$\begin{matrix}\frac{52!}{(52-5)!5!} = 2{,}598{,}960 \end{matrix}$$
distinct hands, because the order in which cards are dealt or arranged in a hand does not matter. Moreover, since hands differing only by suit are of equal rank, there are only 7,462 distinct hand ranks.

== Hand-ranking categories ==
*	Only possible when using one or more wild cards
**	Category does not exist under ace-to-five low rules

Name	Example
Five of a kind*	Ace of spades Ace of clubs Ace of hearts Ace of diamonds Black Joker
Royal flush**	Ace of diamonds King of diamonds Queen of diamonds Jack of diamonds 10 of diamonds
Straight flush**	Jack of clubs 10 of clubs 9 of clubs 8 of clubs 7 of clubs
Four of a kind	5 of clubs 5 of diamonds 5 of hearts 5 of spades 2 of diamonds
Full house	6 of spades 6 of hearts 6 of diamonds King of clubs King of hearts
Flush**	Jack of diamonds 9 of diamonds 8 of diamonds 4 of diamonds 3 of diamonds
Straight**	10 of diamonds 9 of spades 8 of hearts 7 of diamonds 6 of clubs
Three of a kind	Queen of clubs Queen of spades Queen of hearts 9 of hearts 2 of spades
Two pair	Jack of hearts Jack of spades 3 of clubs 3 of spades 2 of hearts
One pair	10 of spades 10 of hearts 8 of spades 7 of hearts 4 of clubs
High card	King of diamonds Queen of diamonds 7 of spades 4 of spades 3 of hearts

=== Five of a kind ===
Five of a kind, aces

Five of a kind, or five cards, is a hand that contains five cards of one rank, such as 3♥ 3♦ 3♣ 3♠ 3 ("five of a kind, threes"). It ranks above a straight flush but is only possible when using one or more wild cards, as there are only four cards of each rank in the deck. Five of a kind, aces, A♥ A♦ A♣ A♠ Jkr, becomes possible when a joker is added to the deck as a bug, a form of wild card that may act as a fifth ace. Other wild card rules allow jokers or other designated cards to represent any card in the deck, making it possible to form five of a kind of any rank.

Each five of a kind is ranked by the rank of its quintuplet. For example, Q♠ Q♥ Q♣ Q♦ Q ranks higher than 6♣ 6♠ 6♦ 6♥ 6.

=== Royal flush ===
A royal flush

A royal flush or royal straight flush is a hand that contains an ace-high straight flush, such as A♦ K♦ Q♦ J♦ 10♦, and is the best possible hand in ace-high games when wild cards are not used.

=== Straight flush ===
A jack-high straight flush

A straight flush is a hand that contains five cards of sequential rank, all of the same suit, such as Q♥ J♥ 10♥ 9♥ 8♥ (a "queen-high straight flush"). It ranks below five of a kind and above four of a kind. Under high rules, an ace can rank either high (as in A♥ K♥ Q♥ J♥ 10♥, a royal flush) or low (as in 5♦ 4♦ 3♦ 2♦ A♦, a five-high straight flush), but cannot simultaneously rank both high and low (so Q♣ K♣ A♣ 2♣ 3♣ is an ace-high flush, but not a straight). Under deuce-to-seven low rules, an ace always ranks high (so 5♠ 4♠ 3♠ 2♠ A♠ is an ace-high flush). Under ace-to-six low rules, an ace always ranks low (so A♥ K♥ Q♥ J♥ 10♥ is a king-high flush). Under ace-to-five low rules, straight flushes are not possible (so 9♣ 8♣ 7♣ 6♣ 5♣ is a nine-high hand). A five-high straight flush, such as 5♥ 4♥ 3♥ 2♥ A♥, is called a steel wheel and is both the best low hand and usually the best high hand of the showdown in ace-to-five high-low split games.

Each straight flush is ranked by the rank of its highest-ranking card. For example, 10♣ 9♣ 8♣ 7♣ 6♣ ranks higher than 8♥ 7♥ 6♥ 5♥ 4♥, which ranks higher than 6♠ 5♠ 4♠ 3♠ 2♠. Straight flush hands that differ by suit alone, such as 7♦ 6♦ 5♦ 4♦ 3♦ and 7♠ 6♠ 5♠ 4♠ 3♠, are of equal rank.

=== Four of a kind ===
Four of a kind, fives

Four of a kind, also known as quads, four cards or bomb (in Dou dizhu), is a hand that contains four cards of one rank and one card of another rank (the kicker), such as 9♣ 9♠ 9♦ 9♥ J♥ ("four of a kind, nines" or "quad nines"). It ranks below a straight flush and above a full house.

Each four of a kind is ranked first by the rank of its quadruplet, and then by the rank of its kicker. For example, K♠ K♥ K♣ K♦ 3♥ ranks higher than 7♥ 7♦ 7♠ 7♣ Q♥, which ranks higher than 7♥ 7♦ 7♠ 7♣ 10♠. Four of a kind hands that differ by suit alone, such as 4♣ 4♠ 4♦ 4♥ 9♣ and 4♣ 4♠ 4♦ 4♥ 9♦, are of equal rank.

=== Full house ===
A full house, sixes over kings

A full house, also known as a full boat or a tight or a boat (and originally called a full hand), is a hand that contains three cards of one rank and two cards of another rank, such as 3♣ 3♠ 3♦ 6♣ 6♥ (a "full house, threes over sixes" or "threes full of sixes" or "threes full"). It ranks below four of a kind and above a flush.

Each full house is ranked first by the rank of its triplet, and then by the rank of its pair. For example, 8♠ 8♦ 8♥ 7♦ 7♣ ranks higher than 4♦ 4♠ 4♣ 9♦ 9♣, which ranks higher than 4♦ 4♠ 4♣ 5♣ 5♦. Full house hands that differ by suit alone, such as K♣ K♠ K♦ J♣ J♠ and K♣ K♥ K♦ J♣ J♥, are of equal rank.

=== Flush ===
A jack-high flush

A flush is a hand that contains five cards all of the same suit, not all of sequential rank, such as K♣ 10♣ 7♣ 6♣ 4♣ (a "king-high flush" or a "king-ten-high flush"). It ranks below a full house and above a straight. Under ace-to-five low rules, flushes are not possible (so J♥ 8♥ 4♥ 3♥ 2♥ is a jack-high hand).

Each flush is ranked first by the rank of its highest-ranking card, then by the rank of its second highest-ranking card, then by the rank of its third highest-ranking card, then by the rank of its fourth highest-ranking card, and finally by the rank of its lowest-ranking card. For example, K♦ J♦ 9♦ 6♦ 4♦ ranks higher than Q♣ J♣ 7♣ 6♣ 5♣, which ranks higher than J♥ 10♥ 9♥ 4♥ 2♥, which ranks higher than J♠ 10♠ 8♠ 6♠ 3♠, which ranks higher than J♥ 10♥ 8♥ 4♥ 3♥, which ranks higher than J♣ 10♣ 8♣ 4♣ 2♣. Flush hands that differ by suit alone, such as 10♦ 8♦ 7♦ 6♦ 5♦ and 10♠ 8♠ 7♠ 6♠ 5♠, are of equal rank. In Chinese Poker, a three-card flush does not exist and cannot be formed in the front hand. Under Big Two rules, flushes are rarely allowed in most rulesets, though the suit determines the priority and not the rank of the high card.

=== Straight ===
A ten-high straight

A straight, also known as a run, is a hand that contains five cards of sequential rank, not all of the same suit, such as 7♣ 6♠ 5♠ 4♥ 3♥ (a "seven-high straight"). It ranks below a flush and above three of a kind. Under high rules, an ace can rank either high (as in A♦ K♣ Q♣ J♦ 10♠, an ace-high straight) or low (as in 5♣ 4♦ 3♥ 2♥ A♠, a five-high straight), but cannot simultaneously rank both high and low (so Q♠ K♠ A♣ 2♥ 3♦ is an ace-high hand). Under deuce-to-seven low rules, an ace always ranks high (so 5♥ 4♠ 3♥ 2♣ A♦ is an ace-high hand). Under ace-to-six low rules, an ace always ranks low (so A♣ K♠ Q♠ J♦ 10♠ is a king-high hand). Under ace-to-five low rules, straights are not possible (so 10♥ 9♠ 8♣ 7♣ 6♦ is a ten-high hand).

Each straight is ranked by the rank of its highest-ranking card. For example, J♥ 10♥ 9♣ 8♠ 7♥ ranks higher than 10♠ 9♠ 8♣ 7♥ 6♠, which ranks higher than 6♣ 5♠ 4♥ 3♠ 2♦. Straight hands that differ by suit alone, such as 9♣ 8♣ 7♣ 6♦ 5♦ and 9♠ 8♠ 7♠ 6♥ 5♥, are of equal rank.

An ace-high straight, such as A♣ K♣ Q♦ J♠ 10♠, is called a Broadway straight, while a five-high straight, such as 5♠ 4♦ 3♦ 2♠ A♥, is called a baby straight, bicycle or wheel and is the best possible hand in ace-to-five low games (where it is a high card hand, not a straight). In Chinese Poker, a three-card straight does not exist and cannot be formed in the front hand. Under Big Two or Dou dizhu rules, as 2 is the highest rank and 3 is the lowest, the highest combination is instead a two-high straight (as in 2♦ 3♣ 4♣ 5♦ 6♠), with seven-high straight being the lowest, and in the former ruleset, the suit of the highest card determines priority.

=== Three of a kind ===
Three of a kind, queens

Three of a kind, also known as trips or a set, is a hand that contains three cards of one rank and two cards of two other ranks (the kickers), such as 2♦ 2♠ 2♣ K♠ 6♥ ("three of a kind, twos" or "trip twos" or a "set of twos"). It ranks below a straight and above two pair.

Each three of a kind is ranked first by the rank of its triplet, then by the rank of its highest-ranking kicker, and finally by the rank of its lowest-ranking kicker. For example, 6♥ 6♦ 6♠ Q♣ 4♠ ranks higher than 3♦ 3♠ 3♣ K♠ 2♠, which ranks higher than 3♦ 3♠ 3♣ J♣ 7♥, which ranks higher than 3♦ 3♠ 3♣ J♠ 5♦. Three of a kind hands that differ by suit alone, such as 9♠ 9♥ 9♦ 10♦ 8♥ and 9♣ 9♠ 9♥ 10♦ 8♦, are of equal rank.

In community card games, such as Texas hold 'em, three of a kind is called a set only when it comprises a pocket pair and a third card on the board. In Chinese Poker, three-of-a-kind is the highest rank for the front hand of a three-card combination.

=== Two pair ===
Two pair, eights and Aces

Two pair is a hand that contains two cards of one rank, two cards of another rank and one card of a third rank (the kicker), such as J♥ J♣ 4♣ 4♠ 9♥ ("two pair, jacks and fours" or "two pair, jacks over fours" or "jacks up"). It ranks below three of a kind and above one pair.

Each two pair is ranked first by the rank of its higher-ranking pair, then by the rank of its lower-ranking pair, and finally by the rank of its kicker. For example, 10♦ 10♠ 2♠ 2♣ K♣ ranks higher than 5♣ 5♠ 4♦ 4♥ 10♥, which ranks higher than 5♣ 5♠ 3♣ 3♦ Q♠, which ranks higher than 5♣ 5♠ 3♣ 3♦ J♠. Two pair hands that differ by suit alone, such as K♦ K♠ 7♦ 7♥ 8♥ and K♣ K♠ 7♣ 7♥ 8♣, are of equal rank.

=== One pair ===
One pair, tens

One pair, or simply a pair, is a hand that contains two cards of one rank and three cards of three other ranks (the kickers), such as 4♥ 4♠ K♠ 10♦ 5♠ ("one pair, fours" or a "pair of fours"). It ranks below two pair and above high card.

Each one pair is ranked first by the rank of its pair, then by the rank of its highest-ranking kicker, then by the rank of its second highest-ranking kicker, and finally by the rank of its lowest-ranking kicker. For example, 9♣ 9♦ Q♠ J♥ 5♥ ranks higher than 6♦ 6♥ K♠ 7♥ 4♣, which ranks higher than 6♦ 6♥ Q♥ J♠ 2♣, which ranks higher than 6♦ 6♥ Q♠ 8♣ 7♦, which ranks higher than 6♦ 6♥ Q♦ 8♥ 3♠. One-pair hands that differ by suit alone, such as 8♠ 8♦ 10♥ 6♣ 5♠ and 8♥ 8♣ 10♣ 6♠ 5♣, are of equal rank.

=== High card ===
High card, king

High card, also known as no pair or simply nothing, is a hand that does not fall into any other category, such as K♥ J♥ 8♣ 7♦ 4♠ ("high card, king" or "king-jack-high" or "king-high"). It ranks below one pair. Note that under ace-to-five low rules, straights, flushes and straight flushes are not possible, so such hands are instead high card hands.

Each high card hand is ranked first by the rank of its highest-ranking card, then by the rank of its second highest-ranking card, then by the rank of its third highest-ranking card, then by the rank of its fourth highest-ranking card, and finally by the rank of its lowest-ranking card. For example, K♠ 6♣ 5♥ 3♦ 2♣ ranks higher than Q♠ J♦ 6♣ 5♥ 3♣, which ranks higher than Q♠ 10♦ 8♣ 7♦ 4♠, which ranks higher than Q♥ 10♥ 7♣ 6♥ 4♠, which ranks higher than Q♣ 10♣ 7♦ 5♣ 4♦, which ranks higher than Q♥ 10♦ 7♠ 5♠ 2♥. High card hands that differ by suit alone, such as 10♣ 8♠ 7♠ 6♥ 4♦ and 10♦ 8♦ 7♠ 6♣ 4♣, are of equal rank.

Under deuce-to-seven low rules, a seven-five-high hand, such as 7♠ 5♣ 4♦ 3♦ 2♣, is the best possible hand. Under ace-to-six low rules, where aces have the lowest rank, a six-four-high hand, such as 6♣ 4♠ 3♥ 2♥ A♦, is the best possible hand. Under ace-to-five low rules, where aces have the lowest rank and straights, flushes and straight flushes are not possible, a five-high hand, such as 5♣ 4♠ 3♥ 2♥ A♦ or 5♠ 4♠ 3♠ 2♠ A♠, commonly known as a bicycle or wheel, is the best possible hand.

== See also ==
- Glossary of poker terms
- List of playing-card nicknames
- Non-standard poker hand
- Poker probability
- Yahtzee
