= Baduci =

Draw poker game

Baduci (also known as Badeucy or Badeucey) is a combination of Badugi poker and deuce to seven triple draw, and uses hand values similar to lowball. The pot in this game is split much like high-low split between the best Badugi hand (with aces playing high in Baduci) and the best 2-7 triple draw hand. The betting structure and overall play of the game is nearly identical to a standard poker game using blinds. A players' hand contains five cards, where only four cards are used to determine the best Badugi hand and five cards are used to determine the triple draw hand. During each of three drawing rounds, players can trade zero to five cards from their hands for new ones from the deck.

The exact origin of Baduci is unknown but the game is slowly becoming popular due to the growing success of Badugi poker being played in cardrooms around the world and online. In cardrooms, baduci is often played as part of a mix.

== Play of the hand ==
Play begins with each player being dealt five cards face down. Each player may observe those five cards he is dealt, but not the cards dealt to other players. The hand begins with a "pre-draw" betting round, beginning with the player to the left of the big blind (or the player to the left of the dealer, if no blinds are used) and continuing clockwise. Each player must either call the amount of the big blind (put in an amount equal to the big blind), fold (relinquish any claim to the pot), or raise (put in more money than anyone else, thus requiring others to do the same).

When all players have wagered the same amount of money into the pot or folded, play proceeds to the drawing rounds. Starting with the first player left of the dealer who is still playing the hand, players can then discard up to a maximum of three cards and "draw" an equal number of replacement cards. The discarded cards will no longer be used in play for the remainder of the hand.

After the first draw, a second round of betting is played. Players may check (not place any money into the pot, but still remains in play) until someone bets. This round of betting begins until everyone has placed an equal amount of money into the pot or has folded. After this round of betting ends, there is a second draw followed by a third betting round. Continuing, there is a third and final draw round followed by the fourth betting around, which is followed by a possible showdown.

If at any time all players but one have folded, the sole remaining player is automatically awarded the pot. If there is more than one player remaining at the conclusion of the final betting round, the hands of those players are compared and the player with the best badugi hand is awarded half the pot and the player with the best 2-7 hand is awarded the other half of the pot. This is known as the showdown.

== Hand evaluation ==
Two different hands must be evaluated at the same time. First a Badugi hand must be created by using a maximum of four out of the five dealt cards. This hand must have distinct ranks and suits. Any duplicates of a suit or rank are ignored and these cards become invalid. Any four-card Badugi hand will beat any three-card Badugi hand. A three-card Badugi hand will beat all two-card Badugi hands, which in turn will beat any one-card Badugi hand. In Baduci, the best possible Badugi hand is a five-high hand with four different suits, such as 2♠ 3♥ 4♣ 5♦. (Note that this differs from straight Badugi, in which game aces are low. For the purposes of Baduci, an ace plays as the highest card and loses to a king.) This hand is used to determine the winner of one half of the Baduci pot.

The other hand that must be evaluated is the 2-7 triple draw hand. Players use all 5 cards to determine this hand. Like Badugi, the triple draw hand increases in value as the card ranks are lower. The best 2-7 hand is 7-5-4-3-2, where the cards not all of a single suit. An example of the most powerful 2-7 triple draw hand is 2♣ 3♣ 4♣ 5♥ 7♣. Aces are always played high in 2-7. Note that 2♣ 3♠ 4♦ 5♥ 6♣ may seem like a lower hand, but this creates a straight and this is the reason why it is not the strongest hand. The best 2-7 triple draw hand would win the other half of the Baduci pot.

The objective of Baduci poker is to make the best two hands out of the five cards available in order to win both pots at the same time. This is known as "scooping" the pot.

== Betting structures ==
The most popular betting structure for Baduci poker is to use both fixed limit and two blinds. The limit for the first two rounds of betting is called a small bet, while the limit for the third and fourth betting rounds is called a big bet and is generally double the small bet. Other betting structures such as pot-limit, half-pot-limit, and no-limit can also be used but they are not as common.

== Strategy ==
Baduci shares many strategic similarities with other forms of draw poker and Badugi poker at the same time. The general strategy is to win both halves of the pot by making the lowest hand possible. An example of the most powerful hand in Baduci would be 2♣ 3♠ 4♦ 5♥ 7♣. This hand includes both the best Badugi hand and the best 2-7 hand, guaranteeing at least a tie for each half of the pot.

== Badacy ==
Badacy (a.k.a. Badacey) is a variant of this game. The only difference is in hand evaluation. In Badacy, the five-card low is evaluated using A-5 lowball rules, and for the Badugi, an ace plays as the lowest card, as in standard Badugi. Badacy and Badeucy were both offered as part of the $10,000 dealer's-choice championship at the 2022 World Series of Poker.
