= Badugi =

Draw poker variant

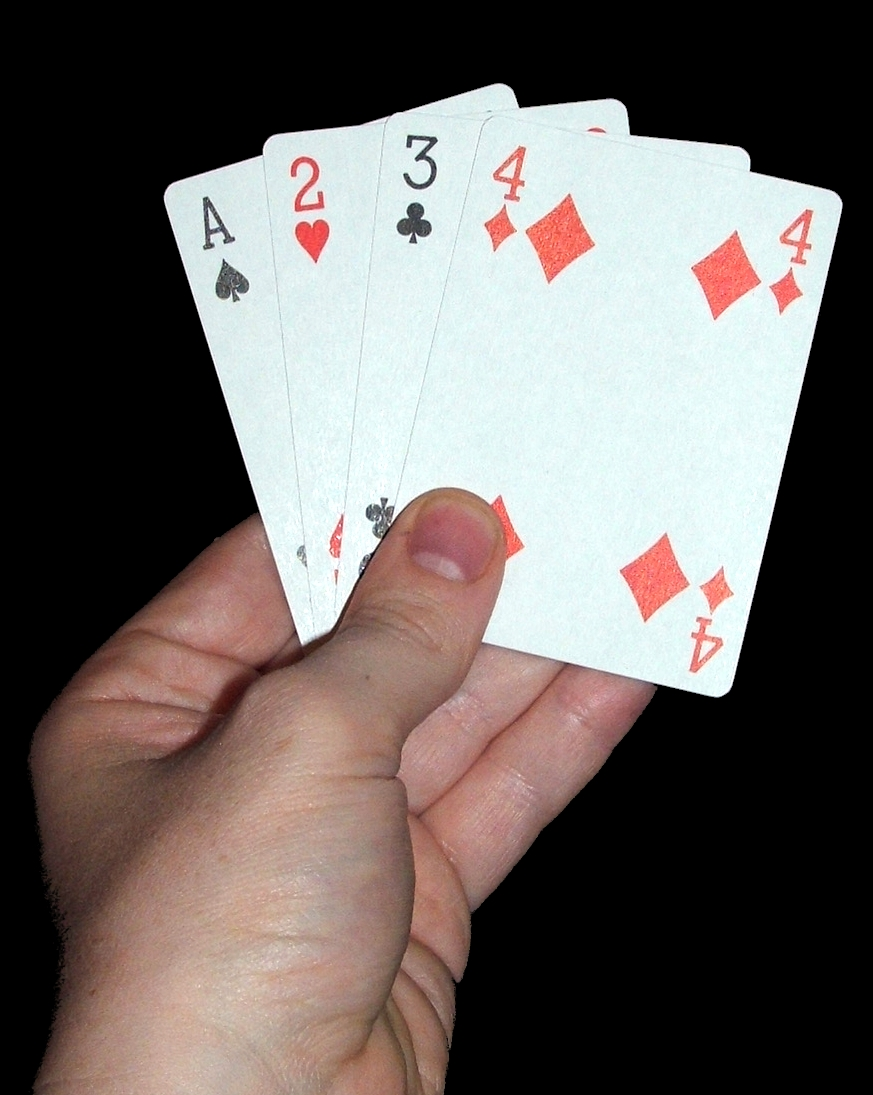
The best hand in Badugi, a four-high badugi.

Badugi (also known as badougi, paduki or padooki) is a draw poker variant that belongs to the lowball family of games. It is usually played six-handed, and uses a unique hand-ranking system where the goal is to make the lowest four-card hand with no pairs and no cards of the same suit.

Badugi features regular blinds and three drawing rounds during which players can exchange up to four cards to improve their holdings. Rounds of betting take place before the first draw and after each subsequent draw. The winner of the pot is either the player with the best hand at showdown, or the last remaining player in the hand.

Badugi is played in cardrooms worldwide, as well as on online platforms such as PokerStars.Since 2023, the WSOP has featured a $1,500 Badugi tournament, and it is also included in the WSOP Dealer's Choice and Triple Draw Mix events.

== Origin and Etymology ==
The exact origin of Badugi is uncertain, though the game has been played since at least the 1980s in South Korea, and is believed to have originated in Asia. Several sources credit Paul Clark with bringing the game to the US from Vietnam, where he played it whilst serving in the Vietnam War. The name 'Badugi' is derived from a Korean word that means "black and white spotted dog."

== Play of the hand ==
Following a shuffle of the cards, play begins with each player receiving four cards face down. The hand begins with a "pre-draw" betting round, starting with the player to the left of the big blind and continuing clockwise. Players may call the big blind, fold, or raise. If a raise is made then subsequent players must either match or raise the bet to remain in the hand.

The game then moves to the first draw phase. Starting with the player to the dealer's left and continuing clockwise, each player has the option to either discard and replace any number of cards from their hand, or to "stand pat" (draw no cards). If the deck is depleted during a draw, the discarded cards are reshuffled to form a new deck, enabling the draw to proceed.

The first draw is followed by a second betting round, then a second draw and a third betting round, followed by the final draw and betting round. If two or more players remain after that round then there is a showdown, and the pot is awarded to the player with the best hand.

== Hand evaluation ==
Cards are ranked from low to high, as in traditional lowball poker, with aces counted as low. Badugi differs from most poker variants in that hands are valued based on cards of distinct ranks and suits. If a hand contains cards that duplicate ranks or suits, only the best card plays. Four-card hands beat three-card hands, which beat two-card hands, which in turn beat one-card hands. A hand of four cards of distinct ranks and suits is called a "badugi." Among hands sharing the same high card, the hand with lower side-cards is stronger. If all cards are of equal rank, the hand is a tie.

The best possible hand is A234 of four different suits. The worst possible hand is K♣ K♦ K♥ K♠. In cases where the same four cards can be reduced into more than one qualifying hand (as in the final example below) the best possible reduction is used.

Examples of hand comparisons:

- 2♠ 4♣ 5♦ 6♥ beats A♠ 2♣ 3♦ 7♥ as both are badugis, but the 6♥ is lower than the 7♥.
- 4♠ 5♣ 6♦ K♥ beats 2♠ 3♠ 4♦ 7♥ because the first is a badugi and the second is a three-card hand (as it contains two spades, and therefore only the 2♠ 4♦ and 7♥ play).
- A♠ 5♦ 9♦ 9♥ beats A♣ 2♠ 2♣ J♦ because they reduce to the respective three-card hands A♠ 5♦ 9♥ and A♣ 2♠ J♦.
- 2♠ 3♠ 4♦ 7♥ beats 4♠ 5♠ 6♦ K♥ as both are three-card hands, but the highest in the first is the 7♥ while the highest in the second is the K♥.
- A♠ 2♣ 3♦ 3♠ and A♦ 2♥ 3♣ K♣ are of the same strength, since they both reduce to the three-card hand A23.
- 5♦ 7♣ K♣ K♥ beats 2♠ 3♦ K♠ K♦ as the first is a three-card hand (after disregarding the K♣) while the second is a two-card hand (both kings are disregarded due to suit duplication).

== Example hand ==
The blinds for this example hand

Blinds: Alice is the dealer. Bob, to her left, posts a small blind of $1, and Carol posts the big blind of $2.

First betting round: Alice deals four cards face down to each player, beginning with Bob and ending with herself. Ted folds, Alice calls the $2, Bob adds $1 to complete his $2 call, and Carol checks. The pot is $6.

First draw: Bob acts first and draws two. Carol also discards two, and Alice draws one.

Second betting round: Bob checks. Carol bets $2, and Alice and Bob both call. The pot is $12.

Second draw: Bob draws one. Carol stands pat, keeping all four cards. Alice draws one.

Third betting round: Bob checks. Carol bets $4. Alice raises to $8. Bob folds, and Carol calls the $4 raise. The pot is $28.

Third draw: Carol is now first to act and draws one. Alice stands pat.

Final betting round: Carol checks. Alice bets $4, and Carol calls.

Showdown: Alice shows 2♠ 4♣ 6♦ 9♥, a nine-high badugi. Carol shows 3♠ 5♦ 7♣ 8♥, an eight-high badugi that wins the pot.

== Betting structure ==
When played in casinos, Badugi most commonly uses a fixed limit betting structure and two blinds. The betting limit for the first two rounds is referred to as the small bet, while the limit for the third and fourth rounds is the big bet, typically set at twice the size of the small bet. The small blind is usually equal to half of the small bet, and the big blind is usually equal to the small bet.

Badugi can also be played with other betting structures, such as pot-limit, half-pot-limit, or no-limit.

== Strategy ==
The best starting hands in Badugi are "pat" (made) badugis of eight-high or better. The strongest hands after pat badugis are three-card hands containing low, unsuited cards such as A23x and A34x. If a player is dealt a three-card hand such as A♣ 2♠ 3♦ 3♥ the probability of making a badugi in three draws is about 51%. In a six-handed game, players in early position can open profitably any queen-badugi or better, as well as smooth three-card sixes, and some three-card sevens. Smooth hands contain lower cards with fewer gaps between them, and are always preferred as they have more playability and equity than hands with the same high card but higher side-cards.

Drawing to an 8-badugi or worse is generally considered poor strategy, especially early in the hand. Unimproved two-card draws are typically folded after the first draw, and weaker one-card draws are usually folded after the second draw, when the betting limits double. The best hand after the second draw is usually a large favorite to remain ahead.

Players generally avoid re-raising pre-draw when drawing two cards, as the information they are forced to give away when drawing outweighs any pre-draw fold equity. Conversely, premium pat badugis and strong one-card draws are regarded as suitable for re-raising, rather than being played as calls. Unlike in other lowball drawing games, strong three-card hands often win at showdown in Badugi. Consequently, starting hands such as A2xx are ahead of higher but more complete holdings, such as T84x.

An important strategic concept in Badugi is breakability, which refers to the smoothness of hands when replacing cards. For example, the hand A♠ 2♣ 8♦ K♦ can improve by discarding the king and drawing any card from a three to a seven, and can then discard the 8 in an attempt to further improve, whereas a hand like K♠ 7♣ 6♦ 5♦ cannot improve to the same degree. Similarly, if a player has a hand such as 10♠ 9♣ 8♦ 7♥ and believes they are behind then they should fold, as there is no way to meaningfully improve their hand. But if that player had a hand with better breakability such as 10♠ 5♣ 2♦ A♥, they could break the 10-badugi and draw to a 5-badugi. Hands with better breakability are therefore strategically stronger and more flexible than less breakable hands.

Position is an important factor in Badugi strategy. Players in later position gain more information about the strength of opponents’ hands by observing their actions, and those who act last are often able to bluff more effectively as a result. Bluffing in Badugi generally involves snowing, where players stand pat (draw no cards) to represent a strong hand while actually holding a weak one, with the hope of winning the pot later through betting. Weaker three-card hands are generally considered preferable for snowing than decent draws, because they relinquish less equity when turned into bluffs. Additionally, players see fewer cards in Badugi compared to other draw games, so effective bluffing depends more on drawing and betting patterns than knowledge of discarded cards and blockers.

Similarly to other draw poker variants, the number of “outs” available to an opponent drawing to improve is often used to estimate hand equity in Badugi. If a player holds a three-card hand and is drawing one card, there are ten possible cards that can complete a badugi—the cards of the missing suit that do not pair the ranks already held. Players with a made badugi can use this information to estimate equities. For example, a player with an A♠ 2♣ 3♦ 8♥ badugi, facing an opponent drawing one card, knows that the opponent has at most four outs to improve to a better hand than their own, which means the player is at least a 91% favourite to remain ahead.
