= Button (poker) =

Marker used to signal the dealer or last player in poker

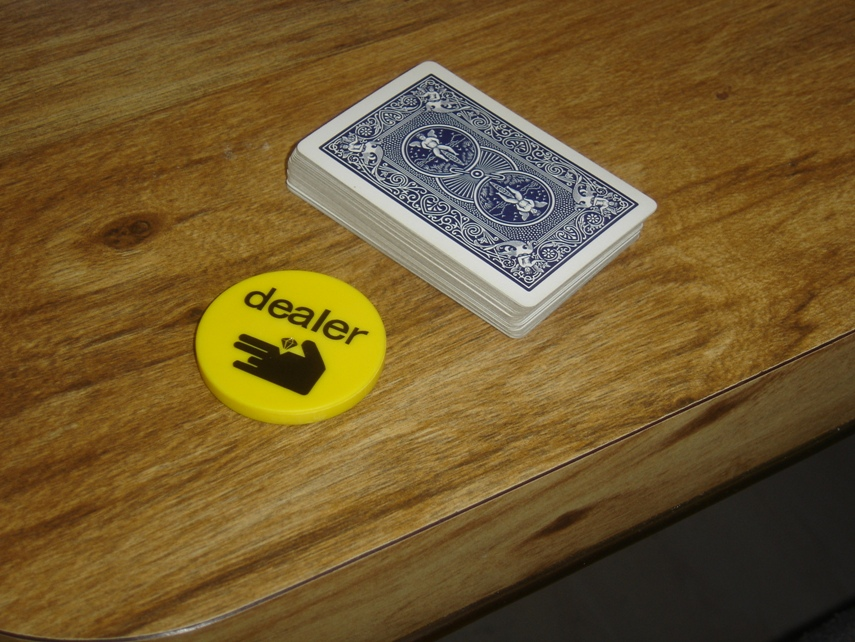
Dealer button and playing cards

In poker, the buck or dealer button is a marker used to indicate the player who is dealing or, in casino games with a house dealer, the player who acts last on that deal (who would be the dealer in a home game). The term button is also used for a variety of plastic discs, or lammers, used by casinos to mark the status of players.

== History ==
When poker became a popular saloon game in the United States in the middle of the nineteenth century, the integrity of the players was unreliable and the honor codes that had regulated gambling for centuries became inadequate. Because the dealer has the greatest opportunity to cheat (by manipulating the specific cards that players receive, or by inspecting the dealt cards), the players would take turns in this role. To avoid arguments about whose turn it was to deal, the person who was next due to deal would be given a marker. This marker was moved clockwise around the table after each hand. A knife was commonly used as a marker, and the marker became generally known as a "buck", as an abbreviated reference to the buck's horn that formed the handle of many knives at that time.

When the dealer had finished dealing the cards he "passed the buck". According to Martin, the earliest use of the phrase in print is in the July 1865 edition of Weekly New Mexican: "They draw at the commissary, and at poker after they have passed the buck." The phrase then appears frequently in many sources so it probably originated at about this time. However, Mark Twain cited it as common slang in Virginia City when he was a reporter there in 1862.

"Passing the buck" soon became a metaphor for dodging responsibility. U.S. President Harry S. Truman was noted for a sign in his office reading "The buck stops here." It was a gift from Fred Canfil, who found a similar sign in the warden's office at the Federal Reformatory at El Reno, Oklahoma.

The use of other small disks as such markers led to the alternative term "button". Silver dollars were later used as markers and it has been suggested that this is the origin of "buck" as a slang term for "dollar", though by no means is there universal agreement on this subject. The marker is also referred to as "the hat". The origin of this term is believed to stem from the wearing of a hat having been used to denote dealership.

== Dealer button ==
Today, a dealer button is typically a white plastic disc with the word "Dealer" on each side. While in most home games, the player holding the dealer button deals the cards, in a casino or cardroom, an employee handles this responsibility.

The dealer button is sometimes modified to indicate a secondary detail about the hand being played—for example, a kill game may use a button with the word "Kill" on one side to show that the current hand is a kill pot, and turn the "Dealer" side up to show that the kill is off, or a dealer's choice game might replace the dealer button with a placard indicating the chosen game.

The term "button" is often used to refer to the dealer position, which is the position whose turn to bet comes last. Being "on the button" is therefore the most advantageous and most profitable position in poker.

== Other buttons ==
In casino and card room cash games, the dealer's well may contain an assortment of laminated discs that the dealer may place in front of a player's seat under certain conditions. Properly called lammers (rhymes with 'spammers'), but also referred to as buttons, they are separate from and used differently from a dealer button.

The following table lists the most common lammers and their significance:

Button	Use
All In	Put in front of a player who has wagered all their chips.
Blind, Small Blind with Big Blind	Put in front of the players to show they owe the indicated amounts. The blind button is used in single blind games, while the big and small blind are used together in double blind games.
Missed Blind, Missed Big Blind, Missed Small Blind	Used to mark the position of a player who has missed their turn to pay a blind. When the player returns, the missed blinds may be paid immediately, or the player may keep the lammer and wait to play until the unpaid blind comes in turn. Which indicative lammer is used depends on the game being played or which blinds are missed.
No Player or Absent	Placed on the table at the position of a player that has been away for an extended period. According to World Series of Poker Live Action Rules, after the seat has missed the blinds, each new dealer places an additional lammer in front of the missing player's empty seat. On receiving a third lammer, the absent players chips' could be picked up by the house in order to seat a player waiting to get in the game.
Reserved	Put in front of an empty seat to hold it for a player that is arriving soon.
Seat Change	A player can request one of these lammers from the dealer and reserve first choice to change seats when a player at the table leaves the game.
Third Man Walking	Marks the position of a player who leaves the table when two players are already away. According to World Series of Poker Live Action Rules, the third player's chips' could be picked up by the house to seat a new player if the third player has not returned when the blind comes to their position.
Kill/No Kill or Kill/Leg Up	Used exclusively in kill games, these lammers are unique since they read differently on each side to indicate the kill status of the pot, similar to the "On/Off" point marker in Craps. If the kill is active, it is placed "Kill" side up in front of the player who has triggered it to show that player is required to "kill the pot" by posting an increased additional blind for the subsequent hand; Unless the player is also in a regular blind position, which would require only the increased value "kill" blind. If it is not a kill pot, the "No Kill" side is kept up by the dealer. The lammer may also read "Kill" and "Leg Up" on each side to show who has triggered the first half of a requirement to kill the pot ("Leg Up"), or if the pot has been killed. Which of the two differently marked lammers is used depends upon the requirement to trigger the kill pot for that game.

== See also ==
- Poker jargon
