= Heads-up poker =

Type of poker game

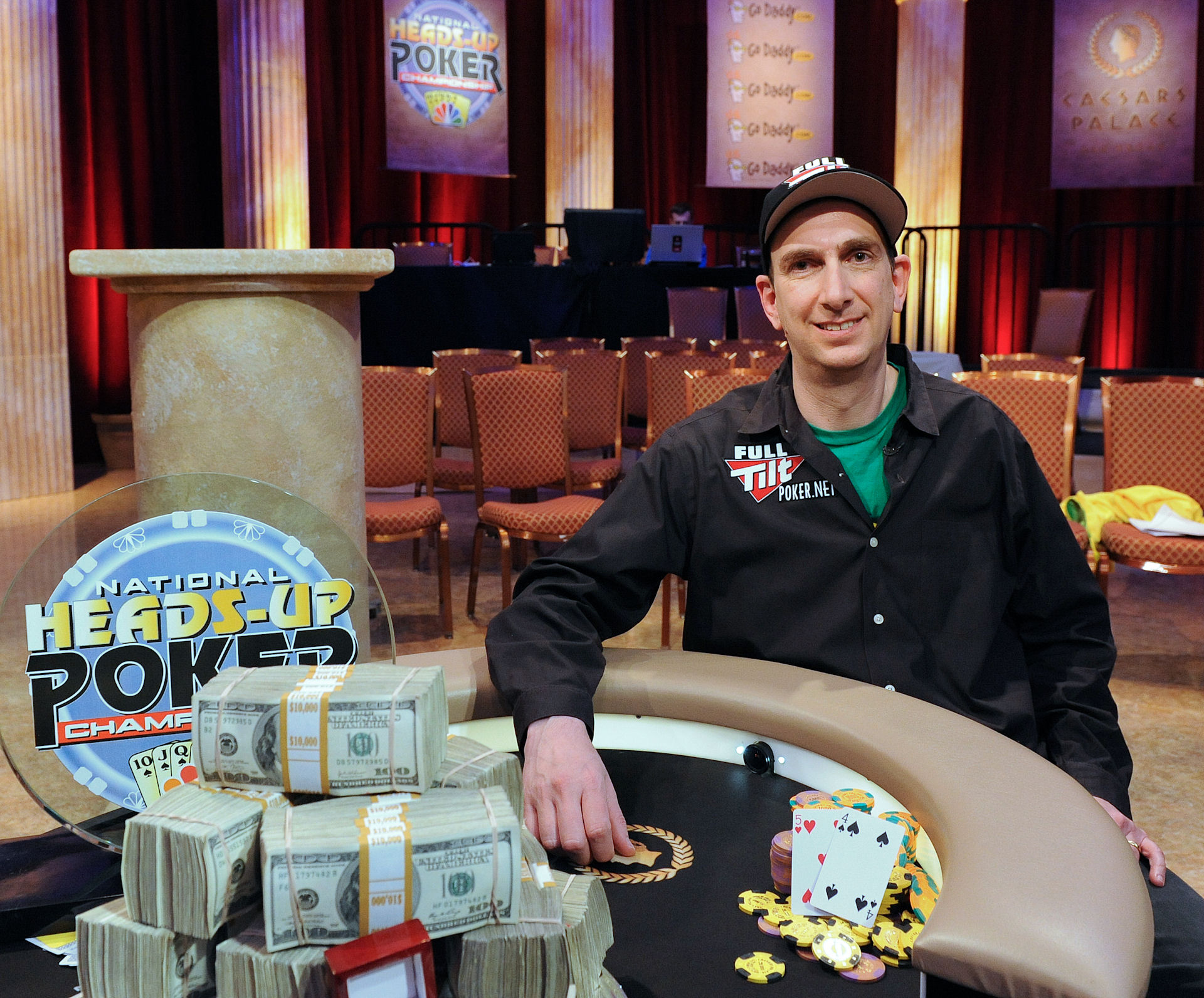
Erik Seidel 2011 NBC National Heads-Up Poker Champion

Heads-up poker is a form of poker that is played between only two players. It might be played during a larger cash game session, where the game is breaking up and only two players remain on the table, or where two players are trying to start a game and playing heads-up while waiting for other opponents. It is also a necessary phase in most sit-and-go (SNG) poker tournaments; the single remaining tournament winner will at some point have to face only a single opponent. Alternatively, heads-up poker may be played on purpose, either in a cash game format, or as a SNG, where two players play a winner-take-all tournament for a fixed, previously agreed upon amount of money. On larger online poker rooms and during certain tournament series, one may stumble upon larger heads-up tournaments, usually in the shoot-out format. Usually, in order to ensure the fairness of the game, all players finishing at the same level of the tournament bracket will be paid out the same amount of money, no matter what their finishing place is.

== Strategy ==
The rules of heads-up poker are the same as in a game with three or more players, except in community card poker, the blinds are usually reversed in order to decrease the positional advantage in matches between two players of similar skill. Nevertheless, the strategy employed tends to be vastly different from a multi-handed poker game. Since only two players take part in the hand, the chance of having the best hand is much higher than in a multi-handed game, which causes the game to become more aggressive than normal. Bluffs for example become easier to pull off in a heads-up game since it is only necessary to bluff a single opponent in order to win the pot, whereas in a multi-handed game there is a greater risk of someone having a big hand that cannot be bluffed.

The heads-up limit Texas hold'em variation has been claimed to be "essentially weakly solved" in January 2015 by the Cepheus poker-playing bot.

== Tournaments ==
In poker tournaments heads-up poker is played as individual events and there are also heads-up championships. Heads-up poker tournaments are typically played as knock-out tournaments. An example of a heads-up tournament is the National Heads-Up Poker Championship.
