= Kill game =

Type of game in poker

In the game of poker, a kill game is a game played using a variation of fixed limit betting rules. A kill game provides for the play of kill hands, which involve an extra blind bet and increased betting limits. Kill games are infrequent but not uncommon in home poker games; many casinos offering poker will introduce the kill to a table on request or during certain scheduled times. Kills are most often used in community card poker variants like Texas hold 'em, which normally use blinds as the primary forced bet, and this article assumes such a game is being played, but the concept can be made to work with almost any poker variant with only minor changes to suit the betting protocol of the game.

== Purpose ==
Kill games serve to mitigate wins by "dumb luck" or "flukes". They also serve to mitigate "bad beats", which are wins by a player who made questionable choices from an odds standpoint. While such players are often inexperienced, they may win a substantial hand despite making poor decisions (such as raising or calling on a drawing hand with very low probability to make the hand), which can be frustrating to more experienced players. Such poor decisions are likely to eventually or gradually result in a large loss; kill hands make this loss happen sooner rather than later if the player persists in "loose" play. Thus, kill hands encourage a more disciplined, "tighter" betting style (less likely to call/raise and more likely to fold). However, as the kill hands are only played infrequently, the general betting style of the table is looser than if the kill stakes were normal limits.

Kill games among a table of more experienced players also create a heightened thrill of risk; a player is on a winning streak, or a big pot has just been won, and the next pot is likely to be bigger. Kill games can in such cases encourage looser play as well.

== Triggers ==
Rules on what triggers a kill hand (known as "activating the kill") vary. Sometimes the kill is activated when the last pot won exceeds a particular value. One common value is ten times the value of the large bet (in a $20/$40 game, the kill would be active if the previous pot won was greater than $400). Another common way a kill is activated is when a single player wins two pots in a row.

The kill can be active during multiple consecutive hands. When the kill is triggered by a pot amount, if the kill pot exceeds a certain value (often 10 times the kill hand's large bet), the kill will remain active, though it may change players. When triggered by winning consecutive pots, the kill will typically remain active on the same player if that player continues to win consecutive hands.

In "split-pot" games such as high-low or when two players tie, if a player has won the previous hand and splits the pot with another player, that may also activate a kill hand. If a pot is split and neither player has won the previous hand, winning the pot of the next hand does not typically activate a kill hand. In high-low games, typically the kill is activated when one person takes the whole pot (known as "scooping"), either by having both the winning high and low hands, or by having the winning high hand when no low qualifies, though in some games the pot must exceed a specified amount for the kill to be triggered.

== The kill blind ==
The player who activates the kill hand must post an additional blind, called the kill blind. The kill blind can thus be posted from any position at the table including "in the blinds" or "on the button". The amount posted is most often twice the normal big blind or small bet for that game, known as a "full kill". For example, in a $20/$40 limit game, the large blind and small bet are $20. The full kill blind for such a game would be $40.

The kill blind is usually a "live" bet (counting toward the amount of any bet to the player). This may additionally mean that the person posting the kill blind has the privilege of last action (the "option"), instead of the person in the big blind. For example, in a five-handed game where player E has the kill button and player A is the dealer, the order of action would be player D, player A (dealer), player B (the small blind), player C (the big blind), player E (the kill blind). After the first round, betting returns to normal.

There are three common options for dealing with a player in the blinds who must also pay the kill blind. First, they may pay only the kill blind and their scheduled blind is not posted. Second, the player may be required to post both their scheduled blind and the kill blind for that hand, with only the kill blind being "live" for determining that player's bet amount (this method adds an extra element of risk to the player "under the gun"). Lastly, the player may post their kill blind in this hand, and then "owe" their scheduled blind in the next hand when they no longer have to post the kill blind, similar to the moving button rule of blinds busting out. This can cause a shifting of all blinds to a player who triggered a kill while "under the gun"; the player would first post the kill blind when the big blind was due, then in the next hand (assuming they didn't have to pay the kill blind again) they would pay their big blind instead of the small blind that is now due. On the third hand, with the player on the button, the small blind would be paid and the player is now "caught up".

== Kill stakes ==
When the full kill is active, the stakes of the game are doubled such that the kill blind becomes the minimum bet for the opening round. For example, if a game has limits of $20/$40 and a full kill blind is posted for a hand, the betting limits for that hand are doubled to $40/$80. A pot built from this betting structure is known as a kill pot.

== Variants ==
=== Half kill ===
A common variant of the hereto described "full kill" is the "half kill". Play is similar, except that the kill blind is 1.5 times the big blind instead of double, and the betting limits are adjusted accordingly. A $20/$40 game with a half-kill activated would have a kill blind of $30 and betting limits of $30/$60.

Sometimes a half-kill and full kill are both used; a player might win two pots to activate the half-kill, and if they win the half-kill pot a full kill is triggered. If played using a pot amount as the trigger, a half-kill might be at 10 times the normal large bet and a full kill at 15 (or if the kill pot of a half-kill hand is 10 times the half-kill's large bet).

=== Double kill ===
Another variant concept, related to the use of the half and full kill in the same game, is the "double-kill". It is generally either a kill triggered when a kill is active or a kill triggered in circumstances doubling that of a full kill. Thus, in a $20/$40 game, if a kill is activated by a pot size of $400, a double-kill would be activated at $800, whether that pot was from a normal hand or a kill hand. If the kill is activated by two consecutive wins, the double-kill is activated when the same player wins four times in a row (two normal and two kill hands).

Rules vary on determining the blinds and limits of a double-kill game; it can either be triple the normal amounts (the normal structure plus two kill increases) or four times normal (the normal amount doubled for kill, then doubled again). A kill game of $20/$40, therefore, might have double kill limits of $60/$120 or $80/$160; double-kill pots for this reason can become quite large compared to normal pots.

== See also ==
- Poker betting
