= Big bet =

Bet amount in a fixed-limit poker game

A big bet (BB) is the larger of two fixed bet amounts in a fixed-limit poker game. Big bets are generally double the wager of the initial or small bet, and are used in the latter betting rounds of hands. In these games the small bet applies to the earlier rounds and the big bet to the later ones, and the two limits are written as a pair, so that a game with a $2 small bet and a $4 big bet is described as a "$2/$4" game. Any multi-round poker game can use big bets to standardize wagers while maintaining a sufficient risk-ratio to encourage bluffing. Casino poker tables use big bets to set a limit to the amount of money a patron can lose in each wager. The fixed big bet of limit play is distinct from big-bet poker, a broader term for no-limit and pot-limit formats in which wagers are large relative to the pot rather than capped at a set amount.

== Statistical analysis ==
Big bets are used in place of variable limit raises to add considerable risk to staying in a game until a hand is shown. This added risk enables other players to bluff or to win a considerable pot when proving that they weren't bluffing. The relationship between a fixed bet size and the optimal frequency of bluffing has been examined in the game-theoretic study of poker, beginning with the continuous-poker models of von Neumann and Morgenstern and continuing in later work that solves for equilibrium play under limited bet sizes. Other methods of adding structure to poker games include buy-in limits and maximum raise limits. Some sort of table or bet limits are required in poker to keep a person with the "deepest pockets" from "buying the game."

== Examples ==
Big bets are common in casino play, where the open buy-in lets players join the table at any time and the fixed limit caps the wager on each betting round.

=== Casino-style draw poker ===
Big bets are used in draw poker during the final round of betting to discourage tentative players. In theory, only those committed to their hand after seeing their final cards will be motivated to wager twice as much as their previous bet. In practice, however, additional motivation for players to fold is usually needed in a single draw game such as: a half-pot limit, a pot limit, or a spread limit. No limit poker is only employed when table limits are imposed, thereby disallowing casino guests to join the table after play has started.

=== Texas hold 'em ===
In a $2/$4 Texas hold 'em game, the big bet would be $4, wagered in each bet of the last two rounds. The $2 would be the small bet, wagered during all other bets of the game.

=== Omaha hold 'em ===
Big bets are used in Omaha poker to allow buy-ins of players at any time. Omaha Eight-or-Better has a greater odds of winning and therefore less motivation to fold with a tentative hand. For that reason Omaha Eight-or-Better is sometimes played in a pot limit betting structure instead of big bets.

=== Casino-style seven-card stud ===
Big bets are used in seven-card stud, generally after the last upcard, to motivate tentative players who already have a lot of money in the pot to fold anyway. By the last upcard, seven-card stud players have wagered an ante and three rounds of betting. With that much money already in the pot, there is little motivation to drop out during the final two rounds of betting, especially when there is a possibility that another player may be bluffing. The effect of adding the requirement of a big bet to the final two rounds of seven-card stud betting is that the game becomes one more of skill than of luck.
