= Betting in poker =

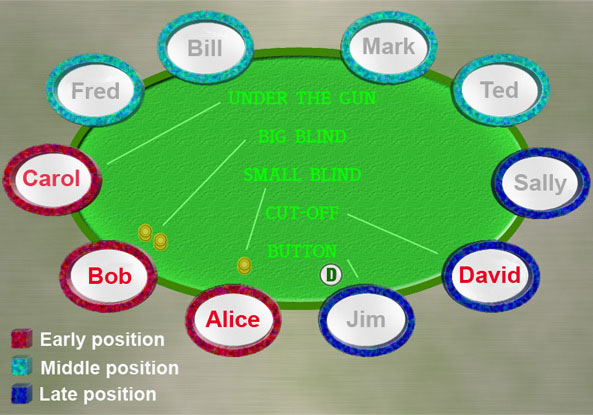
Poker positions at a 10-handed table.

In the game of poker, the play largely centers on the act of betting, and as such, a protocol has been developed to speed up play, lessen confusion, and increase security while playing. Different games are played using different types of bets, and small variations in etiquette exist between cardrooms, but for the most part the following rules and protocol are observed by the majority of poker players.

== Procedure ==
Players in a poker game act in turn, in clockwise rotation (acting out of turn can negatively affect other players). When it is a player's turn to act, the first verbal declaration or action they take binds them to their choice of action; this rule prevents a player from changing their action after seeing how other players react to their initial action.

Until the first bet is made each player in turn may "check", which is to not place a bet, or "open", which is to make the first bet. After the first bet each player may "fold", which is to drop out of the hand losing any bets they have already made; "call", which is to match the highest bet so far made; or "raise", which is to increase the previous high bet.

A player may fold by surrendering one's cards. (Some games may have specific rules regarding how to fold: for example in stud poker one must turn one's upcards face down.) A player may check by tapping the table or making any similar motion. All other bets are made by placing chips in front of the player, but not directly into the pot ("splashing the pot" prevents other players from verifying the bet amount).

=== Order of betting ===
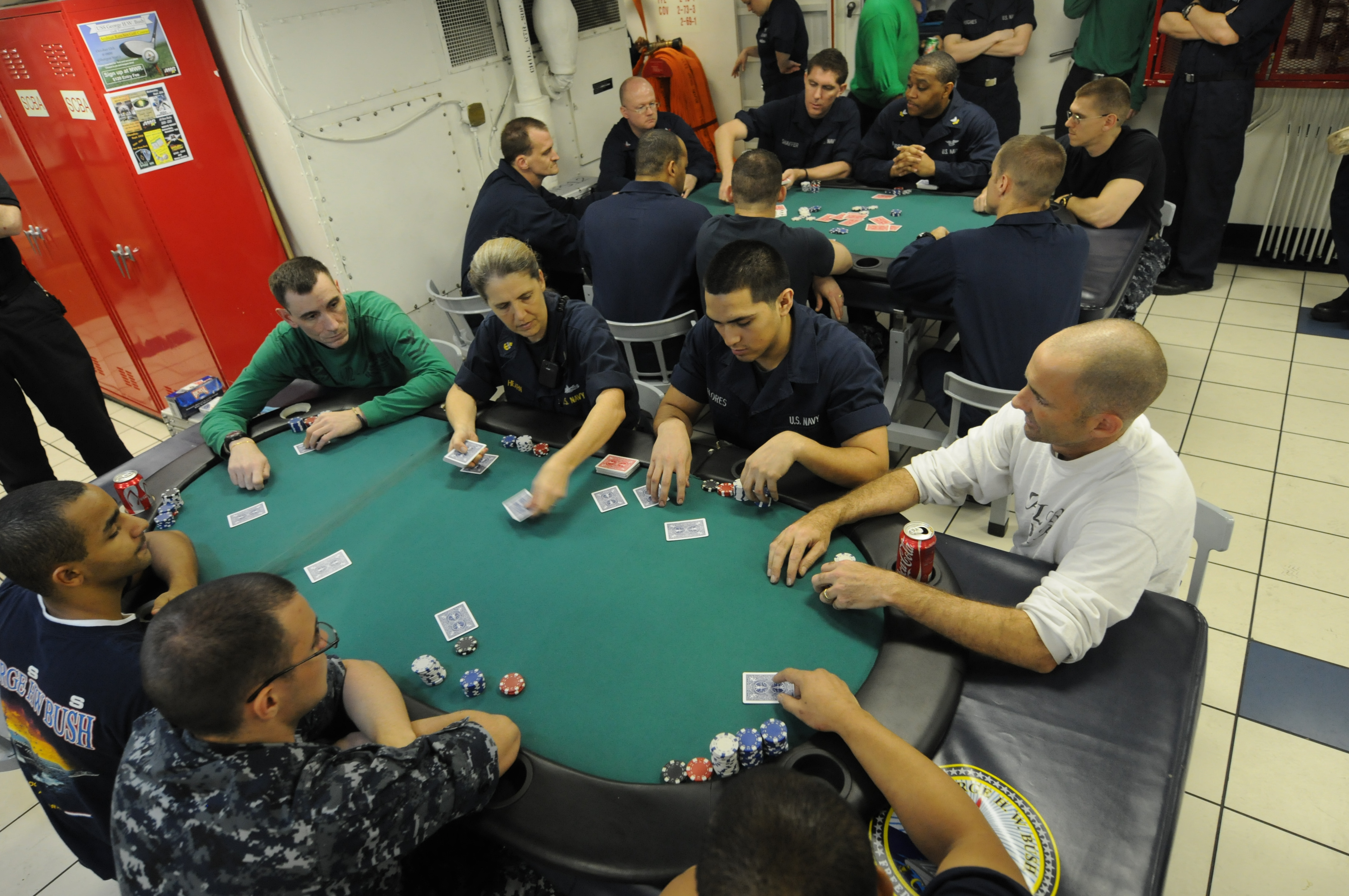
Play proceeds to the left of the dealer

In general, the person to the left of the dealer acts first and action proceeds in a clockwise fashion. If any player has folded earlier, action proceeds to next player. In games with blinds, the first round of betting begins with the player to the left of the blinds. In stud games, the action begins with the player showing the strongest cards and proceeds clockwise. If there is a bring-in, the first round of betting begins with the player obliged to post the bring-in.

=== Check ===
If no one has yet opened the betting round, a player may pass or check, which is equivalent to betting zero and/or to call the current bet of zero. When checking, a player declines to make a bet; this indicates that they do not wish to open, but do wish to keep their cards and retain the right to call or raise later in the same round if an opponent opens. In games played with blinds, players may not check on the opening round because the blinds are live bets and must be called or raised to remain in the hand. A player who has posted the big blind has the right to raise on the first round, called the option, if no other player has raised; if they decline to raise they are said to check their option. If all players check, the betting round is over with no additional money placed in the pot (often called a free round or free card). A common way to signify checking is to tap the table, either with a fist, knuckles, an open hand or the index finger(s).

=== Open, bet, raise ===
If in any betting round it is a player's turn to act and the action is unopened, then the player can open action in a betting round by making a bet—the act of making the first voluntary bet in a betting round is called opening the round. On the first betting round, it is also called opening the pot, though in variants where blind bets are common, the blind bets "open" the first betting round and other players call and/or raise the "big blind" bet. Some poker variations have special rules about opening a round that may not apply to other bets. For example, a game may have a betting structure that specifies different allowable amounts for opening than for other bets, or may require a player to hold certain cards (such as "Jacks or better") to open.

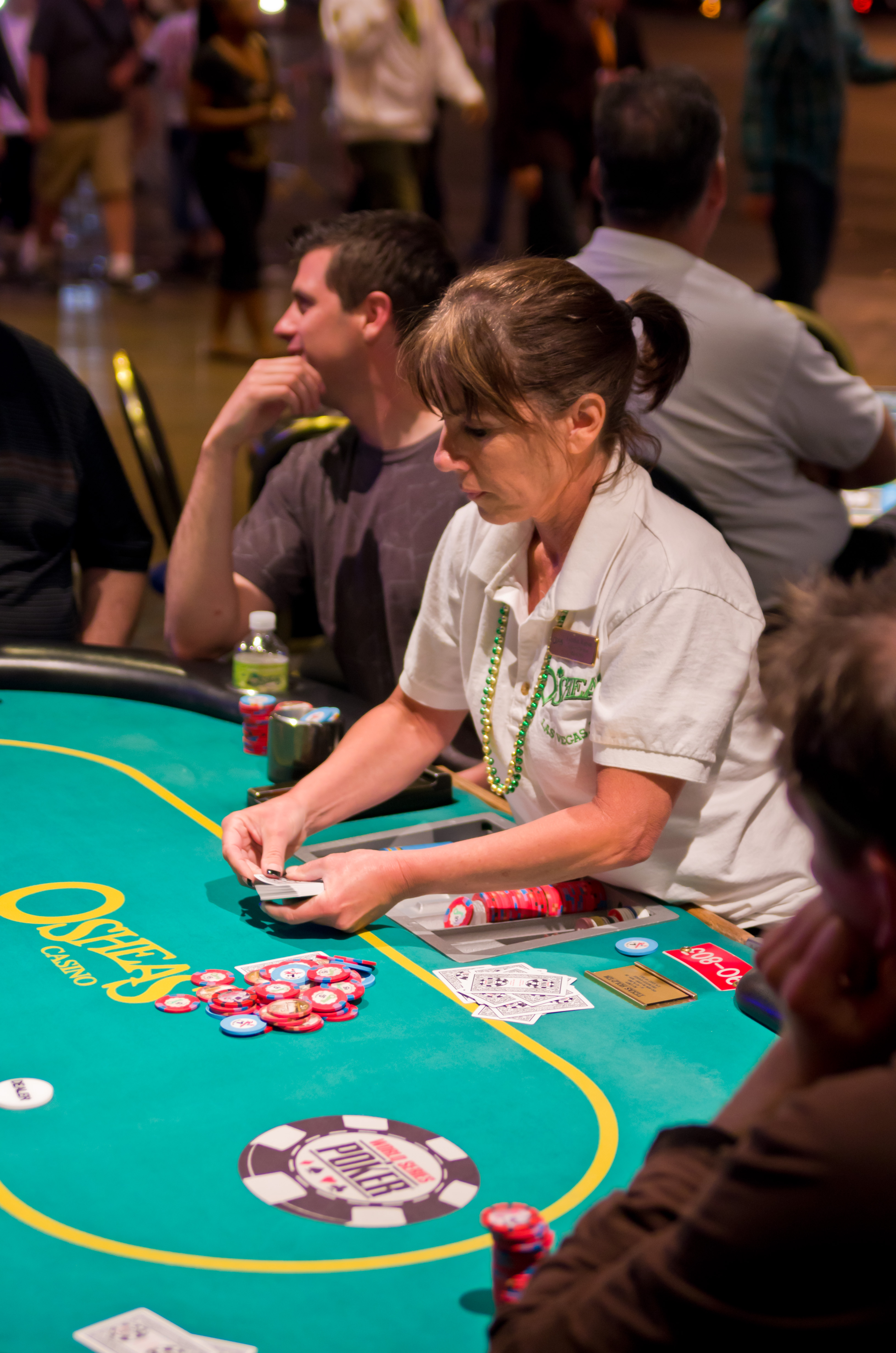
The pot of chips is normally kept in the center of the table

Normally, a player makes a bet by placing the chips they wish to wager into the pot. Under normal circumstances, all other players still in the pot must either call the full amount of the bet or raise if they wish to remain in, the only exceptions being when a player does not have sufficient stake remaining to call the full amount of the bet (in which case they may either call with their remaining stake to go "all-in" or fold) or when the player is already all-in.

To raise is to increase the size of an existing bet in the same betting round. A player making the second (not counting the open) or subsequent raise of a betting round is said to re-raise. A player making a raise after previously checking in the same betting round is said to check-raise. The sum of the opening bet and all raises is the amount that all players in the hand must call in order to remain eligible to win the pot, subject to the table stakes rules described in the previous paragraph.

A bluff is when a player bets or raises when it is likely they do not have the best hand; it is often done in hopes that (an) opponent(s) will fold mediocre yet stronger hands. When a player bets or raises with a weak hand that has a chance of improvement on a later betting round, the bet or raise is classified as a semi-bluff. On the other hand, a bet made by a player who hopes or expects to be called by weaker hands is classified as a value bet.

In no-limit and pot-limit games, there is a minimum amount that is required to be bet in order to open the action. In games with blinds, this amount is usually the amount of the big blind. Modern poker rules require that raises must be at least equal to the amount of the previous bet or raise. For example, if an opponent bets $5, a player must raise by at least another $5, and they may not raise by only $2. If a player raises a bet of $5 by $7 (for a total of $12), the next re-raise would have to be by at least another $7 (the previous raise) more than the $12 (for a total of at least $19). The primary purpose of the minimum raise rule is to avoid game delays caused by "nuisance" raises (small raises of large bets, such as an extra $1 over a current bet of $50, that have little effect on the action but take time as all others must call). This rule is overridden by table stakes rules, so that a player may in fact raise a $5 bet by $2 if that $2 is their entire remaining stake. The only exception is if someone goes all in for less than a legal raise. For example, if the minimum bet is $5 and a player goes all in for $4, the next player can call the $4; if they want to raise, they would have to make it $9 ($4 plus the minimum bet).

In no-limit and pot-limit games, if a player opens action in a betting round by placing any number of chips in the pot without a verbal declaration, or if they place two or more chips in the pot of sufficient value to raise an outstanding bet or raise without a verbal declaration, then the full amount placed in the pot will be assumed to be the amount of the bet or raise. Sometimes, a player will not have enough chips in smaller denominations that would be needed to make a bet or raise in the desired amount—for example, a player may be out of $1 and $5 chips and still have $25 chips—if the pot is currently $70 and the player wants to open action by betting half the pot, they will want to bet $35. In such cases, instead of slowing down the game by asking the dealer or another player to provide "change" a player may simply verbally declare the amount they are betting while placing (a) chip(s) of sufficient value to make good on the bet. Any "change" will be returned to them by the dealer if necessary.

Also in no-limit and pot-limit games, a raise may be expressed as either a raise by $X or a raise to $X. For example, suppose Alice opens by betting $5. If Dianne subsequently announces "I raise by $15" she will be raising by $15 over and above the opening bet of $5, for a total bet of $20. On the other hand, if Dianne subsequently announces "I raise to $15" she will be raising by only $10 for a total bet of $15. Today, most public cardrooms prefer for players to use the raise to standard as opposed to the raise by standard. In the event of any ambiguity in a player's verbal action while raising, the player will normally be bound to raise to the stated amount. For example, if Alice were to have opened with a $5 bet and Dianne subsequently announced "raise, $15" while putting $15 into pot (making the pot $20), in most public cardrooms Dianne would be bound to a total bet of $15 and the "excess" $5 would be returned to her.

In fixed-limit games, the size of bets and raises is determined by the specified stakes. For example, in $3/$6 fixed limit Hold 'em, during the first two betting rounds (preflop and flop) the big blind is $3, the opening bet after the flop must be for $3 and all raises must be for $3. For the last two betting rounds (turn and river) the opening bet must be for $6 and all raises must be for $6. As in no-limit and pot-limit games, these amounts will be overridden by table stakes rules (so for example, in $3/$6 fixed limit Hold 'em a player could bet, raise or call for only $2 at any time if that is their remaining stake).

Also, in fixed-limit and spread-limit games most casinos cap the total number of raises allowed in a single betting round (typically three or four, not including the opening bet of a round). For example, in a casino with a three-raise rule, if one player opens the betting for $5, the next raises by $5 making it $10, a third player raises another $5, and a fourth player raises $5 again making the current bet $20, the betting is said to be capped at that point, and no further raises beyond the $20 level will be allowed on that round. It is common to suspend this rule when there are only two players betting in the round (called being heads-up), since either player can call the last raise if they wish. Pot-limit and no-limit games do not have a limit on the number of raises.

If, because of opening or raising, there is an amount bet that the player in-turn has not paid, the player must at least match that amount, or must fold; the player cannot pass or call a lesser amount (except where table stakes rules apply).

=== Call ===
To call is to match a bet or match a raise. A betting round ends when all active players have bet an equal amount. If no opponents call a player's bet or raise, the player wins the pot.

The second and subsequent calls of a particular bet amount are sometimes called overcalls. This term is also sometimes used to describe a call made by a player who has put money in the pot for this round already. A player calling a raise before they have invested money in the pot in that round is cold calling. For example, if in a betting round, Alice bets, Dianne raises, and Carol calls, Carol "calls two bets cold". A player calling instead of raising with a strong hand is smooth calling or flat calling, a form of slow play.

Calling in the final betting round when a player thinks they do not have the best hand is called a crying call. Calling when a player has a relatively weak hand but suspects their opponent may be bluffing is called a hero call. Calling a bet prior to the final betting round with the intention of bluffing on a later betting round is called a float.

In public cardrooms, placing a single chip in the pot of any value sufficient to call an outstanding bet or raise without a verbal action declaring otherwise always constitutes a call. If necessary, any "change" from the chip will be returned to the player at the end of the betting round, or perhaps even sooner if this can conveniently be done. If, when it is a player's turn to act, the player already has an oversized chip in the pot that has not yet been "changed" and that is of sufficient value to call an outstanding bet or raise, then the player may call by tapping the table as if checking.

In public cardrooms and casinos where verbal declarations are binding, the word "call" is such a declaration. In public card rooms, the practice of saying "I call, and raise $100" is considered a string raise and is not allowed. Saying "I call" commits the player to the action of calling, and only calling.

Note that the verb "see" can often be used instead of "call": "Dianne saw Carol's bet", although the latter can also be used with the bettor as the object: "I'll see you" means 'I will call your bet'. However, terms such as "overseeing" and "cold seeing" are not valid.

=== Fold ===
To fold is to discard one's hand and forfeit interest in the current pot. No further bets are required by the folding player, but the player cannot win. Folding may be indicated verbally or by discarding one's hand face down into the pile of other discards called the muck, or into the pot (uncommon). For this reason it is also called mucking. In stud poker played in the United States, it is customary to signal folding by turning all of one's cards face down. Once a person indicates a fold or states I fold, that person cannot re-enter the hand. In casinos in the United Kingdom, a player folds by giving their hand as is to the "house" dealer, who spreads the cards face up for the other players to see before mucking them.

== Etiquette ==
=== Action and betting ===
When participating in the hand, a player is expected to keep track of the betting action. Losing track of the amount needed to call, called the bet to the player, happens occasionally, but multiple occurrences of this slow the game down and so it is discouraged. The dealer may be given the responsibility of tracking the current bet amount, from which each player has only to subtract their contribution, if any, thus far.

To aid players in tracking bets, and to ensure all players have bet the correct amount, players stack the amount they have bet in the current round in front of them. When the betting round is over (a common phrase is "the pot's good"), the players will push their stacks into the pot or the dealer will gather them into the pot. Tossing chips directly into the pot (known as splashing the pot), though popular in film and television depictions of the game, causes confusion over the amount of a raise and can be used to hide the true amount of a bet. Likewise, string raises, or the act of raising by first placing chips to call and then adding chips to raise, causes confusion over the amount bet. Both actions are generally prohibited at casinos and discouraged at least in other cash games.

==== Acting out of turn ====
Most actions (calls, raises or folds) occurring out-of-turn—when players to the right of the player acting have not yet made decisions as to their own action—are considered improper, for several reasons. First, since actions by a player give information to other players, acting out of turn gives the person in turn information that they normally would not have, to the detriment of players who have already acted.

For instance, say that with three players in a hand, Player A has a weak hand but decides to try a bluff with a large opening bet. Player C then folds out of turn while Player B is making up their mind. Player B now knows that if they fold, A will take the pot, and also knows that they cannot be re-raised if they call. This may encourage Player B, if they have a good "drawing hand" (a hand currently worth nothing but with a good chance to improve substantially in subsequent rounds), to call the bet, to the disadvantage of Player A.

Second, calling or raising out of turn, in addition to the information it provides, assumes all players who would act before the out of turn player would not exceed the amount of the out-of-turn bet. This may not be the case, and would result in the player having to bet twice to cover preceding raises, which would cause confusion.

=== Cards ===
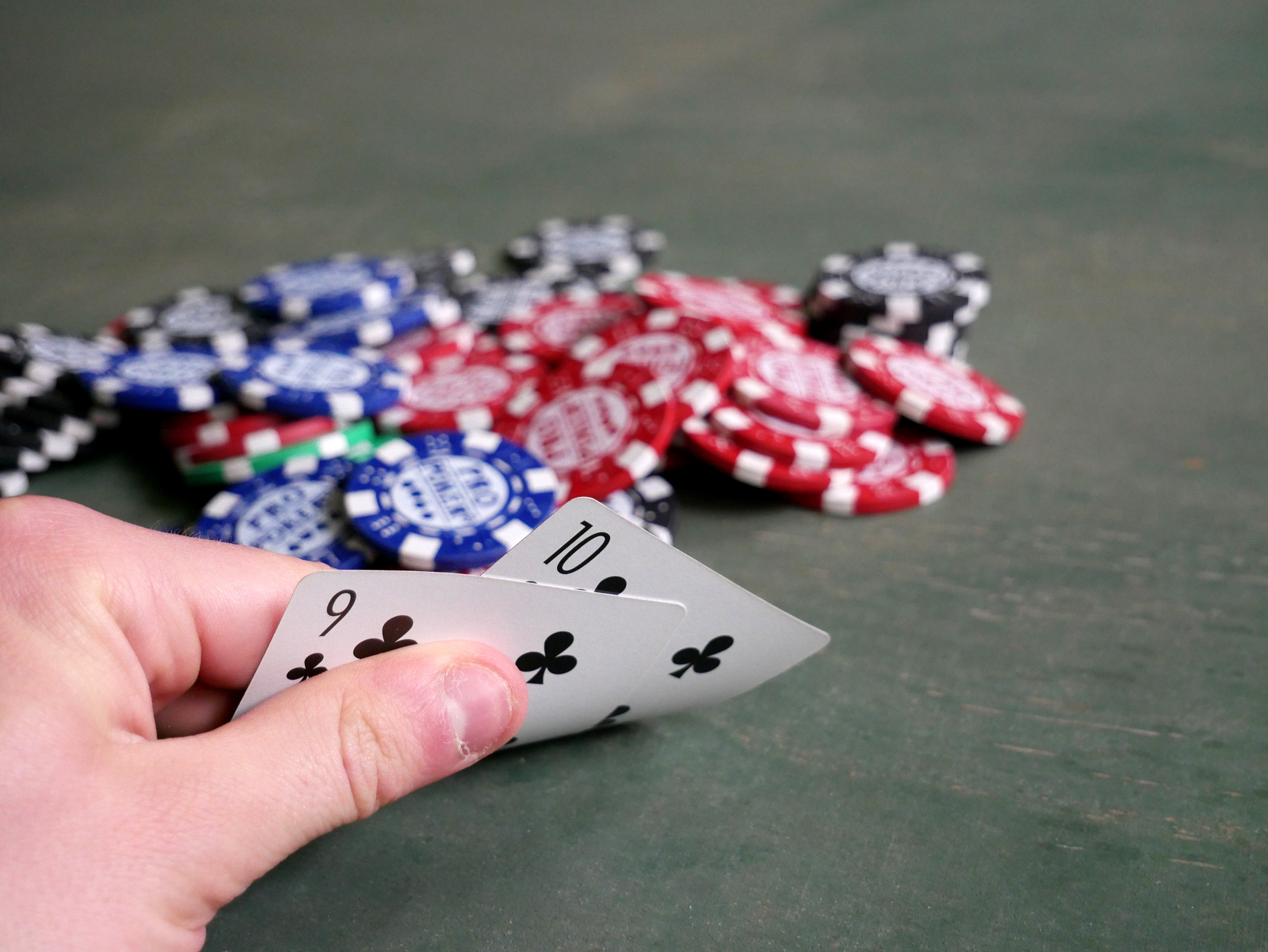
Players work to minimize the visibility of their hand to others by only turning up part of their cards

A player is never required to expose their concealed cards when folding or if all others have folded; this is only required at the showdown.

Many casinos and public cardrooms using a house dealer require players to protect their hands. This is done either by holding the cards or, if they are on the table, by placing a chip or other object on top. Unprotected hands in such situations are generally considered folded and are mucked by the dealer when action reaches the player. This can spark heated controversy, and is rarely done in private games.

The style of game generally determines whether players should hold face-down cards in their hands or leave them on the table. Holding "hole" cards allows players to view them more quickly and thus speeds up gameplay, but spectators watching over a player's shoulder can communicate the strength of that hand to other players, even unintentionally. Unwary players can hold their hand such that a "rubbernecker" in an adjacent seat can sneak a peek at the cards. Lastly, given the correct light and angles, players wearing glasses can inadvertently show their opponents their hole cards through the reflection in their glasses. Thus for most poker variants involving a combination of faceup and facedown cards (most variants of stud and community are dealt in this manner), the standard method is to keep hole cards face-down on the table except when it is that player's turn to act. Five-card draw is generally played with hands held by the players at all times.

=== Cash and chips ===
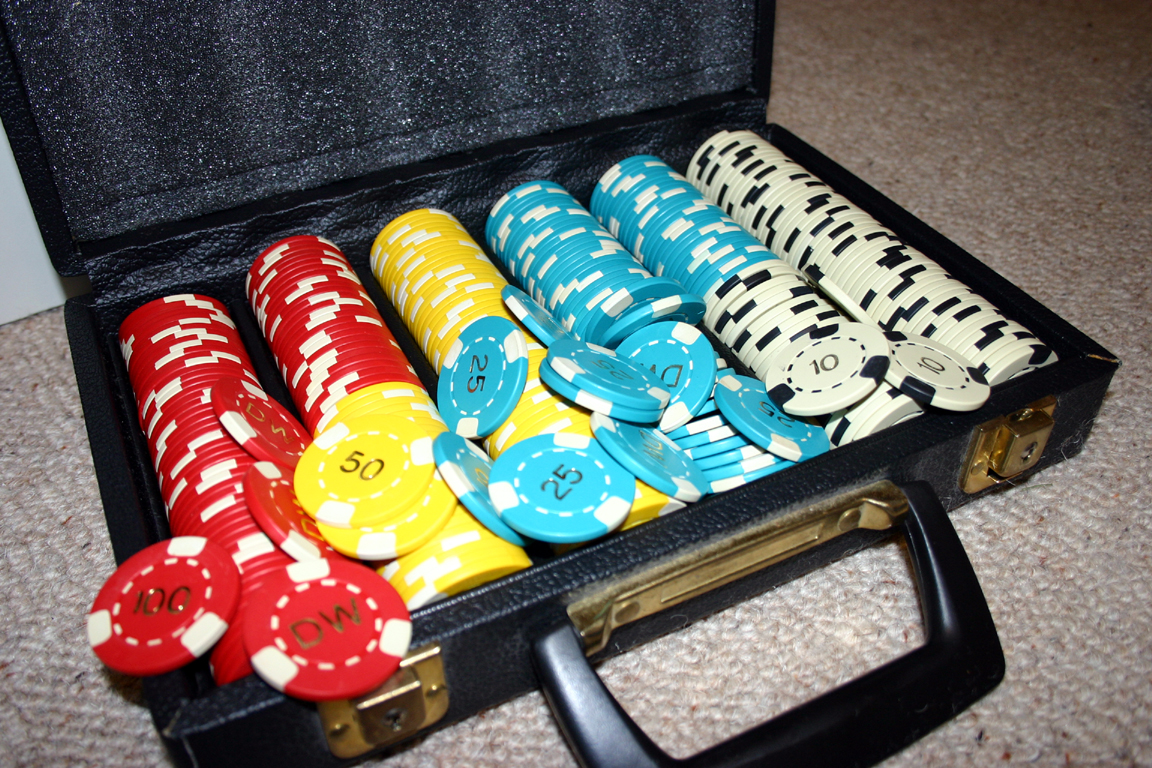
Chips are available in many denominations

Making change out of the pot is allowed in most games; to avoid confusion, the player should announce their intentions first. Then, if opening or cold calling, the player may exchange a large chip for its full equivalent value out of the pot before placing their bet, or if over-calling may place the chip (announcing that they are calling or raising a lesser amount) and remove the change from their own bet for the round. Normally, if a player places one oversized chip in the pot without explicitly voicing intention while facing a bet, the action is automatically deemed a call whether or not the chip is large enough to otherwise qualify as a raise. In most casinos players are prohibited from handling chips once they are placed in the pot, although a player removing their own previous bet in the current round from the pot for the purpose of calling a raise (or re-raising) is usually tolerated. Otherwise, the dealer is expected to make change when required.

Making change should, in general, be done between hands whenever possible, when a player sees they are running low of an oft-used value. The house dealer at most casinos maintains a chip bank and can usually make change for a large amount of chips. In informal games, players can make change with each other or with unused chips in the set. While this can prevent delays while players figure out change for a bet, casinos generally frown on or outright prohibit such practices to prevent players from surreptitiously "ratholing" (taking away and securing part of the stakes for personal use) and/or circumventing buy-in limits. Similarly, buying in for an additional amount must be done between hands (or, at least, done after a player has folded during the current hand) since players are not allowed to add to their stack during a hand. If buy-ins cannot and/or are not expected to be handled by the dealer it can take two or three hands for an attendant to bring another tray to the table. As described below, some casinos alleviate this issue by allowing cash to be deemed temporarily "in play" while staff fetches chips. Players who wish to always play with at least the buy-in limit will often carry additional chips in their pocket so that whenever they lose a pot they can quickly "top up" without inconveniencing the dealer or delaying the game.

While having players buy chips directly from the dealer is seen as a convenience by some players, and can help deter players from exceeding buy-in limits, many players dislike this system because it slows down the game, especially if the dealer is expected to count large numbers of small denominations of chips. Also, many jurisdictions require all such purchases (or, at least, all larger transactions) to be confirmed (primarily to ensure accuracy) by a supervisor or other staff member, potentially causing further delay. To speed up play (and, by extension, increase the number of hands dealt and rake earned by the casino), many casinos require players to buy chips from a cashier—to assist players, some establishments employ chip runners to bring cash and chips to and from the tables. Many casinos have a dedicated cashier station located in or very near the poker room, although in some (usually, smaller venues) the same cashier station that handles other transactions will also handle poker-related purchases. In addition, if the casino uses the same chips for poker as for other games then it is often possible to bring chips from such games to the poker table.

Touching another player's chips without permission is a serious breach of protocol and can result in the player being barred from the casino.

Most tournaments and many cash games require that larger denomination chips be stacked in front (i.e., closer to the center of the table, or closer to the pot) of the player's lesser denomination chips, or at least stacked in such a manner that they can be easily seen by all opponents. This rule is employed to discourage attempts to conceal stack size. Some casinos discourage, prohibit or simply refrain from circulating larger chip denominations to prevent them from being used in lower-stakes cash games, although the drawback is that larger stacks won during play will become more difficult to handle and manage as a result.

Some informal games allow a bet to be made by placing the amount of cash on the table without converting it to chips, as this speeds up play. However, table stakes rules strictly prohibit this from being done while a hand is in progress. Other drawbacks to using cash include the ease with which cash can be "ratholed", which is normally disallowed, in addition to the security risk of leaving cash on the table. As a result, many games and virtually all casinos require a formal "buy-in" when a player wishes to increase their stake, or at least require any cash placed on the table to be converted into chips as quickly as possible.

Players in home games typically have both cash and chips available; thus, if money for expenses other than bets is needed, such as food, drinks and fresh decks of cards, many players typically pay out of pocket. Some players (especially professionals) loathe removing any part of their stack from play for any reason, especially once their stacks exceed the initial buy-in limit. In casinos and public cardrooms, however, the use of cash is occasionally restricted or discouraged, so players often establish a small cache of chips called the "kitty", used to pay for such things. Players contribute a chip of lowest value towards the kitty when they win a pot, and it pays for expenses other than bets such as tipping the dealer as well as (where applicable) to pay for "rent" (formally known as time fees) and/or buying fresh decks of cards (while many public cardrooms include such costs in the "rake" or other fees, some charge separately for such things as playing cards and "rent"), and similar costs.

At a casino, dealers who exchange cash for chips are expected to immediately secure any cash by placing it into a locked box near their station. This means that regardless of how chips are purchased, when cashing them in it is typically not possible to sell them back to the dealer since they have no access to any cash. Poker chips must therefore be taken to the cashier to be exchanged for cash. Dealers who handle buy-ins will often be willing (and sometimes encourage) departing players to "color up" their stacks by exchanging them for the highest-available denominations, both for the convenience of the player and to minimize the number of times casino staff must deliver fresh chips to the poker table—a time-consuming process. On the other hand, casinos that expect players to buy chips from the cashier will usually furnish players with chip trays (typically designed to handle 100 chips each) to ease the handling of large numbers of chips.

Chips given by players or otherwise retained by the dealer for tips, rake and other fees (where applicable) are usually placed in separate locked boxes by the dealer, although in some casinos the rake is kept in a separate row in the dealer's tray.

=== Other rules ===
Public cardrooms often have additional rules designed to speed up play, earn revenue for the casino (such as the "rake"), improve security and discourage cheating.

== Forced bets ==
All poker games require some forced bets to create an initial stake for the players to contest, as well as an initial cost of being dealt each hand for one or more players. The requirements for forced bets and the betting limits of the game (see below) are collectively called the game's betting structure.

=== Ante ===
An ante is a forced bet in which all players put an equal amount of money or chips into the pot before the deal begins. Often this is either a single unit (a one-value or the smallest value in play) or some other small amount; a proportion such as a half or a quarter of the minimum bet is also common. An ante paid by every player ensures that a player who folds every round will lose money (though slowly), thus providing all players with an incentive, however small, to play the hand rather than toss it in when the opening bet reaches them.

Antes are the most common forced bet in draw poker and stud poker but are uncommon in games featuring blind bets (see next section). However, some tournament formats of games featuring blinds impose an ante to discourage extremely tight play. Antes encourage players to play more loosely by lowering the cost of staying in the hand (calling) relative to the current pot size, offering better pot odds. With antes, more players stay in the hand, which increases pot size and makes for more interesting play. This is considered important to ensure good ratings for televised tournament finals. Most televised high-stakes cash games also use both blinds and antes. Televised cash games usually have one of the players, normally the dealer, pay for everyone to accelerate play. If there are six players for example, the dealer would toss six times the ante into the pot, paying for each person. Tournaments which employ antes, often do so only in the later rounds.

In live cash games where the acting dealer changes each turn, it is not uncommon for the players to agree that the dealer (or some other position relative to the button) provides the ante for each player. This simplifies betting, but causes minor inequities if other players come and go or miss their turn to deal. During such times, the player can be given a special button indicating the need to pay an ante to the pot (known as "posting"; see below) upon their return. Some cardrooms eliminate these inequities by always dealing all players into every hand whether they are present or not. In such cases casino staff (or neighboring players under staff supervision) will be expected to post antes and fold hands on behalf of absent players as necessary.

=== Blinds ===
A standard Texas hold 'em game with blinds

A blind bet or just blind is a forced bet placed into the pot by one or more players before the deal begins, in a way that simulates bets made during play. The most common use of blinds as a betting structure calls for two blinds: the player after the dealer blinds about half of what would be a normal bet, and the next player blinds what would be a whole bet. This two-blind structure, sometimes with antes, is the dominating structure of play for community card poker games such as Texas hold 'em. Sometimes only one blind is used (often informally as a "price of winning" the previous hand), and sometimes three are used (this is sometimes seen in Omaha hold 'em). In the case of three blinds (usually one quarter, one quarter, and half a normal bet amount), the first blind goes "on the button", that is, is paid by the dealer.

A blind is usually a "live bet"; the amount paid as the blind is considered when figuring the bet to that player (the amount needed to call) during the first round. However, some situations, such as when a player was absent from the table during a hand in which they should have paid a blind, call for placing a "dead blind"; the blind does not count as a bet.

For example, in a $2–4 limit game, the first player to the dealer's left (who, if not for the blinds, would be the first to act) posts a small blind of $1, and the next player in turn posts a big blind of $2. After the cards are dealt, play begins with the next player in turn (third from the dealer), who must either call $2, raise, or fold. When the betting returns to the player who blinded $1, they must equal the bet facing them (toward which they may count their $1), raise, or fold. If there have been no raises when action first gets to the big blind (that is, the bet amount facing them is just the amount of the big blind they posted), the big blind has the ability to raise or check. This right to raise (called the option) occurs only once. As with any raise, if their raise is now called by every player, the first betting round closes as usual.

Similarly to a missed ante, a missed blind due to the player's temporary absence (e.g. for drinks or a restroom break) can be denoted by use of a special button. Upon the player's return, they must pay the applicable blind to the pot for the next hand they will participate in. The need for this rule is eliminated in casinos that deal in absent players as described above. Also the rule is for temporary absences only; if a player leaves the table permanently, special rules govern the assigning of blinds and button (see next subsection).

In some fixed-limit and spread-limit games, especially if three blinds are used, the big blind amount may be less than the normal betting minimum. Players acting after a sub-minimum blind have the right to call the blind as it is, even though it is less than the amount they would be required to bet, or they may raise the amount needed to bring the current bet up to the normal minimum, called completing the bet. For example, a limit game with a $5 minimum bet on the first round might have blinds of $1 and $2. Players acting after the blind may either call the $2, or raise to $5. After the bet is raised to $5, the next raise must be to $10 in accordance with the normal limits.

==== When a player in the blinds leaves the game ====
When one or more players pays the small or big blinds for a hand, then after that hand permanently leaves the game (by "busting out" in a tournament or simply calling it a night at a public cardroom), an adjustment is required in the positioning of the blinds and the button. There are three common rule sets to determine this:

- Simplified: The dealer button moves to the next active player on the left, and the small and big blinds are paid by the first and second players remaining to the left. This is the easiest to track and always rotates the button, but results in "missed blinds". For instance, a player "under the gun" when the player in the big blind busts out ends up paying the small blind; they have "missed" the big blind they would have paid had the leaving player remained in the game. Similarly, a player in the small blind who busts out means the player in the big blind gets the button, missing the small blind.
  - In the special case of three players in a tournament being reduced to the two-player showdown, any leftover blinds from other rules are "written off" and the Simplified method is used, with the player "on the button" paying the small blind.
- Moving button: As in Simplified, the button moves to the left to the next active player, and the blinds move to the next two active players. However, any "missed blinds" are paid by the player whom they skipped as if they were due for the upcoming hand, with one blind paid per player, per hand, biggest blind first. Any blind a player misses on a given hand because a bigger blind was due will be paid by the player in the following hand. This is the most complex ruleset to implement, especially if multiple players leave, but it is the fairest method overall in terms of paying all due blinds and rotating last action.
- Dead button: Spots vacated by leaving players who would pay the small blind or get the button during the next hand remain open for the purposes of shifting blinds and button. Thus, the small blind may not be paid in the subsequent hand if the player due to pay the small blind has vacated the spot and, therefore, is considered "dead". However, there is always a big blind even if the spot is vacated by the player who is due to pay the big blind; in such case, the player seated to the left of the vacated spot pays the big blind. When the dealer button moves to an empty seat, it also is considered "dead", and the last active player before the empty seat retains the "privilege of last action" by default. While simple in tournament formats and the most equitable in terms of paying blinds as due and when normally expected, it can result in inequitable strategic situations regarding last action, and becomes harder to track if the table is "open" (players can come and go) as in a casino.

In tournaments, the dead button and moving button rules are common (replacement players are generally not a part of tournaments). Online cash games generally use the simplified moving button as other methods are more difficult to codify and can be abused by players constantly entering and leaving.

Casino card rooms where players can come and go can use any of the three rulesets, though moving button is most common. When a player immediately takes the place of a player who leaves, the player may have the option to either pay the blinds in the leaving player's stead, in which case play continues as if the player never left, or to "sit out" until the button has moved past them, and thus the chair is effectively empty for purposes of the blinds. Many card rooms do not allow new players to sit out as it is highly advantageous for the new player, both to watch one or more hands without obligation to play, and to enter the game in a very "late" position (on their first hand they see all other player's actions except the dealer's). For these reasons, new players must often post a "live" big blind to enter regardless of their position at the table.

==== When there are only two players ====
The normal rules for positioning the blinds do not apply when there are only two players at the table. The player on the button is always due the small blind, and the other player must pay the big blind. The player on the button is therefore the first to act before the flop, but last to act for all remaining betting rounds.

A special rule is also applied for placement of the button whenever the size of the table shrinks to two players. If three or more players are involved in a hand, and at the conclusion of the hand one or more players have busted out such that only two players remain for the next hand, the position of the button may need to be adjusted to begin heads-up play. The big blind always continues moving, and then the button is positioned accordingly.

For example, in a three-handed game, Alice is the button, Dianne is the small blind, and Carol is the big blind. If Alice busts out, the next hand Dianne will be the big blind, and the button will skip past Dianne and move to Carol. On the other hand, if Carol busts out, Alice will be the big blind, Dianne will get the button and will have to pay the small blind for the second hand in a row.

=== Kill blind ===
A kill blind is a special blind bet made by a player who triggers the kill in a kill game. It is often twice the amount of the big blind or minimum bet (known as a full kill), but can be 1.5 times the big blind (a half-kill) or any other amount according to house rules. This blind is "live"; the player posting it normally acts last in the opening round (after the other blinds, regardless of relative position at the table), and other players must call the amount of the kill blind to play. As any player can trigger a kill, there is the possibility that the player must post a kill blind when they are already due to pay one of the other blinds. Rules vary on how this is handled.

=== Bring-in ===
A bring-in is a type of forced bet that occurs after the cards are initially dealt, but before any other action. One player, usually chosen by the value of cards dealt face up on the initial deal, is forced to open the betting by some small amount, after which players act after them in normal rotation. Because of this random first action, bring-ins are usually used in games with an ante instead of structured blind bets.

The bring-in is normally assigned on the first betting round of a stud poker game to the player whose upcards indicate the poorest hand. For example, in traditional high hand stud games and high-low split games, the player showing the lowest card pays the bring-in. In low hand games, the player with the highest card showing pays the bring-in. The high card by suit order can be used to break ties, but more often the person closest to the dealer in order of rotation pays the bring-in.

In most fixed-limit and some spread-limit games, the bring-in amount is less than the normal betting minimum (often half of this minimum). The player forced to pay the bring-in may choose either to pay only what is required (in which case it functions similarly to a small blind) or to make a normal bet. Players acting after a sub-minimum bring-in have the right to call the bring-in as it is, even though it is less than the amount they would be required to bet, or they may raise the amount needed to bring the current bet up to the normal minimum, called completing the bet. For example, a game with a $5 fixed bet on the first round might have a bring-in of $2. Players acting after the bring-in can either call the $2, or increase it to $5, which would count as a normal bet, not a raise. After the bet is completed to $5, the first raise must be to $10 in accordance with the normal limits.

In a game where the bring-in is equal to the fixed bet (this is rare and not recommended), the game must either allow the bring-in player to optionally come in for a raise, or else the bring-in must be treated as live in the same way as a blind, so that the player is guaranteed their right to raise on the first betting round (the "option") if all other players call.

=== Post ===
Some cash games, especially with blinds, require a new player to post when joining a game already in progress. Posting in this context means putting an amount equal to the big blind or the minimum bet into the pot before the deal. This amount is also called a "dead blind". The post is a "live" bet, meaning that the amount can be applied towards a call or raise when it is the player's turn to act. If the player is not facing a raise when the action gets to them, they may also "check their option" as if they were in the big blind.

A player who is away from their seat and misses one or more blinds is also required to post to reenter the game. In this case, the amount to be posted is the amount of the big or small blind, or both, at the time the player missed them. If both must be posted immediately upon return, the big blind amount is "live", but the small blind amount is "dead", meaning that it cannot be considered in determining a call or raise amount by that player. Some house rules allow posting one blind per hand, largest first, meaning all posts of missed blinds are live.

Posting is usually not required if the player who would otherwise post happens to be in the big blind. This is because the advantage that would otherwise be gained by missing the blind, that of playing several hands before having to pay blinds, is not the case in this situation. It is therefore common for a new player to lock up a seat and then wait several hands before joining a table, or for a returning player to sit out several hands until the big blind comes back around, so that they may enter in the big blind and avoid paying the post. For this same reason, only one set of missed blinds can be accumulated by the player; old missed blinds are removed when the big blind returns to that player's seat because the player was never in any position to gain from missing the blinds.

In online poker it is common for the post to be equal in size to a big blind and to be live, just like the big blind. This can create a tactical advantage for the player if they choose not to play during the time they would otherwise spend in the blind in full ring games.

== Straddle and sleeper bets ==
A straddle bet is an optional and voluntary blind bet made by a player after the posting of the small and big blinds, but before cards are dealt. Straddles are typically used only in cash games played with fixed blind structures. Some jurisdictions and casinos prohibit live straddles. Straddles are normally not permitted in tournament formats and are rarely allowed online.

The purpose of a straddle is to "buy" the privilege of last action, which on the first round with blinds is normally the player in the big blind. A straddle or sleeper blind may count as a raise towards the maximum number of raises allowed, or it may count separately; in the latter case this raises the maximum total bet of the first round. For example, straddling is permitted in Nevada and Atlantic City but illegal in other areas on account of differences in state and local laws.

=== Live straddle ===
The player immediately to the left of the big blind ("under the gun", UTG) may place a live straddle blind bet. The straddle must be the size of a normal raise over the big blind. A straddle is a live bet; but does not become a "bigger blind". The straddle acts as a minimum raise but with the difference being that the straddler still gets their option of acting when the action returns to them. In a no-limit game if any other player wants to make a raise with a straddle on board, the minimum raise will be the difference between the big blind and the straddle.

Example: small blind is at 5, big blind is 10 then a straddle would cost 20. The minimum raise would be 10, for a total of 30; it doesn't need to double to 40.

Action begins with the player to the left of the straddle. If action returns to the straddle without a raise, the straddle has the option to raise. (This is part of what makes a straddle different from a sleeper because a sleeper does not have the option to raise if everyone folds or calls around to him.) Some casinos permit the player to the left of a live straddle to re-straddle by placing a blind bet raising the original straddle. Most public cardrooms do not permit more than one re-straddle. Depending on house rules, each re-straddle is often required to be double the previous straddle, so as to limit the number of feasible re-straddles.

Straddling is considered poor long-term strategy by most experts, since the benefit of obtaining last action is more than offset by the cost of making a blind raise. Because straddling has a tendency to enrich the average pot size without a corresponding increase in the blinds (and antes if applicable), players who sit at tables that allow straddling can increase their profits considerably simply by choosing not to straddle themselves.

==== Mandatory straddles ====
Straddling is voluntary at most cardrooms that allow it, however house rules can make straddling obligatory at times by using a special token (called "the rock") at the table. Whoever is in possession of the "rock" is obliged to place a live straddle for double the big blind when they are in the UTG position. The winner of the ensuing pot takes possession of the "rock" and is obliged to make a live straddle when the UTG position comes around to this player. If the pot is split the "rock" goes to the winner closest to the left (i.e. clockwise) of the previous holder. This is very similar in principle to the "kill blind" of a kill game, but does not necessarily occur in the same circumstances, and the betting amounts do not have to be affected beyond the first round as in a kill game.

=== Mississippi straddle ===
A Mississippi straddle is similar to a live straddle, but instead of being made by the player "under the gun", it can be made by any player, depending on house rules (one common variation is to allow this left of big blind or on the button). House rules permitting Mississippi straddles are common in the southern United States. Like a live straddle, a Mississippi straddle must be at least the minimum raise. Action begins with the player to the left of the straddle (in a common variation, action starts left of the big blind, skips over the straddle who is last). If, for example (in a game with $10–25 blinds), the button puts a live $50 on it, the first player to act would be the small blind, followed by the big blind, and so on. If action gets back to the straddle the straddle has the option of raising. The player to the left of a Mississippi straddle may re-straddle by placing a blind bet raising the original straddle.

=== Sleepers ===
A sleeper is a blind raise, made from a position other than the player "under the gun". A Mississippi straddle is a sleeper raise given this definition, but Mississippi straddles can be disallowed or restricted while sleepers are allowed at any position. A sleeper bet is not given the option to raise if other players call, and the player is not buying last action; thus the sleeper bet simply establishes a higher minimum to call for the table during the opening round and allows the player to ignore their turn as long as no one re-raises the sleeper bet.

Sleepers are often considered illegal out-of-turn play and are commonly disallowed, but they can speed up a game slightly as a player who posts a sleeper can focus their attention on other matters such as ordering a drink or buying a tray of chips. It can also be an intimidation tactic as a sleeper raise makes it unfeasible to "limp in" (a situation where a player with a mediocre starting hand but acting late only has to call the minimum to see more cards), thus forcing weaker but improvable starting hands out of the play.

=== Examples ===
A game of no-limit poker with blinds of $1/$2. Alice is in the small blind, Dianne is in the big blind, Carol is next to act, followed by Joane, with Ellen on the button.

- Straddle: Alice posts $1, Dianne posts $2, Carol posts a straddle of $4. The hole cards are dealt. Because of the straddle, Joane is now first to act; she folds. Ellen calls the straddle. Alice folds. Dianne, the big blind, calls the straddle by putting an additional $2 in the pot. Carol has the option of checking or raising; she makes a raise of $8. Ellen folds. Dianne calls the raise, ending betting on this round.
- Mississippi straddle: Alice posts $1, Dianne posts $2, Ellen, on the button, posts a Mississippi straddle of $4. Because of the straddle, Alice, the small blind, is now first to act; she folds. Dianne calls the straddle by putting an additional $2 in the pot. Carol folds. Joane calls the straddle. Ellen has the option of checking or raising; she checks, ending betting on this round.
- Sleeper: Alice posts $1, Dianne posts $2, and Joane posts a sleeper blind of $4. The hole cards are dealt. Carol acts first as last action remains with the big blind, but the bet to her is $4. She calls. There is no additional bet to Joane and she has no option, so play passes over her to Ellen. She calls the $4 as well. Alice folds. Dianne, in the big blind, no longer has the option either; she must either call $2, raise, or fold. She raises by $4 (total bet is now $8). Carol re-raises to $12. The bet is now $8 to Joane, who must now call, raise or fold; she calls, as do Ellen and Dianne, ending the betting round.

== Limits ==
Betting limits apply to the amount a player may open or raise, and come in four common forms: no limit, pot limit (the two collectively called big bet poker), fixed limit, and spread limit.

All such games have a minimum bet as well as the stated maximums, and also commonly a betting unit, which is the smallest denomination in which bets can be made. For example, it is common for games with $20 and $40 betting limits to have a minimum betting unit of $5, so that all bets must be in multiples of $5, to simplify game play. It is also common for some games to have a bring-in that is less than the minimum for other bets. In this case, players may either call the bring-in, or raise to the full amount of a normal bet, called completing the bet.

=== Fixed limit ===
In a game played with a fixed-limit betting structure, a player chooses only whether to bet or not—the amount is fixed by rule in most situations. To enable the possibility of bluffing and protection, the fixed amount generally doubles at some point in the game. This double wager amount is referred to as a big bet.

For example, a four-round game called "20 and 40 limit" (usually written as $20/$40) may specify that each bet in the first two rounds is $20, and that each big bet used in the third and fourth rounds is $40. This amount applies to each raise, not the total amount bet in a round, so a player may bet $20, be raised by $20, and then re-raise by another $20, for a total bet of $60, in such a game.

Some limit games have rules for specific situations allowing a player to choose between a small or big bet. For example, in seven-card stud high, when a player has a face-up pair on the second round (4th street), players may choose a small or big bet (e.g. $20 or $40 in a 20–40 game).

==== Maximum number of raises ====
Most fixed-limit games will not allow more than a predefined number of raises in a betting round. The maximum number of raises depends on the casino house rules, and is usually posted conspicuously in the card room. Typically, an initial bet plus either three or four raises are allowed.

Consider this example in a $20/$40 game, with a posted limit of a bet and three raises. During a $20 round with three players, play could proceed as follows:

- Player A bets $20.
- Player B puts in another bet, raises another $20, making it $40 to play.
- Player C puts in a third bet, raising another $20 on that, thus making it $60 to play.
- Player A puts in the fourth bet (they are usually said to cap the betting).

Once Player A has made their final bet, Players B and C may only call another two and one bets (respectively); they may not raise again because the betting is capped.

A common exception in this rule practiced in some card rooms is to allow unlimited raising when a pot is played heads up (when only two players are in the hand at the start of the betting round). Usually, this has occurred because all other players have folded, and only two remain, although it is also practiced when only two players get dealt in. Many card rooms will permit these two players to continue re-raising each other until one player is all in.

==== Kill game ====
Sometimes a fixed-limit game is played as a kill game. In such a game, a kill hand is triggered when a player wins a pot over a certain predetermined amount, or when the player wins a certain number of consecutive hands. The player triggering the kill must post a kill blind, generally either 1.5 times (a half kill) or double (a full kill) the amount of the big blind. In addition, the betting limits for the kill hand are multiplied by 1.5 or doubled, respectively.

The term kill, when used in this context, should not be confused with killing a hand, which is a term used for a hand that was made a dead hand by action of a game official.

=== Spread limit ===
A game played with a spread-limit betting structure allows a player to raise any amount within a specified range. For example, a game called "one to five limit" allows each bet to be anywhere from $1 to $5 (subject to other betting rules). These limits are typically larger in later rounds of multi-round games. For example, a game might be "one to five, ten on the end", meaning that early betting rounds allow bets of $1 to $5, and the last betting round allows bets of $1 to $10. Playing spread-limit requires some care to avoid giving easy tells with one's choice of bets. Beginners frequently give themselves away by betting high with strong hands and low with weak ones, for instance. It is also harder to force other players out with big bets.

There is a variation of this known as "California Spread," where the range is much higher, such as 3–100 or 10–1000. California Spread, as the name implies, is played in California, Colorado, and Minnesota, where local laws forbid no limit.

=== Half-pot limit ===
In a half-pot limit game, no player can raise more than the half of the size of the total pot. Half-pot limit games are often played at non-high-low games including Badugi in South Korea.

=== Pot limit ===
TABLE 1
Action	Pot size
$20 from first round	$20 Starting Pot
Player A bets $5	$20 Starting pot $ 5 Player A's bet ——— $25 New pot total
Player B declares "Pot"	$20 Starting pot $ 5 Player A's bet $ 5 Player B's call* ——— $30 Pot $30 Player B's raise* ——— $60 New pot total (*these amounts total $35,   Player B's pot raise)
Player C calls	$20 Starting pot $ 5 Player A's bet $35 Player B's pot raise $35 Player C's call ——— $95 New pot total
Player D declares "Pot"	$20 Starting pot $ 5 Player A's bet $35 Player B's pot bet $35 Player C's call $35 Player D's call* ——— $130 Pot $130 Player D's raise* ——— $260 New pot total (*these amounts total $165   Player D's pot raise)
Players A folds; Players B and C call	$20 Starting pot $ 5 Player A's bet $ 35 Player B's pot bet $ 35 Player C's call $165 Player D's pot raise $ 0 Player A folds $130 Player B's call $130 Player C's call ——— $520 New pot total

In a pot-limit game no player can raise more than the size of the total pot, which includes:

1. Chips collected from previous betting rounds (Starting pot)
2. Previous action in the current betting round (Trail)
3. A call from the player making the raise

This does not preclude a player from raising less than the maximum so long as the amount of the raise is equal to or greater than any previous bet or raise in the same betting round.

Making a maximum raise is referred to as "raising the pot", or "potting", and can be announced by the acting player by declaring "Raise pot", or simply "Pot".

If there is $20 in the pot at the start of a betting round in a $2/$5 pot limit game, and Player A bets $5, player B may "raise the pot" and wager $35 creating a new pot total of $60. This is derived from the $20 previous round action, Player A's $5 bet, Player B's $5 call, and player B's $30 Pot Raise ($20+$5+$5+$30=$60). Bear in mind, however, that $60 is the new pot, player B's "Pot" declaration will cost them $35. (These actions, with additional follow-up wagering, are laid out in Table '1' on the right.)

Only pot limit games allow the dealer, on request, to inform the players of the pot size and the amount of a pot raise before it's made. The dealer is also required to push any amount over the maximum raise back to the offending player. Keeping track of those numbers can be harrowing if the action becomes heated, but there are simple calculations that allow a dealer or player to keep track of the maximum raise amount. Here is an example:

(3L+T)+S=M

where:

L=last wager T=trail(action prior to previous bet) S=starting pot(previous round action) and M=maximum bet

Going to player D's actions in TABLE 1 on the right:

The last wager made was made by Player C ($35), so L=$35
The trail is the total of Player A+Player B ($5+$35), so T=$40
The starting pot is $20, so S=$20
The value of M(maximum bet) is $165

(35*3)+40+20=$165

After some practice, it is not difficult to keep up with the action at the table.

There may be some variance between cash and tournament play in pot limit betting structures, which should be noted:

- At some cash tables, it may not be a requirement that the dealer immediately return the extra amount of an overbet. If the over bet is not contested by a player before any additional action, the wager stands. If the overbet is contested, the dealer must know the overage amount, and return it to the offending player. This is something to find out before sitting at the table.
- Tournaments use a "True Pot" method of calculations, where the first round maximum raise to the first acting player is seven times the small blind. The blinds in a cash game, however, may not be a half and full bet (e.g. $2/$5) making the calculations run awry. In these cases a modification known as "Assumed Call" is used. Using an assumed call, the maximum raise to the first acting player in the first round is four times the big blind. Simply enough, the pot is treated as if the small blind had called, even if that player folded, to keep the pot's math more manageable.

Because the calculations can be confusing, especially as tournament blind levels increase, major tournaments will include the amount of the small blind, big blind, minimum raise and maximum raise with the printed blind schedule and/or display them on the tournament timer.

There can be some confusion about the small blind. Some (usually home) games treat the small blind as dead money that is pulled into the center pot. In a $10/$25 pot limit game, the small blind puts $10 into the pot before the cards are dealt. Using the dead money reasoning, the small blind would put another $25 into the pot to call the big blind, for a total of $35. The big blind might then check for $25, which would enable that player to win out of proportion to their wager.

This is not equitable; it's simple enough to consider that the small blind has made a half bet and must complete that bet for $15 to call, or raise, or fold for $10.

=== No limit ===
A game played with a no-limit betting structure allows each player to raise the bet by any amount up to and including their entire remaining stack at any time (subject to the table stakes rules and any other rules about raising). There is generally a minimum opening bet, and raises usually must be at least the amount of the previous raise.

=== Cap limit ===
Hands in a cap limit or "capped" structure are played exactly the same as in regular no limit or pot limit games until a pre-determined maximum per player is reached. Once the betting cap is reached, all players left in the hand are considered all-in, and the remaining cards dealt out with no more wagering.

For example, in a $1/$2 NL ($60 cap):

Player A bets $2. Player B raises to $10. Player C can then raise to a max of $60, and players A & B can call the $60 wager ($58 and $50 respectively). There would be no further wagering, and the winner would collect $180.

Cap limit games offer a similar action and strategy to no limit and pot limit games, but without risking an entire stack on a single hand.

== Table stakes rules ==
All casinos and most home games play poker by what are called table stakes rules, which state that each player starts each deal with a certain stake, and plays that deal with that stake. A player may not remove money from the table or add money from their pocket during the play of a hand. In essence, table stakes rules creates a maximum and a minimum buy-in amount for cash game poker as well as rules for adding and removing the stake from play. A player also may not take a portion of their money or stake off the table, unless they opt to leave the game and remove their entire stake from play. Players are not allowed to hide or misrepresent the amount of their stake from other players and must truthfully disclose the amount when asked.

In casino games, an exception is customarily made for de minimis amounts such as tips paid out of a player's stack.

Common among inexperienced players is the act of "going south" after winning a big pot, which is to take a portion of one's stake out of play, often as an attempt to hedge one's risk after a win. This is also known as "ratholing" or "reducing" and, while totally permissible in most other casino games, is not permitted in poker. If a player wishes to "hedge" after a win, the player must leave the table entirely—to do so immediately after winning a large pot is known as a "hit and run" and, although not prohibited, is generally considered in poor taste as the other players have no chance to "win some of it back".

In most casinos, once a player picks up their stack and leaves a table, they must wait a certain amount of time (usually an hour) before returning to a table with the same game and limits unless they buy in for the entire amount they left with. This is to prevent circumvention of the rule against "ratholing" by leaving the table after a large win only to immediately buy back in for a lesser amount.

Table stakes are the rule in most cash poker games because it allows players with vastly different bankrolls a reasonable amount of protection when playing with one another. They are usually set in relation to the blinds. For example, in a $1/2 No Limit cash game, the minimum stake is often set at $40 while maximum stake is often set at $200, or 20 and 100 big blinds respectively.

This also requires some special rules to handle the case when a player is faced with a bet that they cannot call with their available stake. In fixed-limit and spread-limit games, most casinos limit the number of raises per betting round. For example, a casino might limit raises to three or four, not including the opening bet.

=== "All-in" ===
A player faced with a current bet who wishes to call but has insufficient remaining stake (folding does not require special rules) may bet the remainder of their stake and declare themselves all-in. They may now hold onto their cards for the remainder of the deal as if they had called every bet, but may not win any more money from any player above the amount of their bet. In no-limit games, a player may also go all in, that is, betting their entire stack at any point during a betting round.

==== Side pots ====
A player who goes "all-in" effectively caps the main pot; the player is not entitled to win any amount from each player over their total stake. If only one other player is still in the hand, the other player simply matches the all-in (retracting any overage if necessary) and the hand is dealt to completion. However, if multiple players remain in the game and the bet rises beyond the all-in's stake, the overage goes into a side pot. Only the players who have contributed to the side pot have the chance to win it. In the case of multiple all-in bets, multiple side pots can be created. Players who choose to fold rather than match bets in the side pot are considered to fold with respect to the main pot as well.

For example, with three players in a game, Player A, with a large stack, opens the betting round for $20. Player B only has $10. They call the $10, going all-in. Player C has $30, and thus can either call the full $20, re-raise to $30, or fold. Player C decides to "raise all-in", betting their remaining stake. The bet is now $10 to Player A, who calls. Player A is the only player at the table with a remaining stake; they may not make any further bets this hand. Because Player B can only win $10 from each of the other two players' $30 bets, that $10 is taken from all players' bets and the $30 total is placed in the main pot. The $40 remaining, for which Players A and C are separately contesting, goes in a side pot. As no further bets can be made, the hand is now dealt to completion. It is found that Player B has the best hand overall, and wins the main pot. Player A has the second-best hand, and wins the side pot. Player C loses the hand, and must "re-buy" if they wish to be dealt in on subsequent hands.

There is a strategic advantage to being all-in: such a player cannot be bluffed, because they are entitled to hold their cards and see the showdown without risking any more money. Opponents who continue to bet after a player is all-in can still bluff each other out of the side pot, which is also to the all-in player's advantage since players who fold out of the side pot also reduce competition for the main pot. But these advantages are offset by the disadvantage that a player cannot win any more money than their stake can cover when they have the best hand, nor can an all-in player bluff other players on subsequent betting rounds when they do not have the best hand.

Some players may choose to buy into games with a "short stack", a stack of chips that is relatively small for the stakes being played, with the intention of going all-in after the flop and not having to make any further decisions. However, this is generally a non-optimal strategy in the long term, since the player does not maximize their gains on their winning hands.

==== All-in before the deal ====
If a player does not have sufficient money to cover the ante and blinds due, that player is automatically all-in for the coming hand. Any money the player holds must be applied to the ante first, and if the full ante is covered, the remaining money is applied towards the blind.

Some cardrooms require players in the big blind position to have at least enough chips to cover the small blind (and ante if applicable) in order to be dealt in. In cash games with such a rule, any player in the big blind with insufficient chips to cover the small blind will not be dealt in unless they re-buy. In tournaments with such a rule, any player in the big blind with insufficient chips to cover the small blind will be eliminated with their remaining chips being removed from play.

If a player is all in for part of the ante, or the exact amount of the ante, an equal amount of every other player's ante is placed in the main pot, with any remaining fraction of the ante and all blinds and further bets in the side pot.

If a player is all in for part of a blind, all antes go into the main pot. Players to act must call the complete amount of the big blind to call, even if the all-in player has posted less than a full big blind. At the end of the betting round, the bets and calls will be divided into the main pot and side pot as usual.

For example, Alice is playing at a table with 10 players in a tournament with an ante of $1 and blinds of $4/$8. Alice is due the big blind but she only has $8. She must pay the $1 ante and apply the remaining $7 towards the big blind, and she is all in. Dianne, next to act, calls $8, the full big blind amount. Carol raises to $16 total. All remaining players fold, the small blind folds, and Dianne folds. The amount in the main pot is $10 (the sum of all antes) plus the full $4 small blind since Alice had this amount covered, plus $7 from Alice and every other player who called at least that amount, namely Dianne and Carol. The main pot is therefore $10 + $4 + 3 × $7 = $35. The side pot of $10 ($1 in excess of Alice's all-in bet from Dianne, and $9 in excess of Alice's all-in bet from Carol) is paid immediately to Carol when Dianne folds.

==== Incomplete bet or raise ====
If a player goes all-in with a bet or raise rather than a call, another special rule comes into play. There are two options in common use: pot-limit and no-limit games usually use what is called the full bet rule, while fixed-limit and spread-limit games may use either the full bet rule or the half bet rule. The full bet rule states that if the amount of an all-in bet is less than the minimum bet, or if the amount of an all-in raise is less than the full amount of the previous raise, it does not constitute a "real" raise, and therefore does not reopen the betting action. The half bet rule states that if an all-in bet or raise is equal to or larger than half the minimum amount, it does constitute a raise and reopens the action.

For example, with the full bet rule in effect, a player opens the betting round for $20, and the next player has a total stake of $30. They may raise to $30, declaring themselves all-in, but this does not constitute a "real" raise, in the following sense: if a third player now calls the $30, and the first player's turn to act comes up, they may now call the additional $10, but they do not have the right to re-raise further. The all-in player's pseudo-raise was really just a call with some extra money, and the third player's call was just a call, so the initial opener's bet was simply called by both remaining players, closing the betting round (even though they must still equalize the money by putting in the additional $10). If the half bet rule were being used, then that raise would count as a genuine raise and the first player would be entitled to re-raise if they chose to (creating a side pot for the amount of their re-raise and the third player's call, if any).

In a game with a half bet rule, a player may complete an incomplete raise, if that player still has the right to raise (in other words, if that player has not yet acted in the betting round, or has not yet acted since the last full bet or raise). The act of completing a bet or raise reopens the betting to other remaining opponents.

For example, four players are in a hand, playing with a limit betting structure and a half bet rule. The current betting round is $20. Alice checks, and Dianne checks. Carol goes all-in for $5. Joane, still to act, has the following options: fold, call $5, or complete the bet to a total of $20. If Joane calls the $5, Alice and Dianne only have the option of calling or folding; neither can raise. But if Joane completes, either of them could raise.

==== Opening all-in hands ====
When all players in the pot are all-in, or one player is playing alone against opponents who are all all-in, no more betting can take place. Some casinos and many major tournaments require that all players still involved open, or immediately reveal, their hole cards in this case—the dealer will not continue dealing until all hands are flipped up. Likewise, any other cards that would normally be dealt face down, such as the final card in seven-card stud, may be dealt face-up. Such action is automatic in online poker. This rule discourages a form of tournament collusion called "chip dumping", in which one player deliberately loses their chips to another to give that player a greater chance of winning.

== Open stakes ==
The alternative to table stakes rules is called "open stakes", in which players are allowed to buy more chips during the hand and even to borrow money (often called "going light"). Open stakes are most commonly found in home or private games. In casinos, players are sometimes allowed to buy chips at the table during a hand, but are never allowed to borrow money or use IOUs. Other casinos, depending on protocol for buying chips, prohibit it as it slows gameplay considerably.

Open stakes is the older form of stakes rules, and before "all-in" betting became commonplace, a large bankroll meant an unfair advantage; raising the bet beyond what a player could cover in cash gave the player only two options; buy a larger stake (borrowing if necessary) or fold. This is commonly seen in period-piece movies such as Westerns, where a player bets personal possessions or even wagers property against another player's much larger cash bankroll.

In modern open-stakes rules, a player may go all in as in table stakes if they so choose, rather than adding to their stake or borrowing. Because it is a strategic advantage to go all in with some hands while being able to add to one's stake with others, such games may strictly enforce a minimum buy-in that is several times the maximum bet (or blinds, in the case of a no-limit or pot-limit game). A player who goes all in and wins a pot that is less than the minimum buy-in may not then add to their stake or borrow money during any future hand until they re-buy an amount sufficient to bring their stake up to a full buy-in.

If a player cannot or does not wish to go all-in, they may instead choose to buy chips with cash out-of-pocket at any time, even during the play of a hand, and their bets are limited only by the specified betting structure of the game.

Finally, a player may also borrow money by betting with an IOU, called a "marker", payable to the winner of the pot. To bet with a marker, all players still active in the pot must agree to accept the marker. Some clubs and house rules forbid IOUs altogether. If the marker is not acceptable, the bettor may bet with cash out-of-pocket or go all-in. A player may also borrow money from a player not involved in the pot, giving them a personal marker in exchange for cash or chips, which the players in the pot are then compelled to accept. A player may borrow money to call a bet during a hand, and later in the same hand go all-in due to further betting; but if a player borrows money to raise, they forfeit the right to go all-in later in that same hand—if they are re-raised, they must borrow money to call, or fold. A player may also buy more chips or be bought back in by any other player for any given amount at any given time.

Just as in table stakes, no player may remove chips or cash from the table once they are put in play (except small amounts for refreshments, tips, and such)—this includes all markers, whether one's own or those won from other players.

Players may agree before play on the means and time limits of settling markers, and a convenient amount below which all markers must be accepted to simplify play.

== See also ==
- Bluff (poker)
- Poker strategy
- Table limit
- Cheating in sports
- Doping in sport
