= Blind (poker) =

Type of bet in poker

One possible convention for blinds

Blinds are forced bets posted by players to the left of the dealer button in flop-style poker games. The number of blinds is usually two, but it can range from none to three. When there are two blinds they are called the small blind and the big blind.

== Overview ==
The small blind is placed by the player to the left of the dealer button and the big blind is then posted by the next player to the left. The one exception is when there are only two players (a "heads-up" game), when the player on the button (the dealer) is the small blind, and the other player is the big blind. (Both the player and the bet may be referred to as big or small blind.)

After the cards are dealt, the player to the left of the big blind is the first to act during the first betting round. If any players call the big blind, the big blind is then given an extra opportunity to raise. This is known as a live blind. If the live blind checks, the betting round then ends. After the flop, turn and river, the first person to act is the player seated to the left of the dealer position.

Generally, the big blind is equal to the minimum bet. The small blind is normally half the big blind. In cases where posting exactly half the big blind is impractical due to the big blind being some odd-valued denomination, the small blind is rounded (usually down) to the nearest practical value. For example, if the big blind in a live table game is $3, then the small blind will usually be $1 or $2 since most casinos do not distribute large quantities of $0.50 poker chips.

The blinds exist because Omaha and Texas hold 'em are frequently played without antes, allowing a player to fold their hand without placing a bet. The blind bets introduce a regular cost to take part in the game, thus inducing a player to enter pots in an attempt to compensate for that expense. The blinds are bets that start the betting process, and differ from antes in that regard.

It is possible to play without blinds. The minimum bet is then the lowest denomination chip in play, and tossing only one chip is considered as a call. Anything higher than that is considered a raise. Poker without blinds is usually played with everyone posting an ante to receive cards.

== Blinds in cash games ==
In cash games, otherwise known as ring games, blinds primarily serve to ensure all players are subject to some minimum, ongoing cost for participating in the game. This encourages players to play hands they otherwise might not, thereby increasing the average size of the pots and, by extension, increasing the amount of rake earned by the cardroom hosting the game.

In cash games, the amount of the blinds are normally fixed for each particular table and will not change for the duration of the game. However, many cardrooms will allow blind levels to change in cases where all players unanimously agree to a change. Larger cardrooms will often include tables with different blind levels to give players the option of playing at whatever stakes they are most comfortable with. In online poker, blinds range from as little as one U.S. cent to USD1,000 or more.

The minimum and maximum buy-in at a table is usually set in relation to the big blind. At live games, the minimum buy-in is usually between 50 and 80 big blinds, while the maximum buy-in is usually between 100 and 250 big blinds. Some online cardrooms offer short stack tables where the maximum buy-in is 50 big blinds or less and/or "deep stack" tables where the minimum buy-in is 100 big blinds or more.

=== Missed blinds ===
In cash games that do not deal cards to players who are absent from the table at the start of the hand (or, in online games, are designated as "sitting out"), special rules are necessary to deal with players who miss their blinds.

Players who miss their big blind will not be dealt in again until the button has passed them. At that point, the player must "super-post" (post both the big and small blinds) in order to rejoin the game and be dealt cards. Of these, only the big blind is considered "live" while the small blind is "dead"—it is placed in the center of the pot apart from the big blind and will not count towards calling any additional bets or raises by other players. If the player has only missed the small blind, then the same procedure applies except that the player only has to post the "dead" small blind to rejoin the game. Most cardrooms allow players to relieve themselves of these obligations if they wait until they are again due to post the big blind before rejoining the game.

Some cardrooms hosting live cash games do not allow players to miss their blinds in this manner. Rather, all players with chips on the table are dealt in whether or not they are present at the table. Any blinds due will be posted from the player's stack - depending on the cardroom's rules, this will be done either by the dealer, another cardroom employee or a nearby player under staff supervision. Players who do not return to the table by the time it is their turn to act are automatically folded.

== Blinds in tournament play ==
In poker tournament play, blinds serve a dual purpose. In addition to the purpose explained above, blinds are also used to control how long the tournament will last. Before the tournament begins, the players will agree to a blinds structure, usually set by the tournament organizer. This structure defines how long each round is and how much the blinds increase per round. Typically, they are increased at a smooth rate of between 25% and 50% per round over the previous round. As the blinds increase, players need to increase their chip counts (or "stacks") to stay in the game. The blinds will eventually consume all of a player's stack if they do not play to win more.

Unlike many cash games, it is not possible for a player to "miss" blinds in a tournament. If a player is absent from the table, they will continue to have their cards dealt and mucked and will have blinds and, if applicable, antes taken from his stack as they are due, either until they return or until their stack is completely consumed by blinds and antes. A player who loses their chips in this manner is said to have been "blinded off."

=== Goals ===
There are two main goals for the blinds structure:

1. Ensure that by the time the desired duration of the tournament is reached, it will be very hard for players with small stacks to stay in the game. This forces players with smaller stacks to play them aggressively, thus increasing their chip count or losing everything quickly.
2. Ensure that players, in general, do not have a large stack relative to the blind level.

If desired, antes can be added to further increase the pressure to win more chips.

=== Example ===
If each player in a tournament starts with 5,000 in chips and after four hours, the big blind is 10,000 (with a small blind of 5,000), a player with only 15,000 in chips would be able to stay in the game for at most one more rotation of the dealer button if they do not win any additional chips.

== See also ==
- Betting in poker § Blinds
