= Morton's theorem =

Poker principle

Morton's theorem is a poker principle articulated by Andy Morton in a Usenet poker newsgroup. It states that in multi-way pots, a player's expectation may be maximized by an opponent making a correct decision.

The most common application of Morton's theorem occurs when one player holds the best hand, but there are two or more opponents on draws. In this case, the player with the best hand might make more money in the long run when an opponent folds to a bet, even if that opponent is folding correctly and would be making a personal mistake to call the bet. This type of situation is sometimes referred to as implicit collusion.

Morton's theorem contrasts with the fundamental theorem of poker, which states that a player wants their opponents to make decisions which minimize their own expectation. The two theorems differ in the presence of more than one opponent: whereas the fundamental theorem always applies heads-up (one opponent), it does not always apply in multiway pots.

The scope of Morton's theorem in multi-way situations is a subject of controversy. Morton expressed the belief that his theorem is generically applicable in multi-way pots, so that the fundamental theorem rarely applies except for heads-up situations.

== An example ==
The following example is credited to Morton, who first posted a version of it on the Usenet newsgroup rec.gambling.poker.

Suppose in limit hold'em a player named Arnold holds A♦K♣ and the flop is K♠9♥3♥, giving him top pair with best kicker. When the betting on the flop is complete, Arnold has two opponents remaining, named Brenda and Charles. Arnold is certain that Brenda has the nut flush draw (for example A♥J♥, giving her 9 outs), and he believes that Charles holds second pair with a random kicker (for example Q♣9♣, 4 outs — not the Q♥). The rest of the deck results in a win for Arnold. The turn card is an apparent blank (for example 6♦) and the pot size at this point is P, expressed in big bets.

When Arnold bets the turn, Brenda, holding the flush draw, is sure to call and is almost certainly getting the correct pot odds to do so. Once Brenda calls, Charles must decide whether to call or fold. To figure out which action he should choose, we calculate his expectation in each case. This depends on the number of cards among the remaining 42 that will give him the best hand, and the current size of the pot. (Here, as in arguments involving the fundamental theorem, we assume that each player has complete information of their opponents' cards.)

$$\operatorname{E}\left[\mbox{ Charles }|\mbox{ folding }\right] = 0$$

$$\operatorname{E}\left[\mbox{ Charles }|\mbox{ calling }\right] = \frac{4}{42} \cdot (P+2) - \frac{38}{42} \cdot 1$$

Charles doesn't win or lose anything by folding. When calling, he wins the pot 4/42 of the time, and loses one big bet the remainder of the time. Setting these two expectations equal and solving for P lets us determine the pot size at which he is indifferent to calling or folding:

$$\operatorname{E}\left[\mbox{ Charles }|\mbox{ folding }\right] = \operatorname{E}\left[\mbox{ Charles }|\mbox{ calling }\right]$$
$$\Rightarrow P = 7.5 \mbox{ big bets }$$

When the pot is larger than this, Charles should continue; otherwise, it's in his best interest to fold.

To figure out which action on Charles' part Arnold would prefer, we calculate Arnold's expectation the same way:

$$\operatorname{E}\left[\mbox{ Arnold }|\mbox{ Charles folds }\right] = \frac{42-9}{42} \cdot (P+2) = \frac{33}{42} \cdot (P+2)$$

$$\operatorname{E}\left[\mbox{ Arnold }|\mbox{ Charles calls }\right] = \frac{42-9-4}{42} \cdot (P+3) = \frac{29}{42} \cdot (P+3)$$

Arnold's expectation depends in each case on the size of the pot (in other words, the pot odds Charles is getting when considering his call). Setting these two equal lets us calculate the pot size P where Arnold is indifferent whether Charles calls or folds:

$$\operatorname{E}\left[\mbox{ Arnold }|\mbox{ Charles calls }\right] = \operatorname{E}\left[\mbox{ Arnold }|\mbox{ Charles folds }\right]$$
$$\Rightarrow P = 5.25 \mbox{ big bets }$$

When the pot is smaller than this, Arnold profits when Charles is chasing, but when the pot is larger than this, Arnold's expectation is higher when Charles folds instead of chasing.

Hence, there is a range of pot sizes where both:

(a) it's correct for Charles to fold, and (b) Arnold makes more money when Charles (correctly) folds, than when he (incorrectly) chases.

This can be seen graphically below.

                              |
                C SHOULD FOLD | C SHOULD CALL
                              |
                              v
                     |
     WANTS C TO CALL | WANTS C TO FOLD
                     |
                     v
+---+---+---+---+---+---+---+---+---> pot size P in big bets
0   1   2   3   4   5   6   7   8
                     XXXXXXXXXX
                         ^
                "PARADOXICAL REGION"

The range of pot sizes marked with the X's is where Arnold wants Charles (C) to fold correctly, because he loses expectation when Charles calls incorrectly.

== Analysis ==
In essence, in the above example, when Charles calls in the "paradoxical region", he is paying too high a price for his weak draw, but Arnold is no longer the sole benefactor of that high price — Brenda is now taking Charles' money those times when Brenda makes her flush draw. Compared to the case where Arnold is heads up with Charles, Arnold still stands the risk of losing the whole pot, but he is no longer getting 100% of the compensation from Charles' loose calls.

It is the existence of this middle region of pot sizes, where a player wants at least some of their opponents to fold correctly, that explains the standard poker strategy of thinning the field as much as possible whenever a player thinks they hold the best hand. Even opponents with incorrect draws cost a player money when they call their bets, because part of these calls end up in the stacks of other opponents drawing against them.

Because Arnold is losing expectation from Charles' call, it follows that the aggregate of all other opponents (i.e., Brenda and Charles) must be gaining from Charles' call. In other words, if Brenda and Charles were to meet in the parking lot after the game and split their profits, they would have been colluding against Arnold. This is sometimes referred to as implicit collusion. It should be contrasted with what is sometimes called schooling. Schooling occurs when many opponents correctly call against a player with the best hand, whereas implicit collusion occurs when an opponent incorrectly calls against a player with the best hand.

One conclusion of Morton's theorem is that, in a loose hold'em game, the value of suited hands goes up because they are precisely the type of hand that will benefit from implicit collusion.

== See also ==
- Poker strategy
