= SitNGo Wizard =

Poker optimization tool

- Stable release: 1.0.1.212 / January 7, 2010
- Operating system: Microsoft Windows
- Type: Poker tools
- License: Proprietary
- Website: SitNGo Wizard Homepage

SitNGo Wizard (sometimes referred to as SNG Wizard) is a poker tool software program to aid online poker players in determining their optimal betting actions during the late stages of Sit and go poker contests.

== Details ==
PokerStars Game #37838600446: Tournament #229947010, $6.00+$0.50 USD Hold'em No Limit - Level VII (100/200) - 2010/01/08 10:55:44 ET
Table '229947010 1' 9-max Seat #7 is the button
Seat 2: Serge Claws (7400 in chips)
Seat 4: ElT007 (1345 in chips)
Seat 7: Jonesbravo (8518 in chips)
Seat 8: MR. DAO (6297 in chips)
Seat 9: SteveAHigh (3440 in chips)
Serge Claws: posts the ante 25
ElT007: posts the ante 25
Jonesbravo: posts the ante 25
MR. DAO: posts the ante 25
SteveAHigh: posts the ante 25
MR. DAO: posts small blind 100
SteveAHigh: posts big blind 200
*** HOLE CARDS ***
Dealt to ElT007 [9d 6d]
Serge Claws: folds
ElT007: folds
Jonesbravo: folds
MR. DAO: calls 100
SteveAHigh: checks
*** FLOP *** [2d 4d Ad]
MR. DAO: bets 200
SteveAHigh: folds
Uncalled bet (200) returned to MR. DAO
MR. DAO collected 525 from pot
*** SUMMARY ***
Total pot 525 | Rake 0
Board [2d 4d Ad]
Seat 2: Serge Claws folded before Flop (didn't bet)
Seat 4: ElT007 folded before Flop (didn't bet)
Seat 7: Jonesbravo (button) folded before Flop (didn't bet)
Seat 8: MR. DAO (small blind) collected (525)
Seat 9: SteveAHigh (big blind) folded on the Flop

The software enables players to load their hand histories so that they can get computerized feedback regarding their choices. It accepts both manual and downloaded entry of tournament situations for analysis. The software is not intended to be used in-game and many of its features become inoperable while an online poker client software program is active. For example, PokerStars lists it among its prohibited third party tools.

The software is based on the Independent Chip Model (ICM) and is in the class of software described as Automated Independent Chip Model (AICM). The program also uses Future Game Simulation Model. In addition to the user's hole card and table positions, the software uses number of opponents, stack sizes, and opponent calling ranges to calculate the optimal action. The software is capable of producing graphs to show the implications of varying an opponent's hand range. The game view feature contains a summary of the analysis and recommendation.

The software includes a quiz model that enables users to practice making push or fold decisions. The quiz mode serves as a type of poker flash card generator by creating random games for users to practice decision making. The quiz feature is customizeable with parameters for difficulty level, number of players, table position, and several other considerations.

== Critical review ==
The software is a substitute for having a poker coach in the sense that the software tells you what to do before and after games and reviews your performance to help you understand the mistakes you made. It is designed to help a user become better at making the right in-game decisions, which should improve the user's ability to compete in the current landscape of players who use software to improve their play, and thus improve the user's profitability. Some of the technical features are considered likely to be offputting to some users. Pokersoftware.com's review considered this to be the most powerful Poker AICM. The program is subject to some of the pitfalls of the ICM method, but it has the Future Game Simulation (FGS) feature that attempts to compensate for the downfall of the ICM method of short-stacking. The key advantage of the program is as an objective instructor of counterintuitive optimal play, which if learned will give a user an advantage over his/her untrained opponents.

The graphics are not considered impressive. There are additional cosmetic issues such as its interface and navigation options that weigh against the program's functionality.
