= PokerTracker =

Poker tool software company

- The basic tournament statistics view by description of a sample database in PokerTracker v4.06.
- Developers: PokerTracker Software, LLC
- Stable release: For Microsoft Windows: 4.11 (May 19, 2014); For Mac OS X: 4.11 (May 19, 2014)
- Operating system: Microsoft Windows & Mac OS X
- Type: Poker tools
- License: Proprietary
- Website: PokerTracker Homepage

PokerTracker Software, LLC is a poker tool software company that produces the PokerTracker line of poker tracking and analysis software. PokerTracker's software imports and parses the hand histories that poker sites create during online play and stores the resulting statistics/information about historical play into a local database library for self-analysis, and for in-game opponent analysis using a real-time Head-up display.

The software allows the user to monitor each poker session's profit or loss, hands played, time played, and table style. It calculates and graphs statistics such as hands per hour, winnings per hand, winnings per hour, cumulative profit and loss, and individual game profit and loss across multiple currencies.

== Products ==
The logo associated with PokerTracker 3

PokerTracker Software, LLC produces poker analysis software. Examples include PokerTracker Holdem v2, PokerTracker Omaha v2, PokerTracker 3 Hold'em (PT3) for Texas Hold 'em, PokerTracker 3 Omaha (PTO) for Omaha Hold 'em, PokerTracker Stud for Stud poker, and TableTracker. The company previously developed the PokerAce Head-Up Display, also known as PokerAce HUD or simply PAHUD, which provides real-time information for live online poker play; the functionality from this formerly separate application was eventually incorporated within PokerTracker 3. Collectively, the company's software has been described as "among the most comprehensive software programs in the online poker industry" by PokerSoftware.com. The company subsequently developed PokerTracker 4 in 2012 and 2013, which is its most recent software development.

=== PokerTracker 3 ===
The general info tab view of a sample database in PokerTracker Holdem v3.00 beta 29, including user customized columns such as final tables and highest percentile finish.

In September 2009, the company announced that as of March 31, 2010, PokerTracker Holdem v2 would no longer be supported. The decision was made because PokerTracker 3 had been released on May 15, 2008, nearly two years prior to the end-of-life date. The company felt that discontinuing support of v2 would avail resources which could be dedicated to improving PT3 and providing exceptional customer service. Similarly, on December 31, 2010, PokerTracker Omaha v2 would no longer be supported, as its features have been completely integrated into the PokerTracker 3 product line.

PokerTracker 3 supports online poker from the following poker networks and/or sites: 888 Poker Network, Bodog, Boss Media, Cake Network, Cereus Poker Network, Entraction Poker, Everest Poker, Full Tilt Poker, IPoker, Microgaming, Merge Gaming Network, OnGame, PartyPoker, PokerStars and Winamax. PokerTracker is available natively for both Microsoft Windows and Mac OS X-based computers.

PokerTracker 3 competes against several similar programs. According to Total Gambler, its most notable competitors are Hold'em Manager and PokerOffice, while Pokersoftware.com considers only Hold'em Manager to be a serious competitor.

=== PokerTracker 4 ===
PokerTracker 4 is poker tracking software that is designed for several types of online poker: No-Limit, Limit, or Pot-Limit cash games, Sit N' Go's and Multi-Table Tournaments for both Texas Holdem and Omaha players. It is compatible with almost all online poker websites' software and interfaces. PokerTracker 4 began public beta testing in March 2012. In August 2012, the company commercially launched a Microsoft Windows version of PokerTracker 4. In January 2013 as PokerTracker version 4.05.10 was rolled out, the company began alpha testing an Apple OS X version of the software. PokerTracker 4 was produced from scratch rather than by refining PokerTracker 3 and other earlier versions.

== Software features ==
On most online poker sites, players can have the client software create a locally stored text file that records the hand history as shown in the 'Sample Hand History' example. These hand histories summarize the details of the hand in a format that can be parsed by computer software. PokerTracker reads these files and extracts the relevant information, which it converts into a database for later review or statistical analysis. The software is capable of combining hand history details of multiple accounts from different online poker services, which allows a user to aggregate their data. Statistical summaries can be consolidated from different poker sites regardless of whether the user's screen name is the same at each site.

PokerTracker is capable of analyzing cash ring games in which players play for cash during each hand, sit and go tournaments in which players compete for set prizes after the prescribed number of competitors join the tournament, and multi-table tournaments in which players compete for tournament prizes based on the total number of entries at the scheduled start time. Statistics can be tracked by position, session, tournament, best & worst hands, and hand results. This helps the user analyze statistics based on starting hand or final hand. The software also enables the user to replay any specific hand.

PokerTracker's probability graphs, as well as historical statistics of the hands a user and their opponents have played, enable the user to analyze conditional statistical possibilities and optimal betting amounts. The situations it analyzes are conditional on the opposition's playing characteristics and the player's position relative to the dealer. Graphs can be produced for a single session or for any part of one's playing history. One of the biggest improvements in PokerTracker 3 over PT2 is that it is fully customizable so that all statistics and reports can be tailored to the individual user. The Guardian claims most serious players use PokerTracker during online play to constantly calculate situational optima.

PokerTracker 3 version v3.00 beta 29 Profit graph

PokerTracker 3 is also known for its integrated heads-up display, a transparent video overlay data presentation that makes statistics and notes are readily available during play. The HUD allows an online poker player to focus his attention on the poker table he or she is playing at, rather than on the PokerTracker application. The HUD provides a vast array of realtime statistics for in-game analysis, customizable to the user's preference. In addition to the statistics available constantly during play on the poker window, detailed statistics are available in a pop-up window, accessible via a single mouse click. Marbella Slim of the Daily Star used the vision of Arnold Schwarzenegger's Terminator character in an analogy with the HUD: "In some scenes, you get to see what the robot Terminator is seeing and he has all these data streams in front of his vision - it's a HUD or a head-up display." Unlike other poker tracking products, PokerTracker 3 includes a HUD as part of the basic program. The PT3 HUD, which automatically overlays a player's opponents' statistics next to their avatars, is essentially a built-in version of the formerly available PokerAce HUD.

PokerTracker v2 will no longer be supported after March 31, 2010.

PokerTracker 3 also offers a monthly subscription-based service called TableTracker. TableTracker is an integrated service that automatically identifies ring tables with competition suitable to the user's playing style. PokerTracker's servers constantly monitor which players are playing and what tables they are playing at on various major poker sites, which allows TableTracker to find the weakest players across multiple online poker websites. The user can search based on the software's built in scoring system or any other statistics of their choosing.

== Use and legality ==
PokerTracker 3 includes a HUD overlay as seen in this PokerStars online poker session

Serious poker pros and casual amateurs can benefit from the poker tracking software, and poker magazines such as Card Player repeatedly remind poker players of the usefulness of tracking software. Total Gambler says that in addition to experience and skill the other necessity for a gambler to become a professional poker player is a good software package such as PokerTracker.

Several websites portray PokerTracker as either the world's leading or the world's most popular poker tracking software. For example, Pokersource.com describes it as "the most popular poker tracking and analysis software available" and Party Poker describes PokerTracker as "the original and largest piece of poker tracking software". PokerSoftware.com says "Poker Tracker has been the industry standard ... for years". Total Gambler says that for more than a two-year period PokerTracker 2 was the "prominent force in online poker tracking", but at the time of its December 2008 review it speaks of this leadership position in the past tense, noting that PT3 had not yet been "fully released" at the time of its testing.

Major online card rooms forbid the use of software that gives a player an "unfair advantage." This typically includes software that allows players to share their hole cards with other players during live play and software that automates decision making. Since PokerTracker software doesn't fit into either of these categories it is generally allowed on most sites, including industry leader PokerStars.com. Legality aside, some players feel the use of PokerTracker takes away from the game; for example, Victoria Coren of The Guardian remarks "there is only one downside [to using PokerTracker]. Where's the bloody fun in it?"
