= Value (poker) =

Poker terminology

In poker, the strength of a hand (how likely it is to be the best according to the rules of the game being played) is often called its value; however, in the context of poker strategy the term is more often used to describe a betting tactic, a value bet. This bet (or raise) is intended to increase the size of the pot, by inducing opponents to call. A value bet is in contrast to a bluff or a protection bet (though some bets may have a combination of these motives).

For a value bet to be correct, a player must have a positive expectation, that is, they will win more than one bet for every bet they put in the pot. Pot odds do not matter in this situation, because the factor here is whether it is more profitable to raise or call, rather than to call or fold. Betting for value can apply to both made hand and drawing hand situations, although in the latter situation it is less often correct, as the drawing hand's chances of winning are generally lower. Many made hands will win the pot more than 50% of the time, therefore a value bet is usually correct, even heads up.

For example, in a game of Texas hold 'em, a player with 8♣ 6♠ and a flop of 9♥ 7♦ 2♣ has an open-ended straight draw and so has eight outs (four 10s and four 5s). With 47 unknown cards, the player will make the straight approximately one time for every five times they don't, so betting is profitable if six or more of their opponents will call the bet (they will win once (+6 bets) and lose five times (-5 bets) out of every six hands like this, resulting in an expectation of +1 bet). If they think that fewer than six opponents will call the bet, they would be losing money by betting and should simply check instead.

== See also ==
- Poker strategy
- Betting (poker)
