= Bluff (poker) =

Tactic in poker and other card games

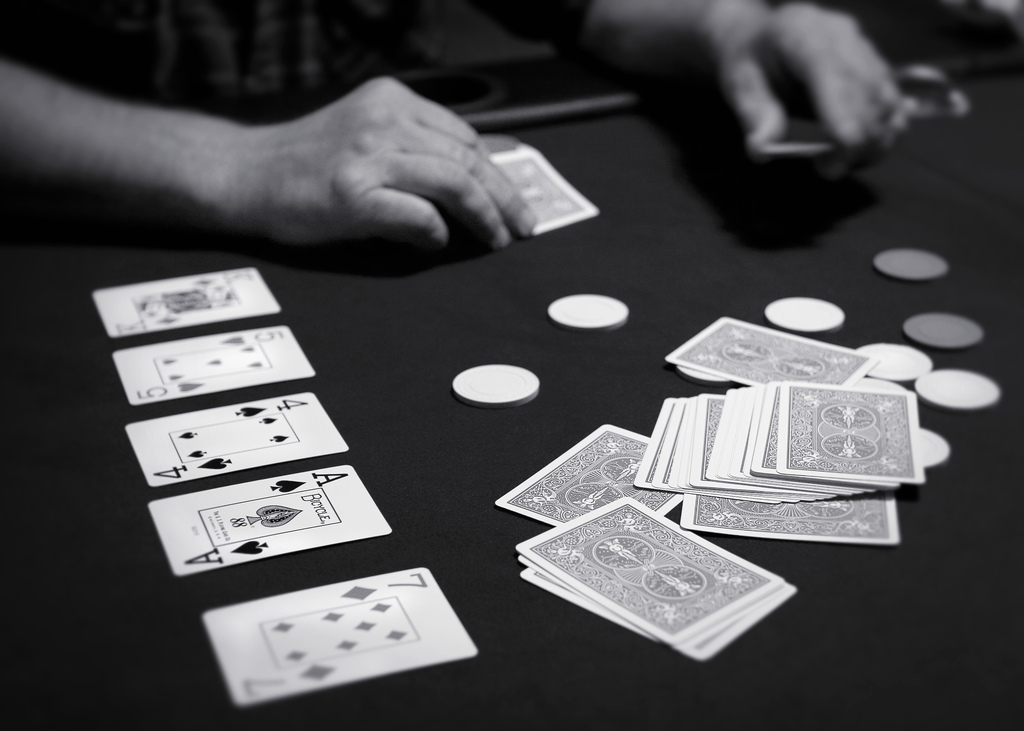
A game of Texas hold 'em in progress. "Hold 'em" is a popular form of poker.

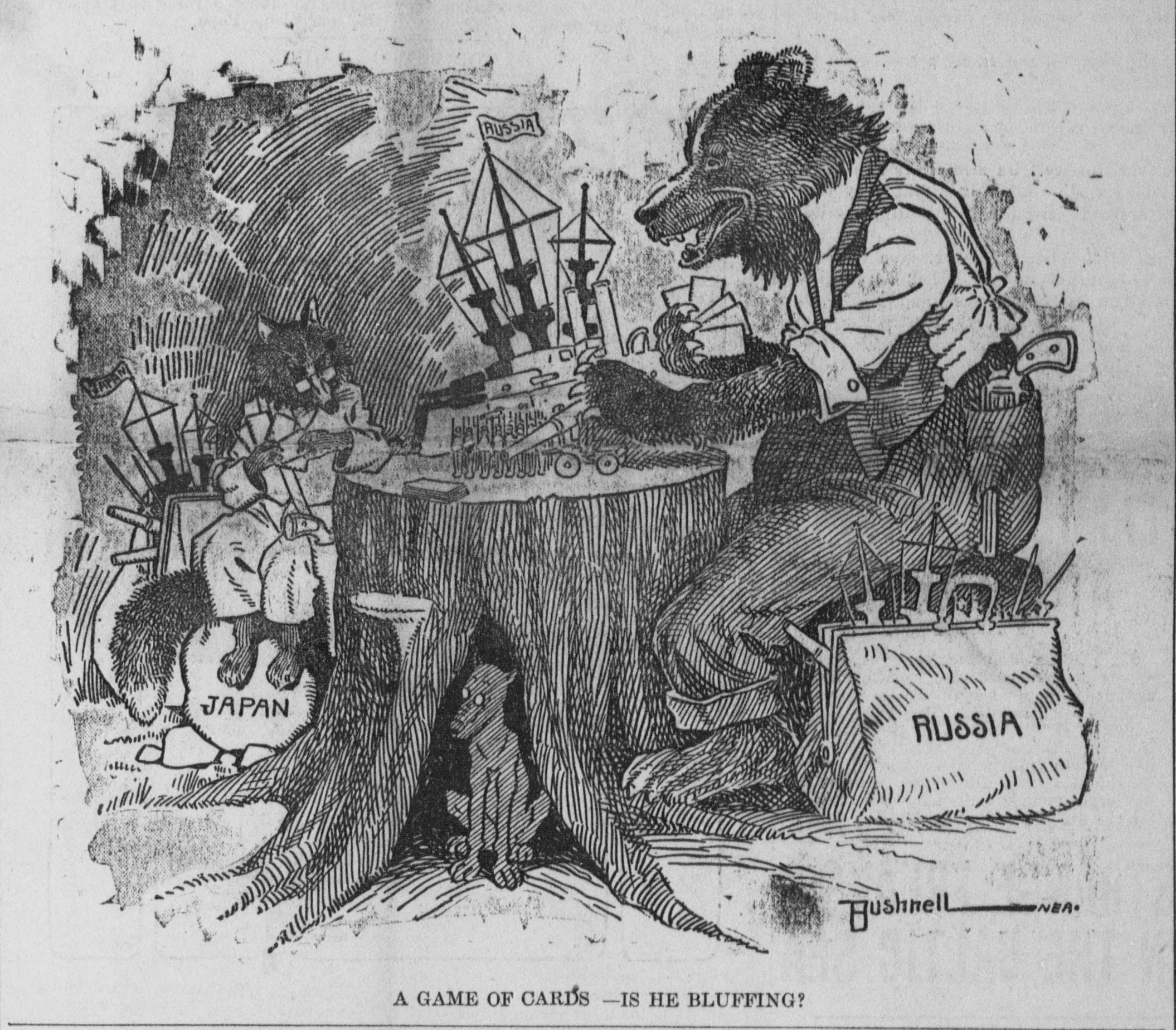
In this 1904 cartoon by E. A. Bushnell, the Russian Empire (represented by a bear) and the Empire of Japan (represented by a fox) play poker, with their respective arsenals as stakes. Both wonder if the other is bluffing. The Russo-Japanese War began 17 days later.

In the card game of poker, a bluff is a bet or raise made with a hand which is not thought to be the best hand. To bluff is to make such a bet. The objective of a bluff is to induce a fold by at least one opponent who holds a better hand. The size and frequency of a bluff determines its profitability to the bluffer. By extension, the phrase "calling somebody's bluff" is often used outside the context of poker to describe situations where one person demands that another proves a claim, or proves that they are not being deceptive.

== Pure bluff ==
A pure bluff, or stone-cold bluff, is a bet or raise with an inferior hand that has little or no chance of improving. A player making a pure bluff believes they can win the pot only if all opponents fold. The pot odds for a bluff are the ratio of the size of the bluff to the pot. A pure bluff has a positive expectation (will be profitable in the long run) when the probability of being called by an opponent is lower than the pot odds for the bluff.

For example, suppose that after all the cards are out, a player holding a busted drawing hand decides that the only way to win the pot is to make a pure bluff. If the player bets the size of the pot on a pure bluff, the bluff will have a positive expectation if the probability of being called is less than 50%. Note, however, that the opponent may also consider the pot odds when deciding whether to call. In this example, the opponent will be facing 2-to-1 pot odds for the call. The opponent will have a positive expectation for calling the bluff if the opponent believes the probability the player is bluffing is at least 33%.

== Semi-bluff ==
In games with multiple betting rounds, to bluff on one round with an inferior or drawing hand that might improve in a later round is called a semi-bluff. A player making a semi-bluff can win the pot two different ways: by all opponents folding immediately or by catching a card to improve the player's hand. In some cases a player may be on a draw but with odds strong enough that they are favored to win the hand. In this case their bet is not classified as a semi-bluff even though their bet may force opponents to fold hands with better current strength.

For example, a player in a stud poker game with four spade-suited cards showing (but none among their downcards) on the penultimate round might raise, hoping that their opponents believe the player already has a flush. If their bluff fails and they are called, the player still might be dealt a spade on the final card and win the showdown (or they might be dealt another non-spade and try to bluff again, in which case it is a pure bluff on the final round rather than a semi-bluff).

== Bluffing circumstances ==
Bluffing may be more effective in some circumstances than others. Bluffs have a higher expectation when the probability of being called decreases. Several game circumstances may decrease the probability of being called (and increase the profitability of the bluff):

- Fewer opponents who must fold to the bluff.
- The bluff provides less favorable pot odds to opponents for a call.
- A scare card comes that increases the number of superior hands that the player may be perceived to have.
- The player's betting pattern in the hand has been consistent with the superior hand they are representing with the bluff.
- The opponent's betting pattern suggests the opponent may have a marginal hand that is vulnerable to a greater number of potential superior hands.
- The opponent's betting pattern suggests the opponent may have a drawing hand and the bluff provides unfavorable pot odds to the opponent for chasing the draw.
- Opponents are not irrationally committed to the pot (see sunk cost fallacy).
- Opponents are sufficiently skilled and paying sufficient attention.

The opponent's current state of mind should be taken into consideration when bluffing. Under certain circumstances external pressures or events can significantly impact an opponent's decision making skills.

== Optimal bluffing frequency ==
If a player bluffs too infrequently, observant opponents will recognize that the player is betting for value and will call with very strong hands or with drawing hands only when they are receiving favorable pot odds. If a player bluffs too frequently, observant opponents snap off their bluffs by calling or re-raising. Occasional bluffing disguises not just the hands a player is bluffing with, but also their legitimate hands that opponents may think they may be bluffing with. David Sklansky, in his book The Theory of Poker, states "Mathematically, the optimal bluffing strategy is to bluff in such a way that the chances against your bluffing are identical to the pot odds your opponent is getting."

Optimal bluffing also requires that the bluffs must be performed in such a manner that opponents cannot tell when a player is bluffing or not. To prevent bluffs from occurring in a predictable pattern, game theory suggests the use of a randomizing agent to determine whether to bluff. For example, a player might use the colors of their hidden cards, the second hand on their watch, or some other unpredictable mechanism to determine whether to bluff.

The purpose of optimal bluffing frequencies is to make the opponent (mathematically) indifferent between calling and folding. Optimal bluffing frequencies are based upon game theory and the Nash equilibrium, and assist the player using these strategies to become unexploitable. By bluffing in optimal frequencies, you will typically end up breaking even on your bluffs (in other words, optimal bluffing frequencies are not meant to generate positive expected value from the bluffs alone). Rather, optimal bluffing frequencies allow you to gain more value from your value bets, because your opponent is indifferent between calling or folding when you bet (regardless of whether it is a value bet or a bluff bet).

== Bluffing in other games ==
Although bluffing is most often considered a poker term, similar tactics are useful in other games as well. In these situations, a player makes a play that should not be profitable unless an opponent misjudges it as being made from a position capable of justifying it. Since a successful bluff requires deceiving one's opponent, it occurs only in games in which the players conceal information from each other. In games like chess and backgammon, both players can see the same board and so should simply make the best legal move available. Examples include:

- Contract Bridge: Psychic bids and falsecards are attempts to mislead the opponents about the distribution of the cards. A risk (common to all bluffing in partnership games) is that a bluff may also confuse the bluffer's partner. Psychic bids serve to make it harder for the opponents to find a good contract or to accurately place the key missing cards with a defender. Falsecarding (a tactic available in most trick taking card games) is playing a card that would naturally be played from a different hand distribution in hopes that an opponent will wrongly assume that the falsecarder made a natural play from a different hand and misplay a later trick on that assumption.
- Stratego: Much of the strategy in Stratego revolves around identifying the ranks of the opposing pieces. Therefore, depriving your opponent of this information is valuable. In particular, the "Shoreline Bluff" involves placing the flag in an unnecessarily-vulnerable location in the hope that the opponent will not look for it there. It is also common to bluff an attack that one would never actually make by initiating pursuit of a piece known to be strong, with an as-yet unidentified but weaker piece. Until the true rank of the pursuing piece is revealed, the player with the stronger piece might retreat if their opponent does not pursue them with a weaker piece. That might buy time for the bluffer to bring in a faraway piece that can actually defend against the bluffed piece.
- Spades: In late game situations, it is useful to bid a nil even if it cannot succeed. If the third seat bidder sees that making a natural bid would allow the fourth seat bidder to make an uncontestable bid for game, they may bid nil even if it has no chance of success. The last bidder then must choose whether to make their natural bid (and lose the game if the nil succeeds) or to respect the nil by making a riskier bid that allows their side to win even if the doomed nil is successful. If the player chooses wrong and both teams miss their bids, the game continues.
- Scrabble: Scrabble players will sometimes deliberately play an invalid "phony" word in the hope the opponent does not challenge it, and allows them to score for it. Bluffing in Scrabble is a bit different from the other examples. Scrabble players conceal their tiles but have little opportunity to make significant deductions about their opponent's tiles (except in the endgame) and even less opportunity to spread disinformation about them. Bluffing by playing a phony is instead based on assuming players have imperfect knowledge of the acceptable word list.

== Artificial intelligence ==
Evan Hurwitz and Tshilidzi Marwala developed a software agent that bluffed while playing a poker-like game. They used intelligent agents to design agent outlooks. The agent was able to learn to predict its opponents' reactions based on its own cards and the actions of others. By using reinforcement neural networks, the agents were able to learn to bluff without prompting.

== Economic theory ==
In economics, bluffing has been explained as rational equilibrium behavior in games with information asymmetries. For instance, consider the hold-up problem, a central ingredient of the theory of incomplete contracts. There are two players. Today player A can make an investment; tomorrow player B offers how to divide the returns of the investment. If player A rejects the offer, they can realize only a fraction x<1 of these returns on their own. Suppose player A has private information about x. Goldlücke and Schmitz (2014) have shown that player A might make a large investment even if player A is weak (i.e., when they know that x is small). The reason is that a large investment may lead player B to believe that player A is strong (i.e., x is large), so that player B will make a generous offer. Hence, bluffing can be a profitable strategy for player A.

== See also ==
- Poker jargon
- Slow play
