= Pot odds =

Poker term

In poker, pot odds are the ratio of the current size of the pot to the cost of a contemplated call. Pot odds are compared to the odds of winning a hand with a future card in order to estimate the call's expected value. The purpose of this is to statistically guide a player's decision between the options of call or fold. Raising is an alternative to place this decision on the opponent.

== Calculating equity ==
Pot odds are only useful if a player has enough equity. Equity is the chance a player has to win the hand at showdown. It is calculated as the fraction of remaining cards in the deck for each remaining street (sequential card being dealt, e.g. turn, river) that can give a player the winning hand. For example, in Texas hold'em, if a player has an inside straight draw on the flop, there are four remaining cards in the deck, or outs, that can give them a straight on the turn or the river. The addition law of probability combines the chances of making the straight on the turn (4/47 = 8.5%) and on the river (4/46 = 8.7%) to give the player an equity of 17.2%, assuming no other cards will give them a winning hand. Calculating equity makes an assumption of the opponents hand. If the opponent holds blockers (outs that the player needs to make their hand), then the player's equity is lower than what is calculated from assuming all outs remain in the deck. While this may be a lot for a player to consider in the moment, calculating equity can be simplified with the rule of two and four.

=== Rule of two and four ===
When playing against a clock, calculating odds and percentages under pressure can be challenging. To facilitate this, the rule of two and four can be used. It is an estimate of equity. The player's number of outs are multiplied with double the amount of remaining streets. Using the example from before, the player had 4 outs with two streets to come. 4 outs multiplied by 4 (double the amount of remaining streets) gives an estimated equity of 16%. Compared to the actual equity of 17.2%, this estimation is close enough for games such as Texas hold'em where bet sizes are usually kept to less than or equal to 100% of the pot, where the relative pot odds have a large enough margin of error for the player to meet with their calculated equity.

== Converting odds ratios to and from percentages ==
Odds are most commonly expressed as ratios, but they are not useful when comparing to equity percentages for poker. The ratio has two numbers: the size of the pot and the cost of the call. To convert this ratio to the equivalent percentage, the cost of the call is divided by the sum of these two numbers. For example, the pot is $30, and the cost of the call is $10. The pot odds in this situation are 30:10, or 3:1 when simplified. To get the percentage, 1 is divided by the sum of 3 and 1, giving 0.25, or 25% or 1/(3+1).

To convert any percentage or fraction to the equivalent odds, the numerator is subtracted from the denominator. The difference is compared to the numerator as a ratio. For example, to convert 25%, or 1/4, 1 is subtracted from 4 to get 3. The resulting ratio is 3:1.

== Using pot odds to determine expected value ==
When a player holds a drawing hand (a hand that is behind now but is likely to win if a certain card is drawn) pot odds are used to determine the expected value of that hand when the player is faced with a bet.

The expected value of a call is determined by comparing the pot odds to the odds of drawing a hand that wins at showdown. If the odds of drawing a desired hand are better than the pot odds (e.g. 3:1 drawing odds against 4:1 pot odds), the call has a positive expected value. The law of large numbers predicts the player will profit in the long run if they continue to call with advantageous pot odds. The opposite is true if the player continues to call with disadvantageous pot odds.

=== Example (Texas hold'em) ===
Alice holds 5-4 of clubs. The board on the turn is Queen of clubs, Jack of clubs, 9 of diamonds, and 7 of hearts. Her hand will almost certainly not win at showdown unless one of the 9 remaining clubs comes on the river to give her a flush. Excluding her two hole cards and the four community cards, there are 46 remaining cards to draw from. This gives a probability of 9/46 (19.6%). The rule of 2 and 4 estimates Alice's equity at 18%. The approximate equivalent odds of hitting her flush are 4:1. Her opponent bets $10, so that the total pot now becomes, say, $50. This gives Alice pot odds of 5:1. The odds of her hitting her flush are better than her pot odds, so she should call.

==== Validity of strategy ====
Using pot odds involves making assumptions about the opponent's hand. When calculating the odds of Alice drawing her flush, it was assumed that her opponent did not hold any of the remaining clubs. It was also assumed that her opponent did not have two-pair or a set. In these cases, her opponent could have been drawing on a higher flush, a full house, or four of a kind, all of which would win even if Alice made her flush. This is where considering the range of an opponent's hands becomes important. If, for example, Alice's opponent raised multiple times preflop, it would be more likely that they have a stronger drawing hand, such as Ace-King of clubs, by the time the turn came.

Pot odds are just one aspect of a sound strategy for poker based on game theory. The purpose of using game theory in poker is to make a player indifferent to how their opponent plays. It should not matter if the opponent is passive or aggressive, tight or loose. Pot odds can help the player make more mathematically based decisions, as opposed to playing exploitatively where the player guesses their opponent's decisions based on certain behaviors.

== Implied pot odds ==
Implied pot odds, or simply implied odds, are calculated the same way as pot odds, but take into consideration estimated future betting. Implied odds are calculated in situations where the player expects to fold in the following round if the draw is missed, thereby losing no additional bets, but expects to gain additional bets when the draw is made. Since the player expects to always gain additional bets in later rounds when the draw is made, and never lose any additional bets when the draw is missed, the extra bets that the player expects to gain, excluding their own, can fairly be added to the current size of the pot. This adjusted pot value is known as the implied pot.

=== Example (Texas hold'em) ===
On the turn, Alice's hand is certainly behind, and she faces a $1 call to win a $10 pot against a single opponent. There are four cards remaining in the deck that make her hand a certain winner. Her probability of drawing one of those cards is therefore 4/47 (8.5%), which when converted to odds is 10.75:1. Since the pot lays 10:1 (9.1%), Alice will on average lose money by calling if there is no future betting. However, Alice expects her opponent to call her additional $1 bet on the final betting round if she makes her draw. Alice will fold if she misses her draw and thus lose no additional bets. Alice's implied pot is therefore $11 ($10 plus the expected $1 call to her additional $1 bet), so her implied pot odds are 11:1 (8.3%). Her call now has a positive expectation.

== Reverse implied pot odds ==
Reverse implied pot odds, or simply reverse implied odds, apply to situations where a player will win the minimum if holding the best hand but lose the maximum if not having the best hand. Aggressive actions (bets and raises) are subject to reverse implied odds, because they win the minimum if they win immediately (the current pot), but may lose the maximum if called (the current pot plus the called bet or raise). These situations may also occur when a player has a made hand with little chance of improving what is believed to be currently the best hand, but an opponent continues to bet. An opponent with a weak hand will be likely to give up after the player calls and not call any bets the player makes. An opponent with a superior hand, will, on the other hand, continue, (extracting additional bets or calls from the player).

=== Limit Texas hold'em example ===
With one card to come, Alice holds a made hand with little chance of improving and faces a $10 call to win a $30 pot. If her opponent has a weak hand or is bluffing, Alice expects no further bets or calls from her opponent. If her opponent has a superior hand, Alice expects the opponent to bet another $10 on the end. Therefore, if Alice wins, she only expects to win the $30 currently in the pot, but if she loses, she expects to lose $20 ($10 call on the turn plus $10 call on the river). Because she is risking $20 to win $30, Alice's reverse implied pot odds are 1.5-to-1 ($30/$20) or 40 percent (1/(1.5+1)). For calling to have a positive expectation, Alice must believe the probability of her opponent having a weak hand is over 40 percent.

== Manipulating pot odds ==
Often a player will bet to manipulate the pot odds offered to other players. A common example of manipulating pot odds is to make a bet to protect a made hand that discourages opponents from chasing a drawing hand.

=== No-limit Texas hold 'em example ===
With one card to come, Bob has a made hand, but the board shows a potential flush draw. According to the Fundamental theorem of poker, Bob wants to bet enough for an opponent with a flush draw to incorrectly call, but Bob does not want to bet more than he has to in the event the opponent already has him beat.

Assuming a $20 pot and one opponent, if Bob bets $10 (half the pot), when his opponent acts, the pot will be $30 and it will cost $10 to call. The opponent's pot odds will be 3-to-1, or 25 percent. If the opponent is on a flush draw (9/46, approximately 19.565 percent or 4.11-to-1 odds against with one card to come), the pot is not offering adequate pot odds for the opponent to call unless the opponent thinks they can induce additional final round betting from Bob if the opponent completes their flush draw (see implied pot odds).

A bet of $6.43, resulting in pot odds of 4.11-to-1, would make his opponent mathematically indifferent to calling if implied odds are disregarded.

== Bluffing frequency ==
According to David Sklansky, game theory shows that a player should bluff a percentage of the time equal to his opponent's pot odds to call the bluff. For example, in the final betting round, if the pot is $30 and a player is contemplating a $30 bet (which will give his opponent 2-to-1 pot odds for the call), the player should bluff half as often as he would bet for value (one out of three times).

Slanksy notes that this conclusion does not take into account some of the context of specific situations. A player's bluffing frequency often accounts for many different factors, particularly the tightness or looseness of their opponents. Bluffing against a tight player is more likely to induce a fold than bluffing against a loose player, who is more likely to call the bluff. His strategy is an equilibrium strategy in the sense that it is optimal against someone playing an optimal strategy against it; no lesser strategy can beat it (though another strategy may beat the lesser strategy by more).

== See also ==
- List of poker terms
- Poker strategy
- Poker probability
