= Open-ended (poker) =

Poker gameplay and terminology situation

Open-ended refers to a situation in poker where the player has four of five cards needed for a straight that can be completed at either end. For example, a player with 3♥ 4♥ 5♣ 6♠ is open-ended, because a deuce or a seven would give the player a straight. This situation is also called an outside straight draw or double-ended straight draw as the cards needed to complete the straight are cards which are on the outside (both ends) of the current hand, as opposed to an inside draw such as 2♦ 3♠ 4♠ 6♥ or A♣ 2♣ 3♣ 4♦, which can only be completed by a five. The term originated with draw poker but is also used in games like Texas hold'em.

Seven-card games like Texas hold'em and stud also allow the possibility of double belly-buster draws, also called double-inside or two-way draws, which, like an inside draw, a card is needed within a series to fill. But unlike simple inside draws, two ranks can fill the hand. An example of this is A♥ 3♥ 4♣ 5♠7♣, in which a deuce fills the inside straight A2345, and a six would fill the inside straight 34567.

These terms are also used for straight flush draws. 2♥ 3♥ 4♥ 5♥ is a straight-flush draw, since A♥ and 6♥ will create straight flushes. Such hands are optimal drawing hands, since the player has up to fifteen outs (nine cards remaining in the suit, six cards which complete the straight but not the flush).

== See also ==
- Glossary of poker terms
- List of poker hands
- Poker strategy
