= Effective hand strength algorithm =

Poker algorithm published in 1998

Effective Hand Strength (EHS) is a poker algorithm conceived by computer scientists Darse Billings, Denis Papp, Jonathan Schaeffer and Duane Szafron that was published for the first time in the research paper (1998). "Opponent Modeling in Poker" (PDF). AAAI-98 Proceedings.

It has since then been considered as a reference in the realm of poker artificial intelligence and has been the basis of further research such as:

- Rubin, Jonathan; Watson, Ian (April 2011). "Computer poker: A review" (PDF). Artificial Intelligence. 175 (5–6): 958–987. doi:10.1016/j.artint.2010.12.005.
- Schuijtvlot, Erwin (2011). Application of AI in poker (PDF) (Master's thesis). Vrije Universiteit Amsterdam. pp. 12–13. Archived from the original (PDF) on 2019-05-22.
- Advances in Artificial Intelligence - SBIA 2008. 2008. pp. 85–86. doi:10.1007/978-3-540-88190-2.

== Algorithm ==
The algorithm is a numerical approach to quantify the strength of a poker hand where its result expresses the strength of a particular hand in percentile (i.e. ranging from 0 to 1), compared to all other possible hands. The underlying assumption is that an Effective Hand Strength (EHS) is composed of the current Hand Strength (HS) and its potential to improve or deteriorate (PPOT and NPOT):

$$EHS = HS \times (1 - NPOT) + (1-HS) \times PPOT$$

where:

- $EHS$ is the Effective Hand Strength
- $HS$ is the current Hand Strength (i.e. not taking into account potential to improve or deteriorate, depending on upcoming table cards
- $NPOT$ is the Negative POTential (i.e. the probability that our current hand, if the strongest, deteriorates and becomes a losing hand)
- $PPOT$ is the Positive POTential (i.e. the probability that our current hand, if losing, improves and becomes the winning hand)

== Pseudocode ==
Hand Strength (HS) will enumerate all possible opponent hand cards and count the occurrences where our hand is strongest (+50% of the cases where we are tied):

HandStrength(ourcards, boardcards) {
    ahead = tied = behind = 0
    ourrank = Rank(ourcards, boardcards)

    for each case(oppcards) {
        opprank = Rank(oppcards, boardcards)
        if (ourrank > opprank) ahead += 1
        else if (ourrank == opprank) tied += 1
        else behind += 1
    }

    handstrength = (ahead + tied / 2) / (ahead + tied + behind)

    return handstrength
}

In addition, EHS will consider the hand potential (i.e. its probabilities to improve or deteriorate):

HandPotential(ourcards, boardcards) {
    // Hand potential array, each index represents ahead, tied, and behind
    integer array HP[3][3] // initialize to 0
    integer array HPTotal[3] // initialize to 0
    ourrank = Rank(ourcards, boardcards)

    // Consider all two card combinations of the remaining cards for the opponent
    for each case(oppcards) {
        opprank = Rank(oppcards, boardcards)
        if (ourrank > opprank) index = ahead
        else if (ourrank == opprank) index = tied
        else index = behind
        HPTotal[index] += 1

        // All possible board cards to come
        for each case(turn, river) {
            // Final 5-card board
            board = [boardcards, turn, river]
            ourbest = Rank(ourcards, board)
            oppbest = Rank(oppcards, board)
            if (ourbest > oppbest) HP[index][ahead] += 1
            else if (ourbest == oppbest) HP[index][tied] += 1
            else HP[index][behind] += 1
        }
    }

    // Ppot: were behind but moved ahead
    Ppot = (HP[behind][ahead] + HP[behind][tied] / 2 + HP[tied][ahead] / 2) / (HPTotal[behind] + HPTotal[tied])
    // Npot: were ahead but fell behind
    Npot = (HP[ahead][behind] + HP[tied][behind] / 2 + HP[ahead][tied] / 2) / (HPTotal[ahead] + HPTotal[tied])

    return [ Ppot, Npot ]
}

== Applicability ==
EHS is applicable to a wide variety of poker games such as Texas hold 'em poker, Omaha hold 'em poker, ...

Given the complexity of the algorithm, it can not be computed manually and has to be used in an Artificial Intelligence context.
