= Out (poker) =

Poker card

In a poker game with more than one betting round, an out is any unseen card that, if drawn, will improve a player's hand to one that is likely to win. Knowing the number of outs a player has is an important part of poker strategy. For example, in draw poker, a hand with four diamonds has nine outs to make a flush: there are 13 diamonds in the deck, and four of them have been seen. If a player has two small pairs, and he believes that it will be necessary for him to make a full house to win, then he has four outs: the two remaining cards of each rank that he holds.

One's number of outs is often used to describe a drawing hand: "I had a two-outer" meaning you had a hand that only two cards in the deck could improve to a winner, for example. In draw poker, one also hears the terms "12-way" or "16-way" straight draw for hands such as 6♥ 7♥ 8♠ (Joker), in which any of sixteen cards (4 fours, 4 fives, 4 nines, 4 tens) can fill a straight.

The number of outs can be converted to the probability of making the hand on the next card by dividing the number of outs by the number of unseen cards. For example, say a Texas Holdem player holds two spades, and two more appear in the flop. He has seen five cards (regardless of the number of players, as there are no upcards in Holdem except the board), of which four are spades. He thus has 9 outs for a flush out of 47 cards yet to be drawn, giving him a 9/47 chance to fill his flush on the turn. If he fails on the turn, he then has a 9/46 chance to fill on the river. Calculating the combined odds of filling on either the turn or river is more complicated: it is (1 - ((38/47) * (37/46))), or about 35%. A common approximation used is to double the number of outs and add one for the percentage to hit on the next card, or to multiply outs by four for the either-of-two case. This approximation works out to within a 1% error margin for up to 14 outs.

Note that the hidden cards of a player's opponents may affect the calculation of outs. For example, assume that a Texas hold 'em board looks like this after the third round: 5♠ K♦ 7♦ J♠, and that a player is holding A♦ 10♦. The player's current hand is just a high ace, which is not likely to win unimproved, so the player has a drawing hand. He has a minimum of nine outs for certain, called nut outs, because they will make his hand the best possible: those are the 2♦, 3♦, 4♦, 6♦, 8♦, 9♦, and Q♦ (which will give him an ace-high flush with no possible better hand on the board) and the Q♣ and Q♥, which will give him an ace-high straight with no higher hand possible. The 5♦ and J♦ will also make him an ace-high flush, so those are possible outs since they give him a hand that is likely to win, but they also make it possible for an opponent to have a full house (if the opponent has something like K♠ K♣, for example). Likewise, the Q♠ will fill his ace-high straight, but will also make it possible for an opponent to have a spade flush. It is possible that an opponent could have as little as something like 7♣ 9♣ (making a pair of sevens); in this case even catching any of the three remaining aces or tens will give the player a pair to beat the opponent's, so those are even more potential outs. In sum, the player has 9 guaranteed outs, and possibly as many as 18, depending on what cards he expects his opponents to have.

== See also ==
- Poker strategy
- Drawing
- Poker probability (Texas hold 'em)
