= Draw (poker) =

Poker hand

A poker player is drawing if they have a hand that is incomplete and needs further cards to become valuable. The hand itself is called a draw or drawing hand. For example, in seven-card stud, if four of a player's first five cards are all spades, but the hand is otherwise weak, they are drawing to a flush. In contrast, a made hand already has value and does not necessarily need to draw to win. A made starting hand with no help can lose to an inferior starting hand with a favorable draw. If an opponent has a made hand that will beat the player's draw, then the player is drawing dead; even if they make their desired hand, they will lose. Not only draws benefit from additional cards; many made hands can be improved by catching an out – and may have to in order to win.

== Outs ==
An unseen card that would improve a drawing hand to a likely winner is an out. Playing a drawing hand has a positive expectation if the probability of catching an out is greater than the pot odds offered by the pot.

The probability $P_1$ of catching an out with one card to come is:

$$P_1 = \frac{\mathrm{outs}}{\mathrm{unseen}\,\,\mathrm{cards}}$$

The probability $P_2$ of catching at least one out with two cards to come is:

$$P_2 = 1 - \frac{\mathrm{non}\,\mathrm{outs}}{\mathrm{unseen}\,\,\mathrm{cards}} \times \frac{\mathrm{non}\,\mathrm{outs} - 1}{\mathrm{unseen}\,\,\mathrm{cards} - 1}$$

$$\mathrm{non}\,\mathrm{outs} = {\mathrm{unseen}\,\,\mathrm{cards}} -\mathrm{outs}$$

Outs	One Card %	Two Card %	One Card Odds	Two Card Odds	Draw Type
1	2%	4%	46	23	Backdoor Straight or Flush (Requires two cards)
2	4%	8%	22	12	Pocket Pair to Set
3	7%	13%	14	7	One Overcard
4	9%	17%	10	5	Inside Straight / Two Pair to Full House
5	11%	20%	8	4	One Pair to Two Pair or Set
6	13%	24%	6.7	3.2	No Pair to Pair / Two Overcards
7	15%	28%	5.6	2.6	Set to Full House or Quads
8	17%	32%	4.7	2.2	Open Straight
9	19%	35%	4.1	1.9	Flush
10	22%	38%	3.6	1.6	Inside Straight & Two Overcards
11	24%	42%	3.2	1.4	Open Straight & One Overcard
12	26%	45%	2.8	1.2	Flush & Inside Straight / Flush & One Overcard
13	28%	48%	2.5	1.1	
14	30%	51%	2.3	0.95	
15	33%	54%	2.1	0.85	Flush & Open Straight / Flush & Two Overcards
16	34%	57%	1.9	0.75	
17	37%	60%	1.7	0.66	

A dead out is a card that would normally be considered an out for a particular drawing hand, but should be excluded when calculating the probability of catching an out. Outs can be dead for two reasons:

- A dead out may work to improve an opponent's hand to a superior hand. For example, if Ted has a spade flush draw and Alice has an outside straight draw, any spades that complete Alice's straight are dead outs because they would also give Ted a flush.
- A dead out may have already been seen. In some game variations such as stud poker, some of the cards held by each player are seen by all players.

== Types of draws ==
=== Flush draw ===
A flush draw, or four flush, is a hand with four cards of the same suit that may improve to a flush. For example, K♣ 9♣ 8♣ 5♣ x. A flush draw has nine outs (thirteen cards of the suit less the four already in the hand). If a player has a flush draw in Hold'em, the probability to flush the hand in the end is 34.97 percent if there are two more cards to come, and 19.56 percent (9 live cards divided by 46 unseen cards) if there is only one more card to come.

=== Outside straight draw ===
An outside straight draw, also called up and down, double-ended straight draw or open-ended straight draw, is a hand with four of the five needed cards in sequence (and could be completed on either end) that may improve to a straight. For example, x-9-8-7-6-x. An outside straight draw has eight outs (four cards to complete the top of the straight and four cards to complete the bottom of the straight). Straight draws including an ace are not outside straight draws, because the straight can only be completed on one end (has four outs).

=== Inside straight draw ===
An inside straight draw, or gutshot draw or belly buster draw, is a hand with four of the five cards needed for a straight, but missing one in the middle. For example, 9-x-7-6-5. An inside straight draw has four outs (four cards to fill the missing internal rank). Because straight draws including an ace only have four outs, they are also considered inside straight draws. For example, A-K-Q-J-x or A-2-3-4-x. The probability of catching an out for an inside straight draw is half that of catching an out for an outside straight draw.

=== Double inside straight draw ===
A double inside straight draw, or double gutshot draw or double belly buster draw can occur when either of two ranks will make a straight, but both are "inside" draws. For example, in 11-card games, 9-x-7-6-5-x-3, or 9-8-x-6-5-x-3-2, or in Texas Hold'em when holding 9-J hole cards on a 7-10-K flop. The probability of catching an out for a double inside straight draw is the same as for an outside straight draw.

=== Other draws ===
Sometimes a made hand needs to draw to a better hand. For example, if a player has two pair or three of a kind, but an opponent has a straight or flush, to win the player must draw an out to improve to a full house (or four of a kind). There are a multitude of potential situations where one hand needs to improve to beat another, but the expected value of most drawing plays can be calculated by counting outs, computing the probability of winning, and comparing the probability of winning to the pot odds.

=== Backdoor draw ===
A backdoor draw, or runner-runner draw, is a drawing hand that needs to catch two outs to win. For example, a hand with three cards of the same suit has a backdoor flush draw because it needs two more cards of the suit. The probability $P_{rr}$ of catching two outs with two cards to come is:

$$P_{rr} = \frac{\mathrm{outs}}{\mathrm{unseen}\,\,\mathrm{cards}} \times \frac{\mathrm{outs} - 1}{\mathrm{unseen}\,\,\mathrm{cards} - 1}$$

For example, if after the flop in Texas hold 'em, a player has a backdoor flush draw (e.g., three spades), the probability of catching two outs on the turn and river is (10 ÷ 47) × (9 ÷ 46) = 4.16 percent. Completing backdoor draws is generally unlikely; the probability of seeing two out of seven outs on the turn and river is roughly the same as completing a draw with only out on either the turn or the river (1/47 + 1/46 = 4.3%). A backdoor outside straight draw (such as J-10-9) is equally likely as a backdoor flush, but any other 3-card straight draw (such as J-8-7) is less likely than getting a specific card after the flop, calculated above.

=== Drawing dead ===
A player is said to be drawing dead when the hand he hopes to complete will nonetheless lose to a player who already has a better one. For example, drawing to a straight or flush when the opponent already has a full house. In games with community cards, the term can also refer to a situation where no possible additional community card draws results in a win for a player. (This may be because another player has folded the cards that would complete his hand, his opponent's hand is already stronger than any hand he can possibly draw to or that the card that completes his hand also augments his opponent's.)

== See also ==
- Poker jargon
- Poker probability
- Poker strategy
