= Hand history =

Record of the hand and actions in an online poker game

A hand history is a record of the action in an online poker hand. These records are generated by poker sites, and used internally to track player behavior and provide a verifiable log to resolve player disputes. If the poker site and client permit it, plain text versions of hand histories may be made available to players, which facilitates personal record-keeping and the sharing of interesting or problematic hands. A typical hand history will contain the following information:

The game type and limit for the table (for example, limit Texas hold 'em $3/$6).
The names and seating positions of all players at the table.
The size of player stacks at the beginning of hand.
Any hole cards known to the requestor.
Any cards dealt face up on the table.
The betting actions of each player in each betting round.

While the internal version of the hand history will display all hole cards, the version made available to a player will show only those of the player himself and any hole cards revealed at showdown or voluntarily shown by a player. Some commercial software products make use of hand histories to assemble a record of a player's winnings and losses, and track their playing habits as well as those of their opponents.

== Sample hand history ==
PokerStars Hand #156605842579: Tournament #1618015625, $2.00+$2.00+$0.40 USD Hold'em No Limit - Level XVIII (300/600) - 2016/07/29 23:25:05 MSK [2016/07/29 16:25:05 ET]
Table '1618015625 40' 9-max Seat #7 is the button
Seat 1: nossoff (22844 in chips) 
Seat 2: Gr0z3LB (27895 in chips) 
Seat 3: yarikkkkk (7005 in chips) 
Seat 4: sigis1313 (18222 in chips) 
Seat 5: S21berlin (25318 in chips) 
Seat 6: Hero (8240 in chips) 
Seat 7: tommesk (8185 in chips) 
Seat 8: gergelyt3 (17912 in chips) 
Seat 9: endreooo (50289 in chips) 
nossoff: posts the ante 90
Gr0z3LB: posts the ante 90
yarikkkkk: posts the ante 90
sigis1313: posts the ante 90
S21berlin: posts the ante 90
Hero: posts the ante 90
tommesk: posts the ante 90
gergelyt3: posts the ante 90
endreooo: posts the ante 90
gergelyt3: posts small blind 300
endreooo: posts big blind 600
*** HOLE CARDS ***
Dealt to Hero [Jd Ac]
nossoff: raises 600 to 1200
Gr0z3LB: folds 
yarikkkkk: folds 
sigis1313: folds 
S21berlin: folds 
Hero: raises 6950 to 8150 and is all-in
tommesk: folds 
gergelyt3: folds 
endreooo: folds 
nossoff: calls 6950
*** FLOP *** [7h 2h 5s]
*** TURN *** [7h 2h 5s] [5d]
*** RIVER *** [7h 2h 5s 5d] [4d]
*** SHOW DOWN ***
nossoff: shows [Qd Ah] (a pair of Fives)
Hero: shows [Jd Ac] (a pair of Fives - lower kicker)
nossoff collected 18010 from pot
nossoff wins $1 for eliminating Hero and their own bounty increases by $1 to $6
Hero finished the tournament in 5028th place
*** SUMMARY ***
Total pot 18010 | Rake 0 
Board [7h 2h 5s 5d 4d]
Seat 1: nossoff showed [Qd Ah] and won (18010) with a pair of Fives
Seat 2: Gr0z3LB folded before Flop (didn't bet)
Seat 3: yarikkkkk folded before Flop (didn't bet)
Seat 4: sigis1313 folded before Flop (didn't bet)
Seat 5: S21berlin folded before Flop (didn't bet)
Seat 6: Hero showed [Jd Ac] and lost with a pair of Fives
Seat 7: tommesk (button) folded before Flop (didn't bet)
Seat 8: gergelyt3 (small blind) folded before Flop
Seat 9: endreooo (big blind) folded before Flop

PokerStars Hand #156624936552:  Hold'em No Limit ($0.05/$0.10 USD) - 2016/07/30 4:59:02 ET
Table 'Shenzhen' 9-max Seat #3 is the button
Seat 3: Hero ($10.05 in chips) 
Seat 8: Alpha242 ($10.89 in chips) 
Hero: posts small blind $0.05
Alpha242: posts big blind $0.10
*** HOLE CARDS ***
Dealt to Hero [6h 7h]
Hero: raises $0.10 to $0.20
Alpha242: calls $0.10
*** FLOP *** [5s Jd Jc]
Alpha242: checks 
Hero: bets $0.20
Alpha242: raises $0.51 to $0.71
Hero: calls $0.51
*** TURN *** [5s Jd Jc] [2s]
Alpha242: bets $1
Hero: raises $1.60 to $2.60
Alpha242: folds 
Uncalled bet ($1.60) returned to Hero
Hero collected $3.65 from pot
Hero: doesn't show hand 
*** SUMMARY ***
Total pot $3.82 | Rake $0.17 
Board [5s Jd Jc 2s]
Seat 3: Hero (button) (small blind) collected ($3.65)
Seat 8: Alpha242 (big blind) folded on the Turn

PokerStars Hand #156632473469:  Hold'em No Limit ($0.05/$0.10 USD) - 2016/07/30 10:40:31 AT [2016/07/30 9:40:31 ET]
Table 'Eltigen' 9-max Seat #8 is the button
Seat 1: raika14 ($10 in chips)
Seat 2: mazi161 ($11 in chips)
Seat 3: Hero ($10.10 in chips)
Seat 4: 5amevang ($10.42 in chips)
Seat 6: dinqua ($10.15 in chips)
Seat 7: gragasinha ($5.55 in chips)
Seat 8: MilonTl ($15.46 in chips)
Seat 9: enchantressA ($10.30 in chips)
enchantressA: posts small blind $0.05
raika14: posts big blind $0.10
*** HOLE CARDS ***
Dealt to Hero [Jh Jc]
mazi161: folds
Hero: raises $0.20 to $0.30
5amevang: folds
dinqua: raises $0.60 to $0.90
gragasinha: folds
MilonTl: folds
enchantressA: folds
raika14: folds
Hero: calls $0.60
*** FLOP *** [7h 8d 5c]
Hero: checks
dinqua: bets $1.30
Hero: calls $1.30
*** TURN *** [7h 8d 5c] [8c]
Hero: checks
dinqua: bets $2.90
Hero: folds
Uncalled bet ($2.90) returned to dinqua
dinqua collected $4.35 from pot
*** SUMMARY ***
Total pot $4.55 | Rake $0.20
Board [7h 8d 5c 8c]
Seat 1: raika14 (big blind) folded before Flop
Seat 2: mazi161 folded before Flop (didn't bet)
Seat 3: Hero folded on the Turn
Seat 4: 5amevang folded before Flop (didn't bet)
Seat 6: dinqua collected ($4.35)
Seat 7: gragasinha folded before Flop (didn't bet)
Seat 8: MilonTl (button) folded before Flop (didn't bet)
Seat 9: enchantressA (small blind) folded before Flop

PokerStars Game #27738502010: Tournament #160417133, $0.25+$0.00 Hold'em No Limit - Level XV (250/500) - 2009/05/02 13:32:38 ET
Table '160417133 3' 9-max Seat #8 is the button
Seat 1: LLC 4Eva (9182 in chips) 
Seat 2: 618shooter (25711 in chips) is sitting out
Seat 3: suposd2bRich (21475 in chips) 
Seat 4: ElT007 (60940 in chips) 
Seat 5: Orlando I (18044 in chips) 
Seat 6: ih82bcool2 (8338 in chips) 
Seat 7: kovilen007 (8353 in chips) 
Seat 8: GerKingTiger (4404 in chips) 
Seat 9: Phontaz (23553 in chips) 
LLC 4Eva: posts the ante 60
618shooter: posts the ante 60
suposd2bRich: posts the ante 60
ElT007: posts the ante 60
Orlando I: posts the ante 60
ih82bcool2: posts the ante 60
kovilen007: posts the ante 60
GerKingTiger: posts the ante 60
Phontaz: posts the ante 60
Phontaz: posts small blind 250
LLC 4Eva: posts big blind 500
*** HOLE CARDS ***
Dealt to ElT007 [Qd Qc]
618shooter: folds 
suposd2bRich: folds 
ElT007: raises 2000 to 2500
Orlando I: raises 15484 to 17984 and is all-in
ih82bcool2: folds 
kovilen007: calls 8293 and is all-in
GerKingTiger: folds 
Phontaz: calls 17734
LLC 4Eva: folds 
ElT007: raises 15484 to 33468
Phontaz: calls 5509 and is all-in
Uncalled bet (9975) returned to ElT007
*** FLOP *** [2d 2c 3c]
*** TURN *** [2d 2c 3c] [8h]
*** RIVER *** [2d 2c 3c 8h] [4d]
*** SHOW DOWN ***
Phontaz: shows [9s 9h] (two pair, Nines and Deuces)
ElT007: shows [Qd Qc] (two pair, Queens and Deuces)
618shooter has returned
ElT007 collected 11018 from side pot-2 
Orlando I: shows [5d 5h] (two pair, Fives and Deuces)
ElT007 collected 29073 from side pot-1 
kovilen007: shows [Kh As] (a pair of Deuces)
ElT007 collected 34212 from main pot
*** SUMMARY ***
Total pot 74303 Main pot 34212. Side pot-1 29073. Side pot-2 11018. | Rake 0 
Board [2d 2c 3c 8h 4d]
Seat 1: LLC 4Eva (big blind) folded before Flop
Seat 2: 618shooter folded before Flop (didn't bet)
Seat 3: suposd2bRich folded before Flop (didn't bet)
Seat 4: ElT007 showed [Qd Qc] and won (74303) with two pair, Queens and Deuces
Seat 5: Orlando I showed [5d 5h] and lost with two pair, Fives and Deuces
Seat 6: ih82bcool2 folded before Flop (didn't bet)
Seat 7: kovilen007 showed [Kh As] and lost with a pair of Deuces
Seat 8: GerKingTiger (button) folded before Flop (didn't bet)
Seat 9: Phontaz (small blind) showed [9s 9h] and lost with two pair, Nines and Deuces

== See also ==
- Glossary of poker terms
