= College of Creative Studies =

Undergraduate college at the University of California, Santa Barbara

Coordinates: 34.411172°N 119.845363°W

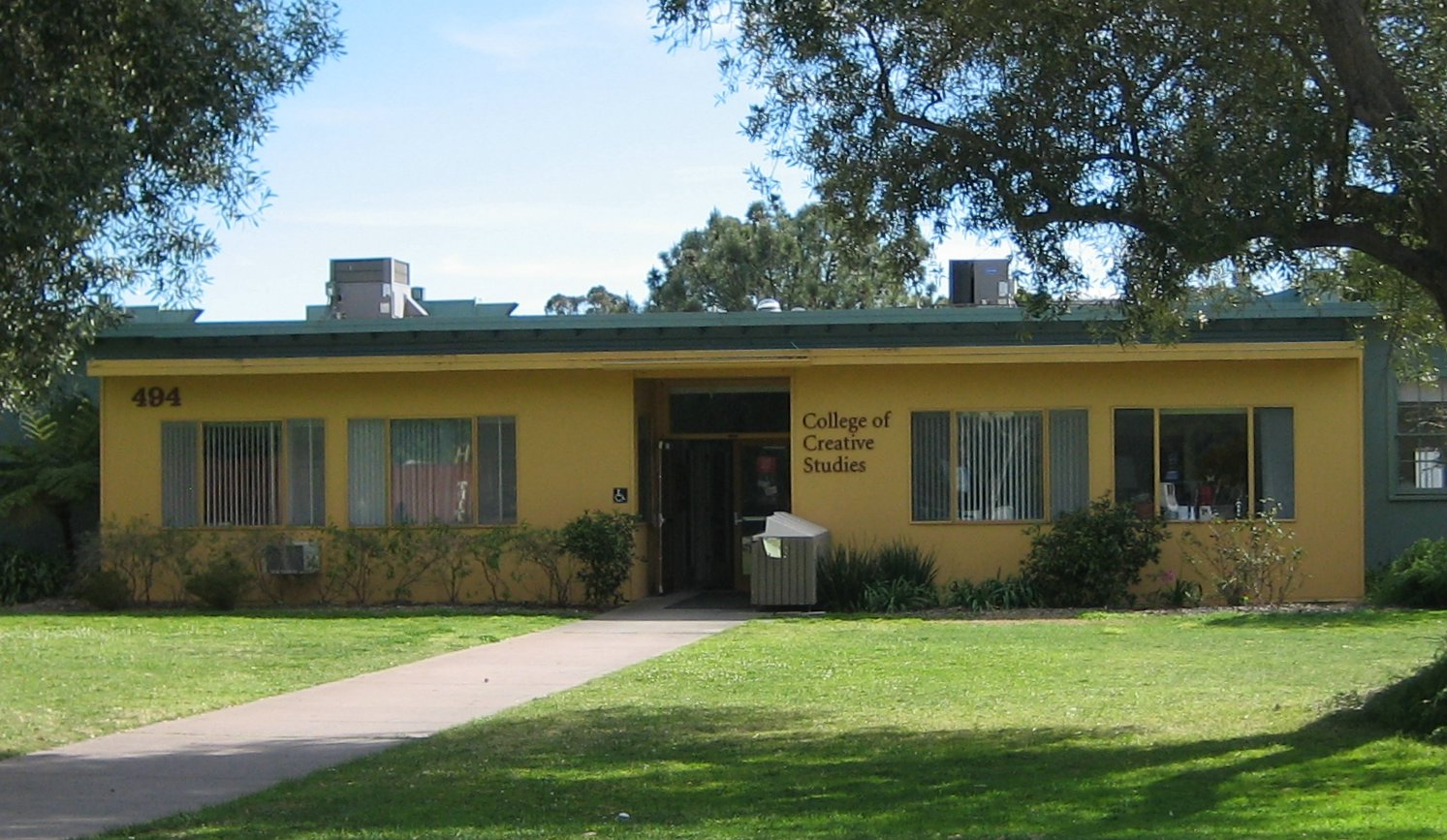
- Motto: A Graduate School for Undergraduates
- Type: Public
- Established: 1967
- Parent institution: University of California, Santa Barbara
- Undergraduates: 350
- Location: Santa Barbara, California, USA
- Website: ccs.ucsb.edu

The College of Creative Studies (CCS) is the smallest of the three undergraduate colleges at the University of California, Santa Barbara, unique within the University of California system in terms of structure and philosophy. Its small size, student privileges, and grading system are designed to encourage self-motivated students with strong interests in a field to accomplish original work as undergraduates. A former provost described it as a "graduate school for undergraduates". The college has roughly 350 students in nine majors and approximately 60 professors and lecturers. There is an additional application process to the standard UC Santa Barbara admission for prospective CCS students, and CCS accepts applications for admissions throughout the year.

The college offers nine majors: Art, Biology, Chemistry and Biochemistry, Computing, Marine Science, Mathematics, Music Composition, Physics, and Writing and Literature.

== History ==
In the late 1960s, the second chancellor of UC Santa Barbara, Vernon I. Cheadle, was looking for an alternative education program for undergraduate students which could embody the new thinking of the 60s and also attract attention to his growing university. He contacted a professor in the English department, Marvin Mudrick, to come up with ideas for this new program. In 1967 the University of California allowed funding for Mudrick to start up the most promising of those ideas, the College of Creative Studies.

The program started with approximately 50 students in 7 majors: Art, Biology, Chemistry, Mathematics, Music Composition, Literature, and Physics. The experimental program struck a chord with its students and faculty, and along with the powerful pushing of Mudrick as its provost, it secured its place at UC Santa Barbara. The program grew over the years in student and faculty size and in 1975 found its home in a building at UC Santa Barbara that dates from when the campus was a World War II marine base. In 1995, the college added the major of Computer Science. In 2005, with the retirement of Provost William Ashby, the title of the Provost was changed to Dean and the College was placed under the leadership of Dr. Bruce Tiffney. In fall 2020, the college added the Marine Science major.

The Art department includes the only undergraduate book arts program in the University of California system. Recently, the Physics program has become regarded as one of the best undergraduate Physics programs in the nation; its students attend graduate schools with percentages resembling those of Ivy Leagues. CCS students have won the UC Santa Barbara Chancellor's Award for Excellence in Undergraduate Research several times in recent years. Literature students run Spectrum, a literary magazine, and Into the Teeth of the Wind, a poetry review.

== Philosophy ==
The philosophy of the College of Creative Studies is that certain undergraduate students are capable of rigorously exploring and adding to their chosen field of knowledge. Students skip introductory courses as appropriate and are encouraged to accomplish original work throughout their time at the College: Writing & Literature students compile a portfolio of writing, art students put on a minimum of two shows displaying their work, music students perform their own compositions, and science students enter labs early in their undergraduate career to conduct research and write scholarly papers for publication.

The College considers students to be the most important people involved, not the faculty or administration. It has a low student-teacher ratio, and each student is paired with a faculty adviser with whom they meet at least once a quarter.

With support from a faculty advisor, students may create and teach seminar courses that other students can take for credit.

== Privileges and grading system ==
CCS students have few general education requirements and may take almost any course in the entire university, including graduate classes, provided they have permission from the instructor. They can drop classes up to the last day of instruction in the quarter, a privilege intended to encourage students to attempt taking many units and advanced classes without being penalized, in the event that they are unable to fulfill these commitments.

In CCS classes, students do not receive letter grades. Instead, the College uses a sliding unit scale where if a student completes all the work for a class at a satisfactory level, the student receives a full 4 units for most classes. If the student completes less work, he/she would receive fewer units, and if the student goes beyond expectations, a professor may give student more units. This system aims to promote a non-competitive atmosphere that focuses more on the student learning the material rather than learning how to take a test.

CCS students are afforded many privileges to help in the pursuit of their education.

- Fewer prerequisites: If a CCS student can show a capability of taking an upper division or graduate class, even without the prerequisites, the college greatly facilitates the process of getting the student in that class.
- Drop class and change grading: CCS students may drop any class up until the last day of instruction. This privilege is given as a backup if a student happens to try taking advanced classes or more classes than the usual student. They may also change their grading between letter grade or pass/no-pass for classes outside CCS.
- Priority registration: CCS students are among the first students at UC Santa Barbara to sign up for classes each quarter. They sign up at the same time as honors students and athletes.
- Higher unit cap: CCS students have a unit cap of 95.5 units per quarter. However, most students take between 15 and 25 units a quarter.
- Building access: All CCS students have their access card registered at the CCS Advising Office and can enter the building with a registered card through the electronic locks at side entrances from 7:30 AM to 10:00 PM.
- Computer Lab: CCS students have a computer lab in the building where they have free Internet access, printing and photocopying.
- Library checkout: CCS students get quarter-long check-out from the UC Santa Barbara library and may renew materials up to five times.
- SURF: All CCS students are eligible to apply for the college's summer undergraduate research fellowships. The standard package for one student is a stipend supporting a 10-12-week project.

== The building ==
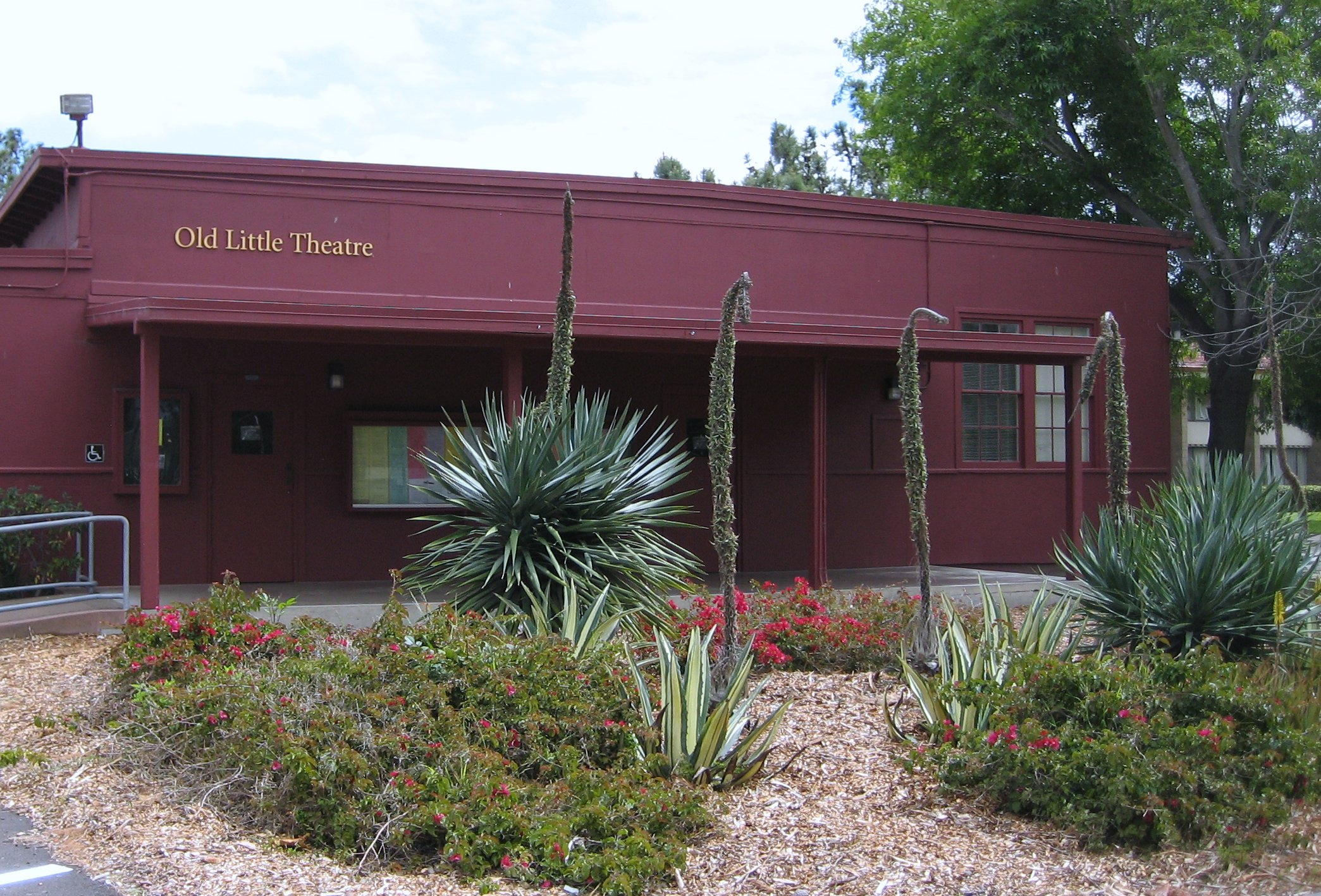
Old Little Theatre

The College of Creative Studies is housed in its own single story building, number 494, located between campus dorms, a dining commons, and the University Center. The building was built during World War II and shares the title as the oldest building at UC Santa Barbara with the other buildings left from when the campus was a marine base.

The building contains classrooms, art studios, faculty and administrative offices, an art gallery, computer labs, print and wood shops and a small 100 person theater. For most of its life it was painted brown, but in early 2005 the administrative offices were painted yellow, the college proper was painted green and the Old Little Theatre was painted red.

The building acts as a "home base" for its students, who spend time in the building studying and socializing. Students are allowed to personalize the building, so the walls have stickers and art, classrooms contain couches and modified desks and there are a few roaming stuffed animals.

Although many students and staff members are fond of the building, the college has outgrown it and is looking for funds to renovate it and/or build new facilities.

== Notable alumni and faculty ==
CCS alumni include:

- Art: Carol Bennett, Macduff Everton, Mary Heebner, Peggy Oki, Halsey Rodman, Loie Hollowell
- Biology: Angela Belcher (awarded 2004 MacArthur "Genius" Fellowship), Carol W. Greider (shared the Nobel Prize for Physiology or Medicine in 2009), Richard Anthony Jefferson (named to Scientific American's 50 Most Influential Technologists), John La Puma, Marlene Zuk (member of the National Academy of Sciences), Ronald Vale (discovered kinesin, winner of the 2017 Shaw Prize in Life Science and Medicine)
- Computer Science: Jay Freeman (founder of Cydia)
- Physics: Alex Filippenko, Mika McKinnon
- Literature: Susie Cagle, Parry Gripp, Christine Lehner, Chanel Miller, Nathan Thrall, Ethlie Ann Vare
- Music Composition: Paul Chavez, Stephen Malinowski

CCS faculty have included:

- Art: Charles Garabedian, John McCracken, Hank Pitcher
- Literature: Laure-Anne Bosselaar, Marvin Mudrick, Max Schott, Barry Spacks, Elizabeth Wong
- Music Composition: Sarah Gibson
- Physics: John M. Martinis
