= Border art =

Art at physical or imagined boundaries

Border Art is a contemporary art practice rooted in the socio-political experience(s), such as of those on the U.S.-Mexico borderlands, or frontera. Since its conception in the mid-80's, this artistic practice has assisted in the development of questions surrounding homeland, borders, surveillance, identity, race, ethnicity, and national origin(s).

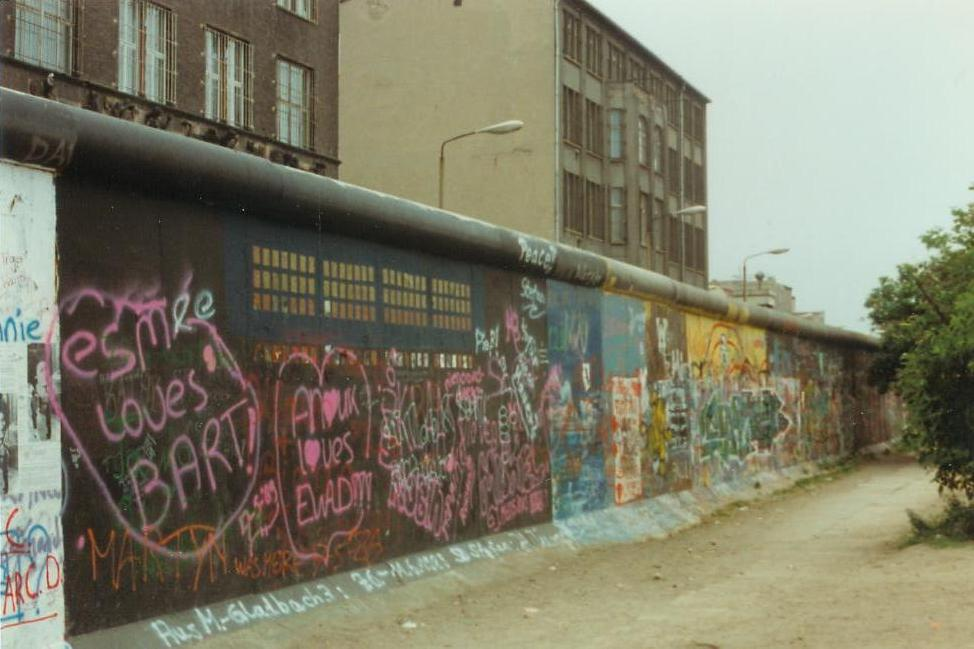
Berlin Wall (1989)

Border art as a conceptual artistic practice, however, opens up the possibility for artists to explore similar concerns of identity and national origin(s) but whose location is not specific to the Mexico- United States border. A border can be a division, dividing groups of people and families. Borders can include but are not limited to language, culture, social and economic class, religion, and national identity. In addition to a division, a border can also conceive a borderland area that can create a cohesive community separate from the mainstream cultures and identities portrayed in the communities away from the borders, such as the Tijuana-San Diego border between Mexico and the United States.

Border art can be defined as an art that is created in reference to any number of physical or imagined boundaries. This art can but is not limited to social, political, physical, emotional and/or nationalist issues. Border art is not confined to one particular medium. Border art/artists often address the forced politicization of human bodies and physical land and the arbitrary, yet incredibly harmful, separations that are created by these borders and boundaries. These artists are often "border crossers" themselves. They may cross borders of traditional art-making (through performance, video, or a combination of mediums). They may at once be artists and activists, existing in multiple social roles at once. Many border artists defy easy classifications in their artistic practice and work.

== History of Border Art specific to the Mexico-United States Border ==
The first artwork relating to border art was a multimedia piece title Siluetas Encarnadas, or Incarnated Silhouettes, by Zopilote (Manuel Mancillas). This piece was performed by Zopilote an consisted of music, dance, and a bilingual spoken word. Although there was no direct reference to the U.S.-Mexico border, it portrays Zopilote's vision of the chaotic, cultural convergence of the borderland

Ila Nicole Sheren states, "Border Art didn't become a category until the Border Art Workshop/Taller de Arte Fronterizo (BAW/TAF). Starting in 1984, and continuing in several iterations through the early twenty-first century, the binational collective transformed San Diego-Tijuana into a highly charged site for conceptual performance art ...The BAW/TAF artists were to link performance, site-specificity, and the U.S.-Mexico Border, as well as the first to export "border art" to other geographic locations and situations." A proponent of Border Art is Guillermo Gómez-Peña, founder of The Border Arts Workshop/Taller de Arte Fronterizo. The Border Arts Workshop/Taller de Arte Fronterizo pioneered tackling the political tensions of the borderlands, at a time when the region was gaining increased attention from the media due to the NAFTA debates. The contradiction of the border opening to the free flow of capital but simultaneously closing to the flow of immigrants provided the opportunity to address other long-existing conflicts within the region.

Antonio Prieto argues that "As opposed to folk artists, the new generation belongs to the middle class, has formal training and self-consciously conceives itself as a producer of 'border art.' Moreover, their art is politically charged, and assumes a confrontational stance vis-à-vis both Mexican and U.S. government policies."

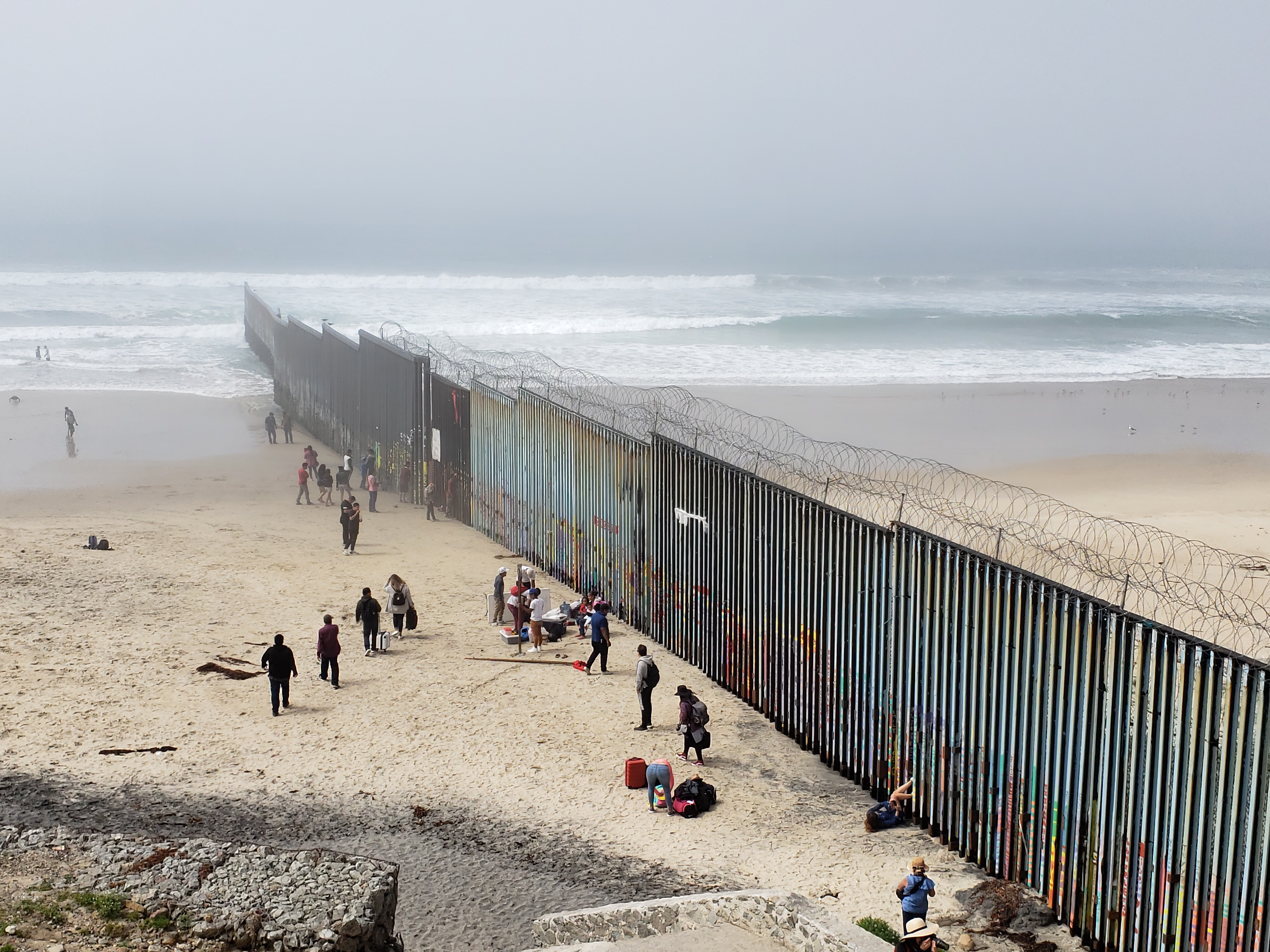
El muro Tijuana - San Diego

In their introduction to the exhibition, La Frontera/The Border: Art About the Mexico/United States Border Experience, Patricio Chávez and Madeleine Grynstejn state, “For the artists represented here, the border is not a physical boundary line separating two sovereign nations, but rather a place of its own, defined by a confluence of cultures that is not geographically bounded either to the north or to the south. The border is the specific nexus of an authentic zone of hybridized cultural experience, reflecting the migration and cross-pollination of ideas and images between different cultures that arise from real and constant human, cultural, and sociopolitical movements. In this decade, borders and international boundaries have become paramount in our national consciousness and in international events. As borders define the economy, political ideology, and national identity of countries throughout the world, so we should examine our own borderlands for an understanding of ourselves and each other.” Prieto notes that “While the first examples of Chicano art in the late sixties took up issues of land, community and oppression, it was not until later that graphic artists like Rupert García began to explicitly depict the border in their work. García's 1973 silkscreen "¡Cesen Deportación!," for example, calls for an end to the exploitative treatment of migrant workers who are allowed to cross the border and are then deported at the whim of U.S. economic and political interests.”

Prieto notes that for Mexican and Chicano artists, the aesthetics of rascuache created a hybrid of Mexican and American visual culture. While it does not have an exact English translation, the term, rascuache, can be likened to the artistic term, kitsch. It translates most closely from Spanish as "leftover" with a sensibility closest to the English term, kitsch.

=== Related artworks ===
Border Tuner is a project by the Mexican-Canadian Artist Rafael Lozano-Hemmer that explores connections which exist between cities and people on either side of the Mexico - United States border. Situated in the El Paso / Juarez borderlands, this interactive work utilizes large searchlights as a means for participants on either side of the border to communicate with one another. When one beam of light interacts with another, a microphone and speaker automatically switch on allowing participants on both sides to communicate across the hardened infrastructure which divides their two countries. The searchlight, most commonly used in applications of surveillance and apprehension of migrants by the United States Border Patrol is one of the symbols which Lozano-Hemmer subverts in his work. Of this loaded symbol he says: “I find searchlights absolutely abhorrent, that’s why I must work with them.”

Photographer David Taylor focused on the U.S.-Mexico border by following monuments that mark the official borders of the United States and México outlined as a result of the 1848 Treaty of Guadalupe Hidalgo. He quotes on his website, “My travels along the border have been done both alone and in the company of agents. In total, the resulting pictures are intended to offer a view into locations and situations that we generally do not access and portray a highly complex physical, social and political topography during a period of dramatic change.” In his project, Taylor has covered physical borders by documenting the environment and landscape along the border but also addresses social issues by engaging with locals, patrolman, smugglers, and many other people living in and being affected by the U.S.-México border. He also chooses to address political issues by focusing on the large issue of drug trafficking.

Borrando La Frontera (Erasing the Border) by Ana Teresa Fernandez challenges the materiality of the U.S./Mexico border through its erasure of the structure. In the film, Ana Teresa Fernandez hopes to “[turn] a wall that divides into the ocean and the sky that expands” into a symbol for potential future mobility. By making the border the same color as the sky, rendering it invisible, the artist draws attention to the naturalized sense of nation in opposition to the natural landscape. The artist creates new meaning for the sky's natural blue color, as she uses it to symbolize a geography with open borders and freedom of movement. By painting this idea over the border fence, Fernandez and her collaborators The film also emphasizes the natural elements of the scene The birds' and the water's movement, unfazed by the fence, attest to the redundancy of the fence and the politics of the U.S./Mexico border. Artesania & Cuidado (Craft & Care) by Tanya Aguiñiga serves as a collection of the artists work in activism, design, and documentation. Specifically, Aguiñiga's entry way to the gallery sets the tone for the exhibition. Aguiñiga is also responsible for AMBOS — Art Made Between Opposite Sides. The project consisting of artworks made that foster a sense of interconnectedness in border regions. The project is multifaceted and presents itself in the form of documentary, activism, community engagement, and collaboration to activate the U.S./ Mexico border, exploring identities affected by the luminal zone of the border and to promote healthy relationships from one side of the border to the other.

Another artist tackling the contentions of the United States/Mexico border is Judi Werthein, who in 2005 created a line of shoes titled, Brinco, Spanish for the word Jump. These shoes would be distributed, free of charge, to people in Tijuana looking to cross the border. Werthein explains, "The shoe includes a compass, a flashlight because people cross at night, and inside is included also some Tylenol painkillers because many people get injured during crossing." Additionally, the shoes featured removable soles with a map of the San Diego/Tijuana border, specifically indicating favorable routes to take. On the back of the ankle of the shoe is an image of Toribio Romo González, the saint dedicated to Mexican migrants. The shoes themselves were made cheaply and mass-produced from China, imitating the means of production abused by many American companies. These shoes would also be sold in small boutique shops in San Diego for $215 a pair, advertised to the higher class audience as "one-of-a-kind art objects." The profits of this venture would then be donated to a Tijuana shelter aiding migrants in need.

Jorge Rojas's performance art is complex in its approach of reflecting his cross-cultural experiences in both Mexico and America. Rojas was born in Morelos, Mexico, and now lives in Salt Lake City, Utah. This change in residence has informed the changes in his work regarding his feelings of home vs. homeland. His work examines this change in homeland in ways that highlight his foreignness and his awareness of both cultures. His performance pieces often combine Mexican cultural themes with a performance style that creates a new space to identify the constant change in cultural identity.

== History of border art specific to Palestine-Israel ==
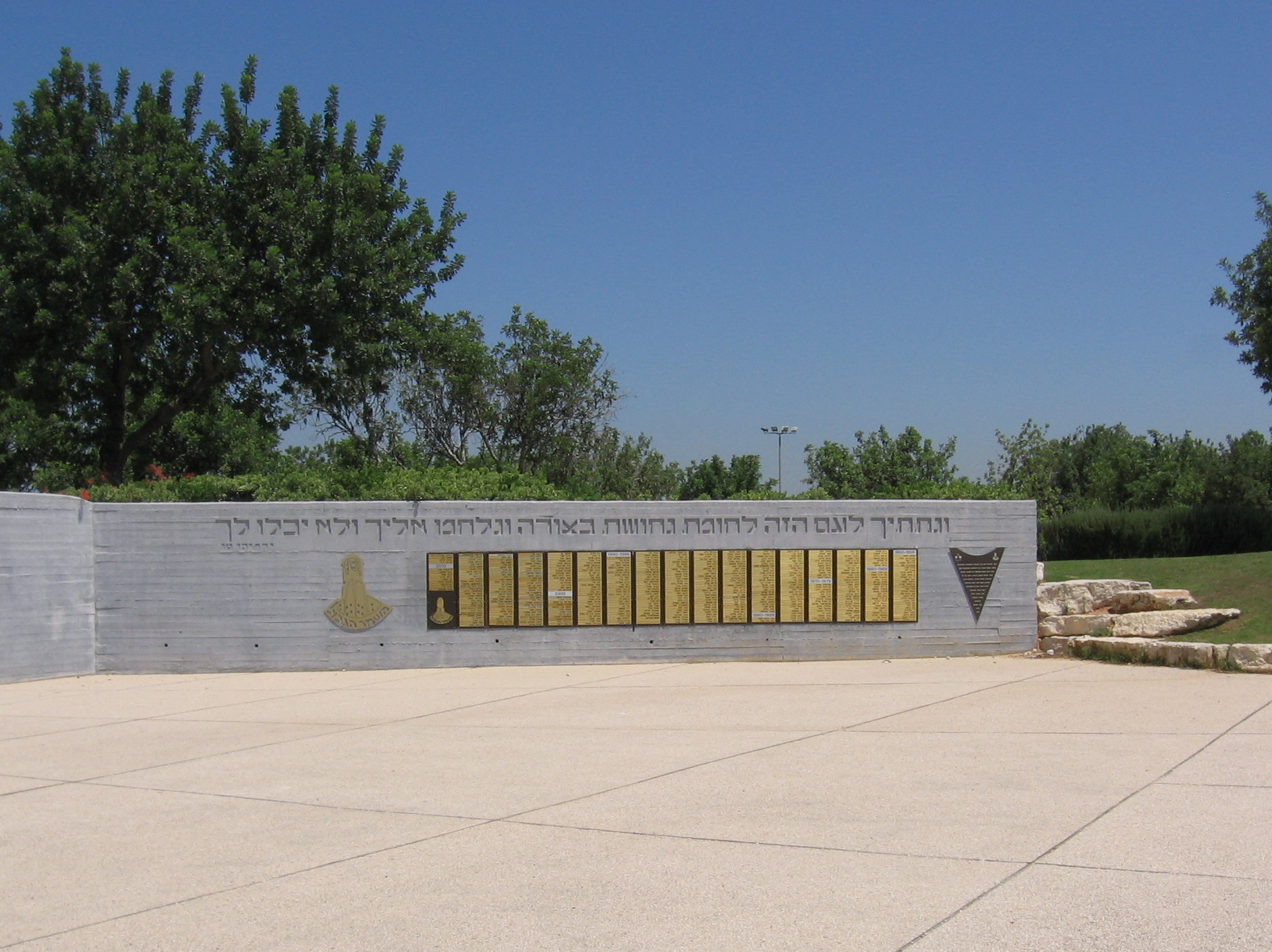
Israel Border Police Monument

In June 2005, performance artist Francis Alÿs walked from one end of Jerusalem to the other performing The Green Line. In this performance, Alÿs is carrying a can filled with green paint. The bottom of the can was perforated with a small hole, so the paint dripped out as a continuous squiggly line on the ground as he walked. The route he followed was one drawn in green on a map as part of the armistice after the 1948 Arab-Israeli War, indicating land under the control of the new state of Israel. Alÿs restricted his walking to a 15-mile stretch through a divided Jerusalem, a hike that took him down streets, through yards and parks, and over rocky abandoned terrain. Julien Deveaux documented the walk alongside Alÿs.

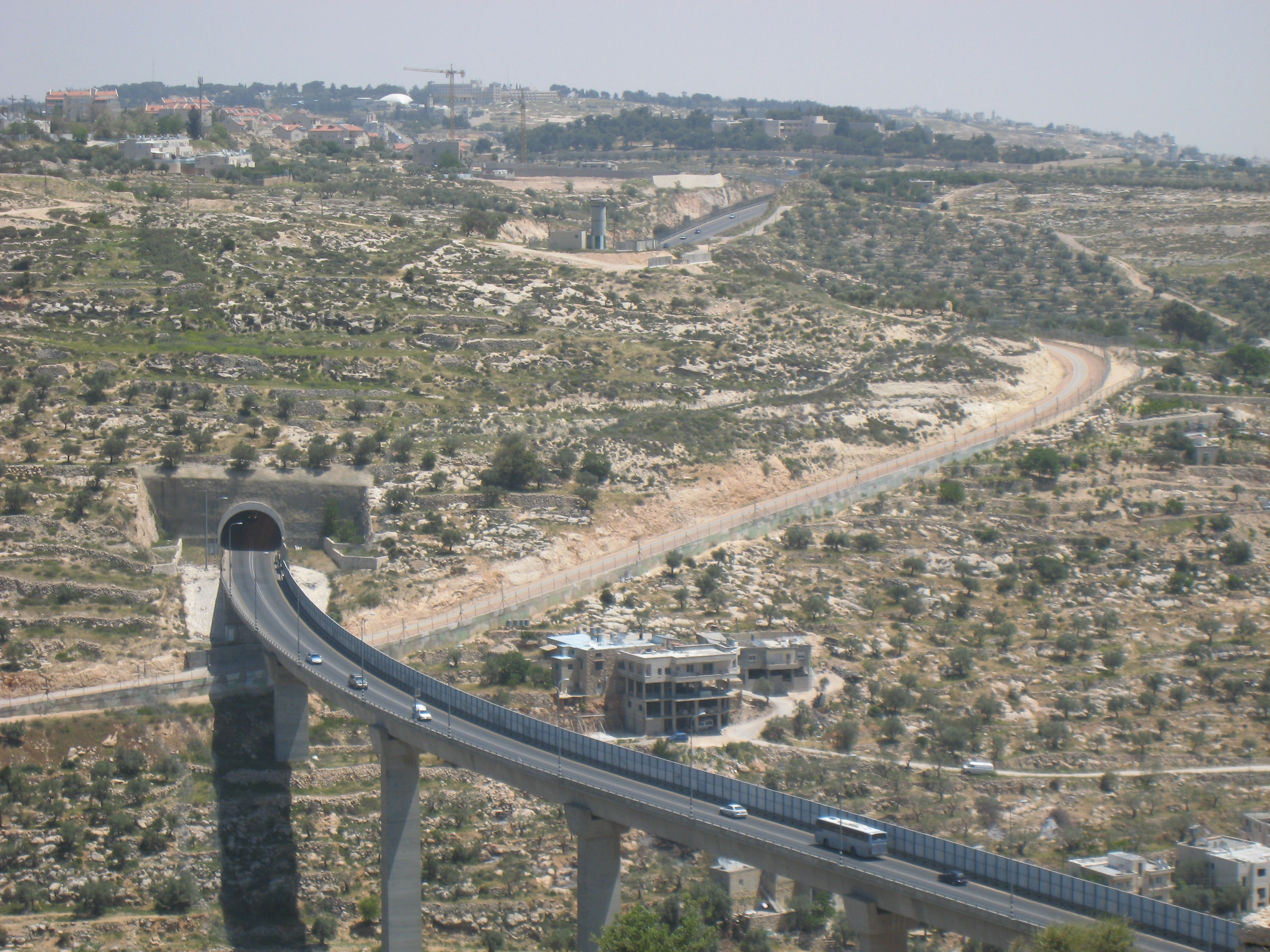
Architecture - King Hussein Bridge

Artist invested in Palestine/Israel art: Sama Alshaibi: A well known artist that uses her body as an instrument for her artwork. Focuses the context of double generational displacement as well as the notion of being "illegal" in the United States as described as psychological displacement. Her body serves as an "allegorical sight" and "captures feminine perspective." Some of her artworks are: Milk Maid, Carry Over, Together Apart, and Between Two Rivers.

=== International artists and their influence ===
Several artists from other countries have come to the Israeli West Bank barrier and used the wall itself as a canvas. They have worked with local street artists as well to express their sentiments and get across their message.

==== Banksy ====
The anonymous, UK-based artist, Banksy, has used the dimension of the wall, the division it represents, and the context behind it to make works that succeed in their environment. One of his more popular works depicts a dove, a symbol of peace, juxtaposed with it wearing a bullet-proof vest. Here, it can be inferred that Banksy is trying to express that there is a want for peace between the two nations, yet given the history of violence, they must be prepared for conflict. Essentially, he is demonstrating the fake sense of peace that is being generated as a byproduct of this wall. Other works Banksy has done over the years also including creating optical illusions to break up the solidarity of the wall. He tries to emphasize the elements of a barrier, how it divides up space and creates a disconnect from the world around the viewer. He has works such as children in front of a "hole" in front of the wall that reveals a paradise, a world unseen by the viewer due to the obstruction by the wall.

Banksy has expressed his different opinions on the Israeli-Palestine conflict and the experiences he has encountered while working on border art. An often cited conversation between Banksy and a Palestinian man helps illustrate the sentiments towards the wall from the Palestinian perspective:

"Old man: You paint the wall, you make it look beautiful.

Me [Banksy]: Thanks.

Old man: We don't want it to be beautiful, we hate this wall. Go home."

==== Swoon (artist) ====
Another artist is American born street artist, swoon, who has worked on the separation barrier as one of the few prominent female artists that have influenced the male dominated world of street art. Many of her pieces depict women as the key figures and protagonists of their respective compositions and ultimately gives another perspective to the border art phenomenon. Her border art on the separation barrier focuses on the characteristics of scale and location, causing the viewer to comprehend the sheer size of the wall in relation to the body.

One of her works that demonstrates this concept is that of her Lace-Weaving Woman, here the subject rises about halfway up the wall and looks as if she weaving her skirt. The action of weaving here implies a sense of unity, and in its context is juxtaposed as the wall is symbolized as division.

== Artworks related to other international borders ==
Shinji Ohmaki's piece “Liminal Air Space-Time” talks about the physical sense of liminal space, and how this represents a border. This liminal space is represented by a thin white piece of cloth that blows in the air. The use of vents underneath constantly keeps it floating in the air. Ohmaki says, "The cloth moves up and down, causing a fluctuation of the borders that divide various territories… some people they will feel that time is passing quickly While others might feel that time is being slowed down. By tilting the sensations, a dimension of time and space that differs from everyday life can be created." So just like and actual border you get a sense of not knowing where you are and how long you will be stuck float in the air.

The Italian artist Celestino Marco Cavalli, in 2023, created a phosphorescent track painting rocks on a mountain trail that connects Italy and France. The artwork, titled “Miriadi / Northern stars” is visible at night, on the Italian side, and it is designed to last 10 years. The artist aimed to trace a safe route for migrants heading to France, who frequently get lost or lose their lives during the dangerous journey. The function of the intervention, as the artist says, is to provide a little comfort to people in transit, an attempt to care for those who find themselves lost, frightened, confused in the midst of darkness and uncertainty. The artwork also aims to bring earth and sky closer together, creating a connection between the glowing spots and the stars, which have always guided migrants throughout history.

== Conceptual border(s) ==
Borders can also be conceptual. For example, borders between social classes or races. Gloria Anzaldúa's conceptualization of borders goes beyond national borders. Anzaldúa states: "The U.S.-Mexican border es una herida abierta where the Third World grates against the first and bleeds. And before a scab form, it hemorrhages again, the lifeblood of two worlds merging to form a third country - a border culture." Anzaldúa also refers to the border as being a locus of rupture and resistance; fragmented.Borderlands. Border artists include Ana Mendieta, Guillermo Gómez-Peña, Coco Fusco, and Mona Hatoum.

Conceptually speaking, borders, as discussed by Claire Fox, can be found anywhere; it is portable. Especially wherever poor, ethnic, immigrant, and/or minority communities collide with hegemonic society.

Prieto notes that “This double task --being critical while at the same time proposing a utopian borderless future-- was undertaken with the tools of conceptual art.” Conceptual art was a European avant-garde artistic practice which focused on the intellectual development of an artwork rather than art as object.

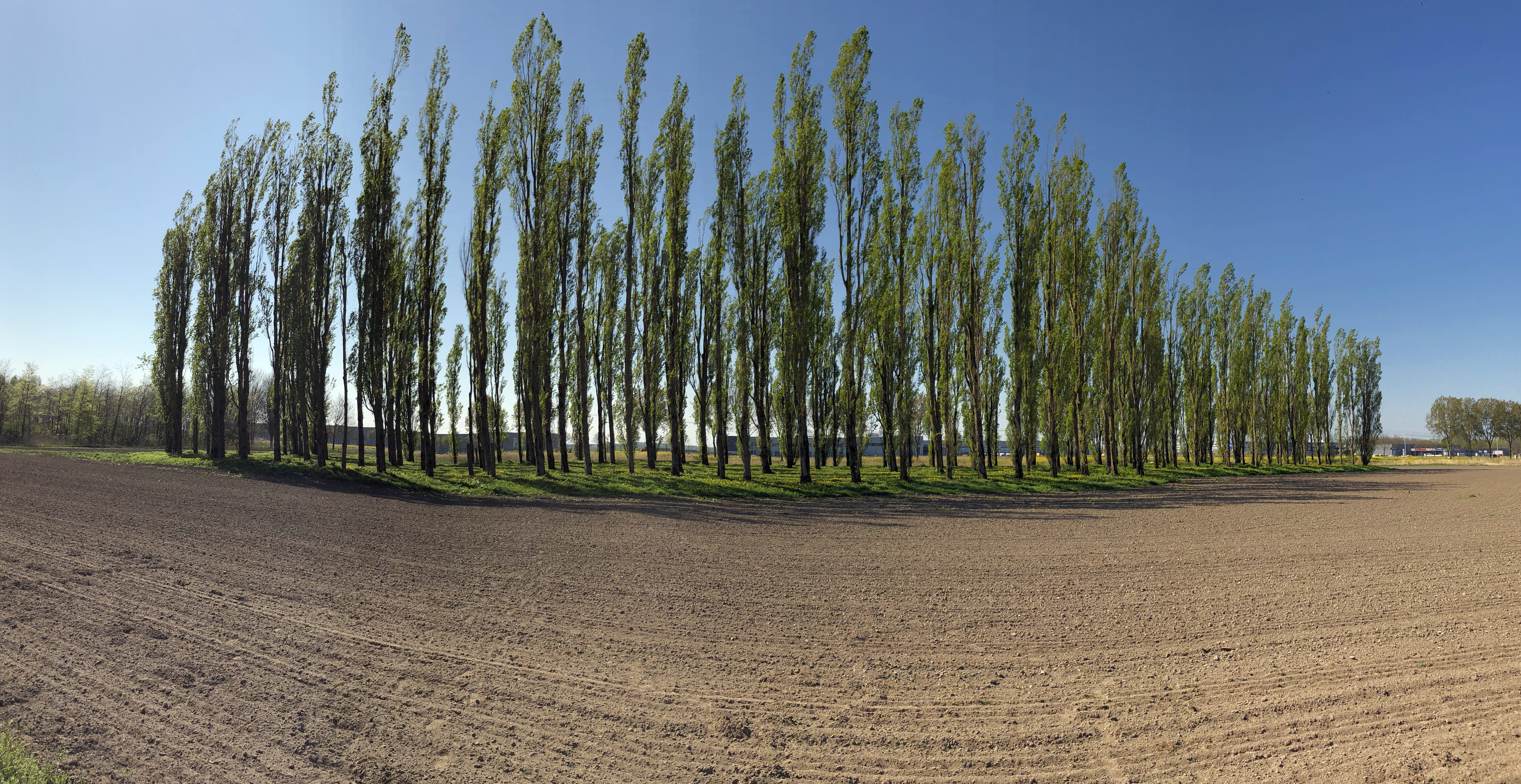

Border is further discussed in Adalbarto Aguirre Jr. and Jennifer K. Simmers academic journal and discusses the fluidity of borders saying that“The border merges land and people into a shared body of social and cultural representation.” The article also continues on saying that the meaning of border changes with the people that experience them.

Sheren additionally echoes that “‘Border’ began to refer to a variety of non-physical boundaries: those between cultural or belief systems, those separating the colonial and the postcolonial, and even those demarcating various kinds of subjects.” In this way, borders transcend physicality and become ‘portable’.

In a conceptual mindset, the human body can be viewed as a borderline. This is explored in Gloria Anzaldua's article La Frontera = The Border: Art about the Mexico/United States Border Experience. She discusses at length the Layers of our identities and how we become these boundaries within our environment. She mentions the dynamics that affect our identities such as sex, gender, education, ethnicity, race, class, etc. The author questions if these are equal parts or are pieces of our self more prevalent due to our surroundings? She speaks about the concept of unified consciousness, a mix of identity from the universal collective in human existence. She continues by saying we must articulate a person not categorized by one thing but as a history of identities such as student, mother, sister, brother, teacher, craftsman, coworker, etc.

Another individual who also explores ideas of the human body acting as a conceptual border is Sama Alshaibi. This is expressed in her personal essay and art titled Memory Work in the Palestinian Diaspora. In contextualizing her art work that is mentioned later in the piece, she discusses her and her family's personal history. "My body, pictured in my American passport, had the ability to travel and move freely in this world and could come back to the U.S. and speak for those whom I met in Occupied Palestine, confined to a single city and cut off from the world by massive walls." After referencing her own personal and familial narratives, Sama then shifts her discussion toward utilizing her body again within her art; her body acts as "a vehicle to embody and illustrate visual narratives of the Palestinian past and present." Overall, her photographs and videos depicting her body at the center of focus are all in an attempt to construct a "collective memory," "...[a memory] which culminates in a different mediation of history, one that resists the "official" and mediated history Palestine and Israel.

Stuart Hall also elaborates on the concept of identity in his article: Ethnicity, Identity, and Difference. He replaces the idea of an intersectional identity model with a layered identity model. The layered model lists titles of identity within one person in order of which is more prevalent depending on the circumstances. The intersectional is outdated due to the idea of having one central identity and branching off of it is a multitude of descriptions such as race, class, and gender.

Trinh T. Minh-ha additionally observes “boundaries not only express the desire to free/to subject one practice, one culture, one national community from/to another, but also expose the extent to which cultures are products of the continuing struggle between official and unofficial narratives–those largely circulated in favor of the State and its policies of inclusion, incorporation, and validation, as well as of exclusion, appropriation, and dispossession.”

Patssi Valdez touches on the idea of the border in her screenprint, "L.A./TJ." Valdez is an American Chicana artist currently living and working in Los Angeles. Unlike most who hear the word border and immediately assume separation, her idea of a border is a frame. Seen in L.A./TJ, Valdez frames the two cities, thus exaggerating the idea of mixing reality rather than separating the two. This mixing of reality is a symbol of her belonging and interacting with both Mexico and the United States.

== Expanding notions of “Border Art” ==
There exist inherent difficulties in articulating the traumas of the Holocaust. The art created between direct and post-generational participants redefines notions of “memory-as-border.” In other words, understanding the notions of “border” becomes complex in relation to firsthand and secondhand trauma. One example of this thought is how the experiences of those directly involved in the Holocaust effect their offspring? Marianne Hirsch describes this phenomenon as “postmemory.”

Postmemory most specifically describes the relationship of children of survivors of cultural or collective trauma to the experiences of their parents, experiences that they “remember” only as the narratives and images with which they grew up, but that are so powerful, so monumental, as to constitute memories in their own right. The term “postmemory” is meant to convey its temporal and qualitative difference from survivor memory, its secondary, or second-generation memory quality, its basis in displacement, its vicariousness and belatedness. The work of postmemory defines the familial inheritance and transmission of cultural trauma. The children of victims, survivors, witnesses, or perpetrators have different experiences of postmemory, even though they share the familial ties that facilitate intergenerational identification.

Artist Sama Alshaibi, considers Hirsch's conception of postmemory as "key to my life and to my art practice, which is, after all, an extension of who I am." Born to a Palestinian mother and an Iraqi father, Alshaibi describes her upbringing as "...dominated by traumatic narratives of losing Palestine, and all along I was mourning for a place unknown to me." As a result, her work is "based on narratives of my mother's family's forced migration from Palestine to Iraq and then on to America."

In Headdress of the Disinherited, Alshaibi photographic work features the artist wearing her recreation of a traditional Palestinian headdress lined with coins that were used as a bride's wedding dowry. Alshaibi describes the headdress as part of an inter-generational transmission: "Fashioned after my mother's faint memory of her grandmother's, our collaborative effort constructs a memorial to our family's continual migrations." Alshaibi recreated the headdress using familial ephemera and travel documentation rather than coins, "Substituting the no longer minted Palestinian currency with coins embossed with our visas, passport stamps, and pictures suggests an intellectual dowry rather than a monetary one." Dowry money hat resembles migration and displacement. The placement continues to hold an effect over heads today, with the dematerialization of women's bodies and cultures from the region.

== Border art in practice and examples of work ==
- Doris Salcedo, Shibboleth, 2007, Installation Art, Tate Modern
- Sama Alshaibi
- Ahlam Shibli
- Francis Alÿs
- Yishay Garbasz
- Mona Hatoum
- Susan Meiselas
- Christo and Jeanne-Claude, Running Fence, 1972–76, Sonoma and Marin Counties, California
- Ana Mendieta, Silueta Series, 1973-1980
- Anila Quayyum Agha
