= Veronika Pausova =

Czech-Canadian painter

- Born: 1987 (age 38–39); Prague, Czechoslovakia
- Education: Glasgow School of Art, Virginia Commonwealth University

Veronika Pausova (born 1987) is a Canadian painter of Czech origin. She is known for her experimentation with paint and wide scope of visual vocabulary. Textile-stamping techniques are combined with skewed bands of colour and textured paint, and hand-painted illustrative forms. Recurring figurative motifs such as insects, flora, disembodied toes and fingers, and whimsical everyday objects merge with surreal abstraction and graphic surface detail. She is based in Montreal, Quebec.

== Early life and education ==
Veronika Pausova was born in Prague, Czechoslovakia, in 1987, and relocated to Montreal with her family at the age of three. She received a Bachelor of Fine Arts degree from Glasgow School of Art in 2009, followed by a Master of Fine Arts degree from Virginia Commonwealth University in 2013. Following her studies, Pausova has lived in New York and Toronto, and currently lives and works in Montreal.

== Work ==
Pausova's oil paintings emerge from a layered, additive process, in which textured underpaintings give rise to a cast of fragmented bodies, creatures, and everyday objects.

Her underpaintings are built using a combination of experimental techniques: soaking the canvas with paint-imbibed sponges and fabric, pressing clothing like jeans or knit turtlenecks directly onto the surface to imprint shape and texture, or laying threads into wet pigment to create linear traces. Each technique adds a distinctive result, while setting the tone for the rest of the painting's composition, whether through washes of thinned paint, or through the removal of pigment by blotting and stamping, or her handling of pattern and precision with crisp bands of colour.

Pausova's paintings are the result of slow observation, experimentation, and problem solving. Elizabeth Diggon, curator of the Esker Foundation in Calgary, describes Pausova's additive process: “The unpredictable idiosyncrasies of the underpainting inform the compositional structure of the painting and the selection and choreography of Pausova’s figurative elements—each additive layer serves as a response to the last and informs the next.” Printed cut-outs and digital sketches help the artist map out her work, but it is ultimately experimentation that dictates the painting's composition and components. Teetering bands and blocks of textured and flat paint generate lively but purposely skewed compositions, creating both a sense of impending movement and the heightened tension of momentary suspension.

Often mistaken for photo collage, Pausova's paintings include meticulously hand-painted, realistic components, recurring fragmented bodies, creatures, flora, and everyday objects. Lacquered insects, powdery moths, and drooping flowers form theatrical arrangements, while showcasing her technical control and distinctive approach to hyperrealism.

Her work is often populated with bodies—often the artist's own—delineated, animated, and amplified, but never shown in their entirety. Pausova plays with the scale of her figurative elements, depicting them in a familiar human size, or to unsettling, towering degrees. Dislocated parts—solitary nipples, ears, and fingers—stand in for the full body, but also the visceral experiences and gestures of a body moving through the world.

These human and non-human entities are described as enacting small, often humorous narratives across the canvas, with hands grasping their own frame or gangly legs galloping away, giving the sense of a whimsical unfolding story. A 2022 essay accompanying Pausova's Esker Foundation exhibition Fast Moving Sun similarly frames her recurring hands, noses, and insects as protagonists in “diagrammatic short stories” that hover between animation and stillness, and situates the body's gestures and impulses—grasping, sniffing, touching—as continual anchor points across her body of work.

Pausova's Wading Sun (2021), for example, part of the permanent collection of the Montreal Museum of Fine Arts, shows a rhythmic procession of long legs in high-heeled boots crossing the canvas from right to left, painted in a vivid and textured palette. Several solitary toes bearing chipped nail polish line the bottom of the canvas, across bright yellow vertical blinds, emphasizing repetition and seriality while capturing a sense of playfulness, tenderness, and anxious energy that encapsulates the oddities of everyday, bodily existence.

More recently, Pausova's 2026 exhibition Clowning the Frets at Bradley Ertaskiran presented paintings shaped by her experience of new motherhood, incorporating infant onesies reimagined as protective cocoons and lactating breasts, not to illustrate parenthood literally, but to prompt a heightened sensitivity akin to the real experience.

== Career ==
Pausova has exhibited her work in solo and group exhibitions in Montreal, New York, London, Toronto, Berlin, and Prague, among other cities worldwide. In 2022, the Esker Foundation in Calgary presented Fast Moving Sun, a solo exhibition curated by Elizabeth Diggon. The exhibition featured a new body of large and small scale paintings and resulted in a titular catalogue containing essays by Diggon, and authors Sky Goodden and Elizabeth Buhe.

Pausova's work is held in the permanent collections of the Montreal Museum of Fine Arts, The Rachofsky House (Dallas), the Xiao Museum of Contemporary Art (Rizhao), and the Zabludowicz Collection (London), as well as multiple corporate and private collections.

Pausova's work has been the subject of profiles, reviews, and exhibition coverage in Canadian and international media and art publications. Canadian Art featured her painting practice in a 2018 interview, while The New Yorker discussed her work in its coverage of Condo New York, highlighting her use of figurative motifs, patterned surfaces and abstract influences. Art in America reviewed her 2017 solo exhibition at Simone Subal Gallery, New York. Other coverage has appeared in Whitehot Magazine and Canadian publications such as CBC/Radio-Canada, La Presse, Le Devoir, and Galleries West.

=== Solo and duo exhibitions ===
- Clowning the Frets, Bradley Ertaskiran, Montreal, Canada, 2026
- Exoskeleton (with Rose Nestler), Public Gallery, London, United Kingdom, 2024
- Fertile Cloth, Simone Subal, New York, United States, 2023
- Electrical Flower (with Anna Zemánková), Simone Subal, New York, United States, 2022
- Fast Moving Sun, Esker Foundation, Calgary, Canada, 2022
- Reversible Lining, Bradley Ertaskiran, Montreal, Canada, 2021
- Playing the Organs, The Sunday Painter, London, United Kingdom, 2021
- A to C, Simone Subal, New York, United States, 2019
- Busy Bodies (with Frances Adair Mckenzie), Parisian Laundry, Montreal, Canada, 2018
- Drawing the curtain, Hunt Kastner, Prague, Czech Republic, 2018
- Age me a heavy twig (with Carl Marin), Franz Kaka, Toronto, Canada, 2018
- Be a Frictionless Latecomer, Simone Subal, New York, United States, 2017
- Forest House, Tatjana Pieters, Ghent, Belgium, 2017
- Elope by Mere Thread, Paramo, Guadalajara, Mexico, 2016
- Chests in the Current, Motel, New York, United States, 2016
- Tasting the Waters, Sardine, New York, United States, 2015

=== Selected group exhibitions ===
- Exquisite Corpse (curated by Loie Hollowell), Pace Gallery, Berlin, Germany, 2026
- After Each Night We Are Emptier, Anat Ebgi, Los Angeles, United States, 2026
- Hard to imagine, Margot Samel, New York, United States, 2026
- Fall and Spin, Bradley Ertaskiran, Montreal, Canada, 2025
- Hat Trick, Lin & Lin Gallery, Taipei, Taiwan, 2024
- Now I am a lake (curated by Rose Nestler), Public Gallery, London, United Kingdom
- Fingerbang, Perrotin, Paris, France, 2022
- If I have a body (curated by Rose Bouthillier, Sandra Fraser, Troy Gronsdahl), Remai
- Modern, Saskatoon, Canada, 2019
- An Assembly of Shapes (curated by Clara Halpern), Oakville Galleries, Canada, 2018
- Gesture Play, Simone Subal, New York, United States, 2016
