= Mr. Zog's Sex Wax =

Brand of surfwax manufactured for use on surfboards

- Headquarters: Carpinteria, California, United States
- Owner: Mr. Zog
- Website: www.sexwax.com

Mr. Zog's Sex Wax is a brand of surfwax manufactured for use on surfboards that is produced in Carpinteria, California. This wax is rubbed on the top surface or "deck" of a surfboard to allow improved traction and grip for the surfer.

Mr. Zog's Sex Wax was first produced by Frederick Charles Herzog, III (also known as Mr. Zog) and chemist Nate Skinner in 1972. Hank Pitcher designed their original logo.

Due to the product name, promotional materials such as bumper stickers and t-shirts became extremely popular, even among those who had never ridden a surfboard. Their slogans, such as "The best for your stick", included sexual innuendo. The materials confirmed their counterculture status by being banned from schools and amusement parks.

Different wax formulations are sold under the names: "Quick Humps", "Really Tacky", and "Navel Wax".

== Market expansion ==
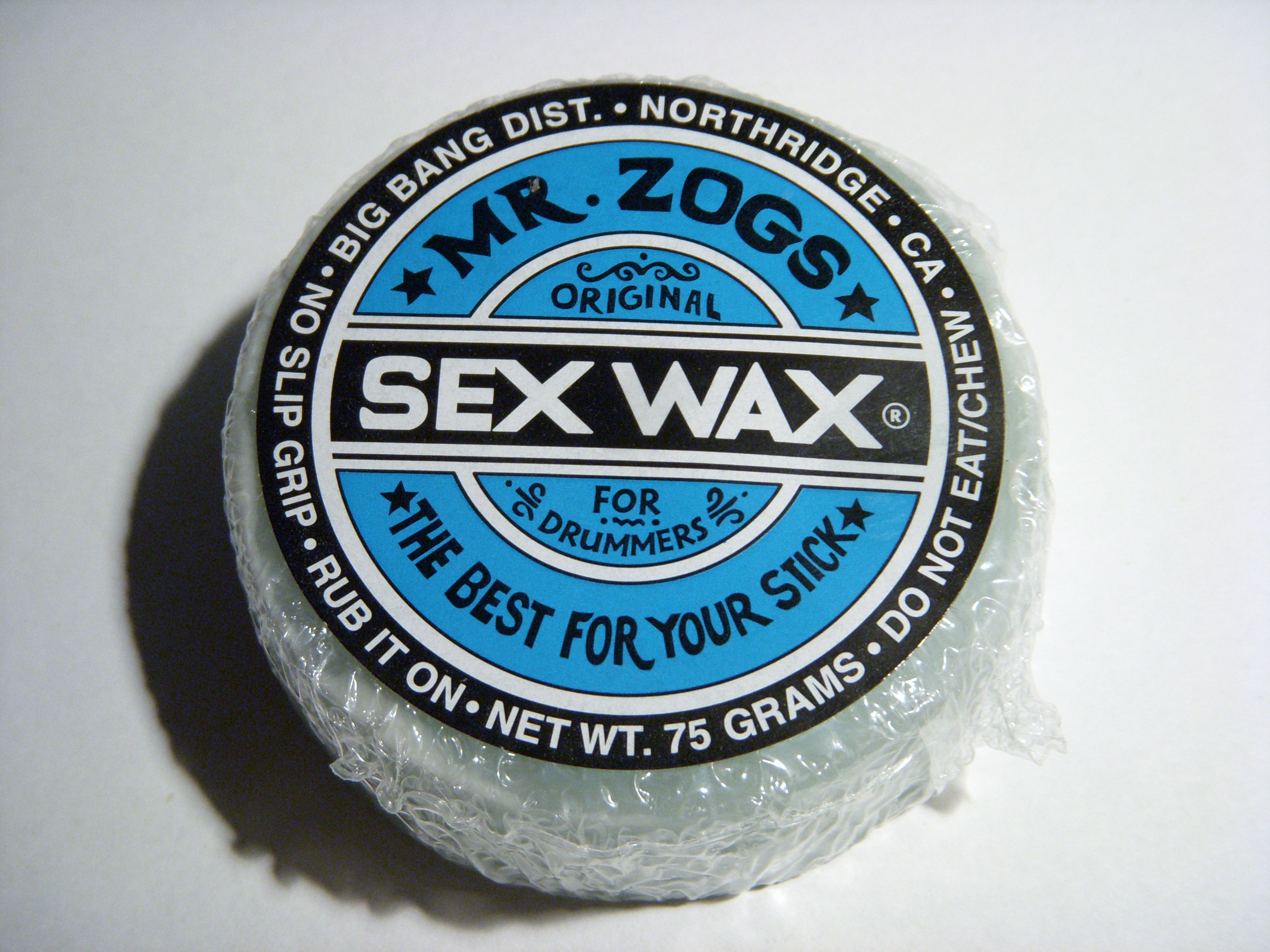
Mr. Zog's Sex Wax, for drummers

The wax is sold by Mr. Zog's, which is applied to the bottom of a snowboard to reduce friction between the snowboard and the snow. One variety is melted and applied to the bottom of the snowboard, another variety is rubbed on as a cold wax.

Mr. Zog's Sex Wax is also sold to ice hockey players. The wax is applied by rubbing it on over the tape on the blade of the stick. This does two things: it flattens the tape allowing a smoother shot, and it also makes the blade of the stick stickier, helping hockey players control the puck for stick-handling, passing, and shooting purposes. The wax also acts as a surfactant, also called surface-active agent, to aid moisture dispersion from the blade of the stick during ice hockey sessions. In addition, some goaltenders rub the wax on the shaft of the stick to help strengthen their grip when struck by hard shots, some of which exceed 100 MPH.

Sex Wax for drummers is marketed and distributed by Big Bang Distribution company.

== Product placement ==
The product has been used in a number of media productions:

- Charlie's Angels: Full Throttle. The protagonists locate a murderer by determining that he used pineapple Sex Wax on a credit card that was in turn used to break into his victim's home.
- Point Break: The protagonists determine that some bank robbers are surfers because a small amount of Sex Wax is found at the scene of the crime.
- NCIS: Featured in the episode "Bikini Wax".
- Mysterious Skin: The protagonist, played by Joseph Gordon-Levitt, wears a Mr Zogs Sex Wax logo singlet during the film.
- Fast Times at Ridgemont High. Sean Penn's character, Jeff Spicoli, wears a Mr Zogs Sex Wax shirt while walking into the cadaver room.
- Roofman. Channing Tatum's character, Jeffrey Manchester, wears a Mr Zogs Sex Wax shirt after escaping prison.
