= Paul Chavez =

American composer

Paul Chavez (aka FeltLike)
- Born: Paul Michael Chavez; 1 July 1964 (age 61); Beaumont, California, USA
- Origin: Mexico
- Genres: Experimental, Minimalism, Ambient, Electronic
- Occupations: Audio Applications, Composer, Sound Designer
- Instruments: Guitar, bass, percussion, keyboards, wind instruments, computer
- Years active: 1987–present
- Label: @pmcwaterrock
- Website: www.waterrock.org

Paul Chavez (born 1 July 1964) is a Chicano composer of dance music, and a sound designer for installation and theater. He often composes under the project name FeltLike. Chavez has worked in the Los Angeles, California area since 1990 where he did some of his first works at Los Angeles Contemporary Exhibitions where he started as a sound engineer. Chavez's music is influenced by the minimalism of Steve Reich and Paul Dresher and the experimental music of Robert Ashley and Laurie Anderson. His work has been featured at the REDCAT Theater in Los Angeles (part of the Walt Disney Concert Hall) and his recent score for the Arcane Collective's dance work Cold Dream Colour was created in collaboration with U2's The Edge.

Chavez has developed a style of composition over the past twenty years that involves creating the initial sound score independently from the choreography. The score is then brought together with the dance just prior to the performance and a sound collage is created. Often the work is mixed and modified live during the dance performance using multiple playback sources such as multitrack computers, CDs, and live instruments. He identifies with the Chicano the Rasquachismo style of art and music making, using elements of "hybridization, juxtaposition, and integration" as a means of empowerment.

== Biography ==
Chavez began writing music for dance in college at UC Santa Barbara's College of Creative Studies, where he studied with composers John Carbon, Hagar Kadima and installation artist Ann Hamilton. He received a Bachelor of Arts in Music Composition from there in 1987. A native Californian, Chavez's music is strongly influenced by his engineering, visual arts, design and architecture background.

His past performances with the group The 4GUNAS (which he co-founded with sound designers Raul Vincent Enriquez and Erik Blank) included theatrical, tableaux vivants of his design that underscored the sculptural nature of his work. Chavez has worked extensively in scoring the work of several choreographer/dancers who specialize in the Butoh style of dance, including Oguri, Roxanne Steinberg, Melinda Ring, Morleigh Steinberg, Carole Kim and Sarah Elgart.

In his work as an experience, interaction and audiovisual consultant he has worked as the technical director of Luminex, a video art event in downtown Los Angeles. He has designed numerous systems for museums and galleries, airports, and corporate facilities.

== Selected works ==
A more recent project list can be found here.

- 2012 Cold Dream Colour (collaboration with The Edge from U2) - for The Arcane Collective
- 2011 Fly Away Home - for Sarah Elgart
- 2011 Rethink LA
- 2011 Fall Water (Evening in 100 Acres) - for Oguri
- 2010 LA Beyond Cars
- 2008 Mapping Idyllwild - for Stephan Koplowitz and Task Force
- 2007 Caddy! Caddy! Caddy! - for Honeysuckle
- 2006 Drift - for Sarah Elgart
- 1994 Travelling Light - for Morleigh Steinberg
- 1994 Clerestory - for Melinda Ring, Roxanne Steinberg and Oguri
