= Arcane Collective =

Contemporary dance production company

General information
- Name: Arcane Collective
- Year founded: 2011
- Founders: Morleigh Steinberg; Oguri
- Principal venue: Dublin, Ireland
- Website: arcanecollective.com

Artistic staff
- Resident Choreographers: Liz Roche

Arcane Collective is a contemporary dance production company, producing and presenting work from a cooperative of international artists from different backgrounds. It was founded in 2011 by Morleigh Steinberg, a dancer and choreographer and Oguri, a dancer and choreographer from Japan.

Their performance Cold Dream Colour was presented in 2012, as a homage to the important Irish artist Louis le Brocquy, the performance being inspired by his paintings. Morleigh explained "He so often pays homage to different painters, and I thought, for his birthday we could pay homage to him." The music was composed by Paul Chavez and performed by U2's The Edge with choreography by Liz Roche Steinberg, the artistic director of the piece staged a solo dance as well as a duet with her sister Roxanne, wife of Oguri. Excerpts from Cold Dream Colour were performed at the Guggenheim Museum's Works & Process series in New York in 2013 and Irish broadcaster John Kelly moderated a discussion of the work with its creators.

Collaborating dancers include Cat Westwood, Boaz Barkan, Sherwood Chen, Joyce Lu and Dani Lunn and costume design by Mariad Whisker.

== Personnel ==
=== Dancers ===
- Roxanne Steinberg
- Cat Westwood
- Boaz Barkan
- Sherwood Chen
- Dani Lunn
- Joyce Lu
- Morleigh Steinberg

=== Choreographer ===
- Morleigh Steinberg
- Oguri

=== Musicians ===
- The Edge
- Paul Chavez

=== Artists ===
- Louis Le Brocquy
- Hirrokazu Kosaka
- Moses Hacmon

=== Costume designer ===
- Mariad Whisker
