= Christine Lehner =

American novelist and short story writer (born 1952)

- Born: 1952 (age 72–73); Massachusetts, United States
- Education: University of California, Santa Barbara (BA); Brown University (MA)
- Occupation: Author
- Years active: 1982–present
- Style: Novels and short stories
- Spouse: Jeffrey Richardson Hewitt (m. 1976; div. 2001)
- Children: 2
- Website: Official website

Christine Lehner (born 1952) is an American novelist and short story writer.

== Early life and education ==
Lehner was born in 1952 in Massachusetts. She attended the College of Creative Studies at the University of California, Santa Barbara and graduated with a B.A. in literature in 1973. While at UC Santa Barbara, she was a student of Marvin Mudrick. She later attended Brown University, where she graduated in 1977 with a M.A. in creative writing in 1977.

== Literary career ==
Lehner published her first novel, Expecting (ISBN 9780811208482), in 1982. She published her second work, What to Wear to See the Pope (ISBN 9780786713295), over twenty years later in 2004. Her most recent work, Absent a Miracle (ISBN 9780151014293), was released in 2009.

In 2010, Lehner was selected as a member of the first class of State University of New York at Purchase's Fellows of the Writing Center.

== Personal life ==
Lehner married fellow College of Creative Studies and University of California, Santa Barbara alumni Jeffrey Richardson Hewitt in 1976. The couple had two children, Reine and Tristram, before divorcing in 2001. She currently resides in Hastings-on-Hudson, New York.

Lehner and Hewitt endowed the Brancart Fiction Prize and the Richardson Poetry Prize for the College of Creative Studies at UC Santa Barbara in honor of their grandmothers.

Lehner has taken to bee keeping, founding Let it Bee Apiaries in 2004.
