= Morleigh Steinberg =

American choreographer and dancer

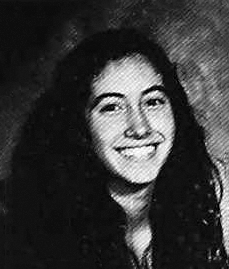
- Steinberg in 1980
- Born: October 18, 1965 (age 60); Los Angeles, California, U.S.
- Occupations: Choreographer; dancer; lighting designer; filmmaker
- Years active: 1983–present
- Spouse: The Edge (m. 2002)
- Children: 2
- Dancing career
- Current group: Arcane Collective
- Former groups: MOMIX; ISO
- Dances: Modern
- Website: arcanecollective.com

Morleigh Steinberg (born 18 October 1965) is an American choreographer and dancer with the production company Arcane Collective. She is married to The Edge, the guitarist with the band U2.

Raised in Los Angeles and schooled in modern dance, Steinberg became a member of the dancer-illusionist company MOMIX in 1983. They became known for their visual humour and contorted positions. In 1986, she co-founded ISO, a dance company that embodied an approach they called "serious fun" and sometimes collaborated with a singing group, and gave performances around the country and abroad. In both companies, she was both a choreographer and dancer. She staged her experimental dance solo production and did choreographic work for films and music videos. Starting in the mid-1990s, she branched out into lighting design and film directing on dance-related themes. She has often collaborated with Japanese choreographer and dancer Oguri, with whom she co-founded Arcane Collective, a production company.

Steinberg first became involved with U2 when she appeared in the 1987 music video for "With or Without You". She was hired as a choreographer, and subsequently as a belly dancer for the song "Mysterious Ways" during the band's Zoo TV Tour in 1992 and 1993. Her relationship with The Edge began at the end of the Zoo TV Tour. The couple married in 2002 and have two children together. They maintain residences in Ireland, France, and the United States.

== Early life and education ==
Steinberg was born and raised in Los Angeles to an affluent family. Her father, Robert, is a lawyer in Los Angeles. Her mother is an interior designer, who came from a film industry heritage and grew up on the Universal Studios lot. She has two sisters, older sister Roxanne and younger sister Eliza. Her family is Jewish.

Steinberg was tutored in modern dance and her instructors included Bella Lewitzky. Steinberg attended Beverly Hills High School" where she was part of its Advanced Dance Group which gave modern dance performances. At age 16, she spent time at the Interlochen Arts Academy in Michigan and when 17, left with her sister for a year of dancing in Paris. She also attended Hampshire College in Amherst, Massachusetts, for two weeks. She later said that her training in dance had "stressed relationships to objects and to poems."

== Career ==
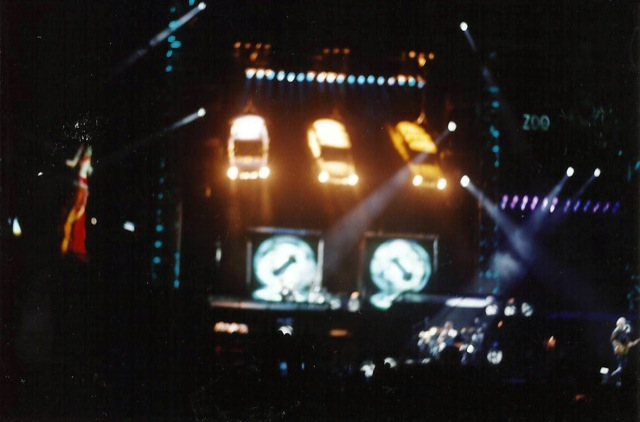
Steinberg the belly dancer (left), as seen on the Zoo TV Tour

In 1983, Steinberg began dancing in the studio of Moses Pendleton, who founded the modern dance company Pilobolus. She was attracted to Pilobolus growing up, saying, "I was taller than most girls my age, and I thought that was a company I could be with because the women were always lifting the men." There she joined up with Daniel Ezralow, Jamey Hampton, and Ashley Roland, and the four created the Connecticut-based, dancer-illusionist company MOMIX. From 1983 to 1986, Steinberg toured nationally with MOMIX, and the group became known for its visual humour, contorted positions, and Trompe-l'œil effects.

The dancers felt financially insecure, however, because Pendleton owned the MOMIX name, and also felt artistically stagnant. The four split from MOMIX in 1986 and founded the ISO ("I'm So Optimistic") dance company. With ISO, they set their acro dance moves against the new-wave a cappella singing of The Bobs in combined performances. The dancers labelled their new approach as "serious fun".

Steinberg's first association with U2 was in February 1987. The group's lead singer, Bono, was a fan of ISO and she was cast for the music video of their hit "With or Without You". In it, director Matt Mahurin portrayed Steinberg in an abstract style, swirling in various positions in shots interposed with the band performing. During a Los Angeles stop on the band's subsequent Joshua Tree Tour, Steinberg met The Edge (actual name Dave Evans) in person for the first time during a party at her house. He came and had a conversation with her and her sister.

Steinberg did choreographic work for two feature films, Earth Girls Are Easy (1988) and Wild Orchid (1990). She did the choreography for Paula Abdul's 1991–1992 Under My Spell Tour. She additionally did concert or music video choreographic work for David Bowie, Rod Stewart, Sting, and Lenny Kravitz. She also ran her own dance school.

By 1990, ISO was performing not just in the US but also abroad. The troupe was regularly reviewed by The New York Times. A 1988 review said that, "Unfortunately, many of [the troupe's] effects looked too self-consciously clever." A 1990 review concluded that, "It is easy to be optimistic about ISO; its shows are goofy fun. But the apparently casual silliness derives from great theatrical shrewdness." A 1991 review said that, "The evening got off to a good, punchy start, then dwindled irretrievably into sophomoric hijinks." A 1993 review stated that, "Iso is after laughs and it gets them. But its targets are threadbare just when dance could use some sharp satirists." In one 1990 performance, Steinberg used elastic bands to playfully reshape her arms and legs as noodles, then flew from wires like an angel. By 1992, Steinberg was living in the Venice neighborhood of Los Angeles. She sometimes toured with the informal company Daniel Ezralow and Friends. A St. Louis Post-Dispatch review of one such show in 1994 described Steinberg's role as that of "a gorgeous, aloof woman in a red dress". She also performed a solo work, the 1992 experimental show called XRAYD at the La Boca performance space in Los Angeles, which featured original music from Brian Eno and Paul Chavez. The work featured her in a variety of strange poses and settings cued by video and lighting effects. The Los Angeles Times said her composition represented "a descent into autism, achieved with frightening integrity. Everything she reveals is without self, the be-all and end-all of madness."

After meeting U2 in 1987, Steinberg stayed in touch with Bono and when the group was putting the Zoo TV Tour together in 1992, the lead singer thought it would be good to have a choreographer to critique his moves on stage. Steinberg worked during the tour's pre-production to show the group how to communicate their ideas all the way to the last rows of a venue. Recognizing Bono was not a dancer, she focused on movements he could do, and sought to help him pace himself and not get lost visually in the show's enormous stage set. The group's hit "Mysterious Ways" had featured a belly dancer in its music video, and the group decided to incorporate one in their on-stage performance of the song. The original dancer left when the tour moved to its outdoor stadium legs. According to Steinberg, having a belly dancer on the tour originated as "a bit of a joke". Steinberg began by training the dancer, and when that dancer left the tour, a replacement was needed. Bono asked Steinberg if she would like to take over and she agreed, although she had never belly danced before and by her own description did not have the voluptuous body usually associated with the form.

In the role of belly dancer, Steinberg engaged in dramatic interaction with Bono, especially upon entrance and exit from the stage. Bono at times sang to the belly dancer's image on the giant video screens around the stage. During the tour, Steinberg changed the colours of her outfit to match certain occasions, such as wearing orange and black around Halloween. Steinberg was originally reluctant to put her own activities on hold to continue on to the "Zooropa" leg of the tour, but eventually agreed. Unlike others in the tour entourage, Steinberg exhibited a professional independence from the group and did not wait on their whims. In 1993, while still on tour, Steinberg appeared in U2's Kevin Godley-directed music video for their single "Numb", first with her feet as part of the video's assault on The Edge and then with her back as she belly danced.

Morleigh Steinberg has been working together with Japanese choreographer and dancer Oguri since the early 1990s, documenting Oguri's Butoh-derived style of dance in various environments, including Joshua Tree National Park and Los Angeles. She made her directorial debut in 1994 with the short subject Traveling Light, which featured the interpretive dance of Oguri and her sister Roxanne, who is also a modern dancer and choreographer and married to Oguri. A review of the film on DVD Talk said that "Moreleigh Steinberg's dance-filled daydream about relationships in freefall will be difficult for some to appreciate (the mostly modern dance is very insular and odd), but the brilliant cinematic mood created by the director helps us over the slightly strange nature of it all." (In 2006 the film was included in a DVD release of the Francis Ford Coppola-produced claymation film of William S. Burroughs' The Junky's Christmas.) Despite having no formal training in it, Steinberg also began working as a lighting designer, serving in that role for 1995 and 1997 productions of Oguri works. In 1999, Steinberg was selected for a ten-week National Dance/Media Project fellowship at the University of California, Los Angeles.

Steinberg next came up with the idea of showing Oguri moving through two busy Los Angeles intersections. The result is the 11-minute dance film "Xing", which was screened in 2003 at the Getty Center during Dance Camera West. "Nothing was choreographed beforehand. Oguri does not choreograph, he improvises. But the shots are very specific and the direction is very specific. He knows that he has to get from point A to point B, but I do not mind how." Steinberg made her first feature-length documentary, Height of Sky, about Oguri, and it was shown on the Sundance Channel in 2008.

Since Steinberg settled in Ireland, she has been involved in a number of projects, including doing the lighting for a Royal Hibernian Academy fringe gallery exhibition in 2001 and for Rex Levitates' dance production Bread & Circus in 2007, which showcases her collaborator Liz Roche. A short dance film she directed, Unsung, which featured Roche's choreography, won a 2008 Dance on the Box award from RTÉ and was shown on that channel as part of the Dublin Dance Festival. Steinberg provided the inspiration behind the dropped-from-on-high steering-wheel microphone that was a striking visual feature of the 2009–2011 U2 360° Tour.

She was the artistic director of the 2010s Dance Homage to Irish painter Louis le Brocquy, entitled Cold Dream Colour. The work had its world première in Dublin. Le Brocquy later died, in 2012. The Edge had brought le Brocquy's work to Steinberg's attention, and she became convinced that his paintings could be interpreted through dance. The music for Cold Dream Colour is composed by The Edge in collaboration with Paul Chavez (known for his experimental electronic compositions under the project name FeltLike). Besides sharing in the choreography and lighting design for the work, Steinberg also staged a solo dance as well as a duet with her sister. Oguri also had roles as choreographer and dancer. The work had its US première at REDCAT in Los Angeles in 2012; a review in the Los Angeles Times said that "Visceral expressionism and a prodigious visual beauty coalesced ... a striking visual success", but that it was less certain whether the nature of le Brocquy's paintings had been conveyed to the less-familiar American audience. Excerpts from Cold Dream Colour were performed at the Guggenheim Museum's Works & Process series for two nights in 2013 in New York, with Irish broadcaster John Kelly moderating a discussion of the work with its creators. The US Cold Dream Colour was presented by Arcane Collective, a production company that Steinberg and Oguri had co-founded in Spring 2011. Steinberg continued to direct and appear in productions of Arcane Collective, including a 2016 performance at New York Live Arts consisting of adaptations of scenes from the Samuel Beckett trilogy.

In 2017, Steinberg was featured as the second of two women in the video accompanying performances of the song "Trip Through Your Wires" on U2's Joshua Tree Tour 2017. She is dressed as a cowgirl, often drawing stage comment from Bono, while an American flag is painted on a wooden shack by the other woman.

== Personal life ==
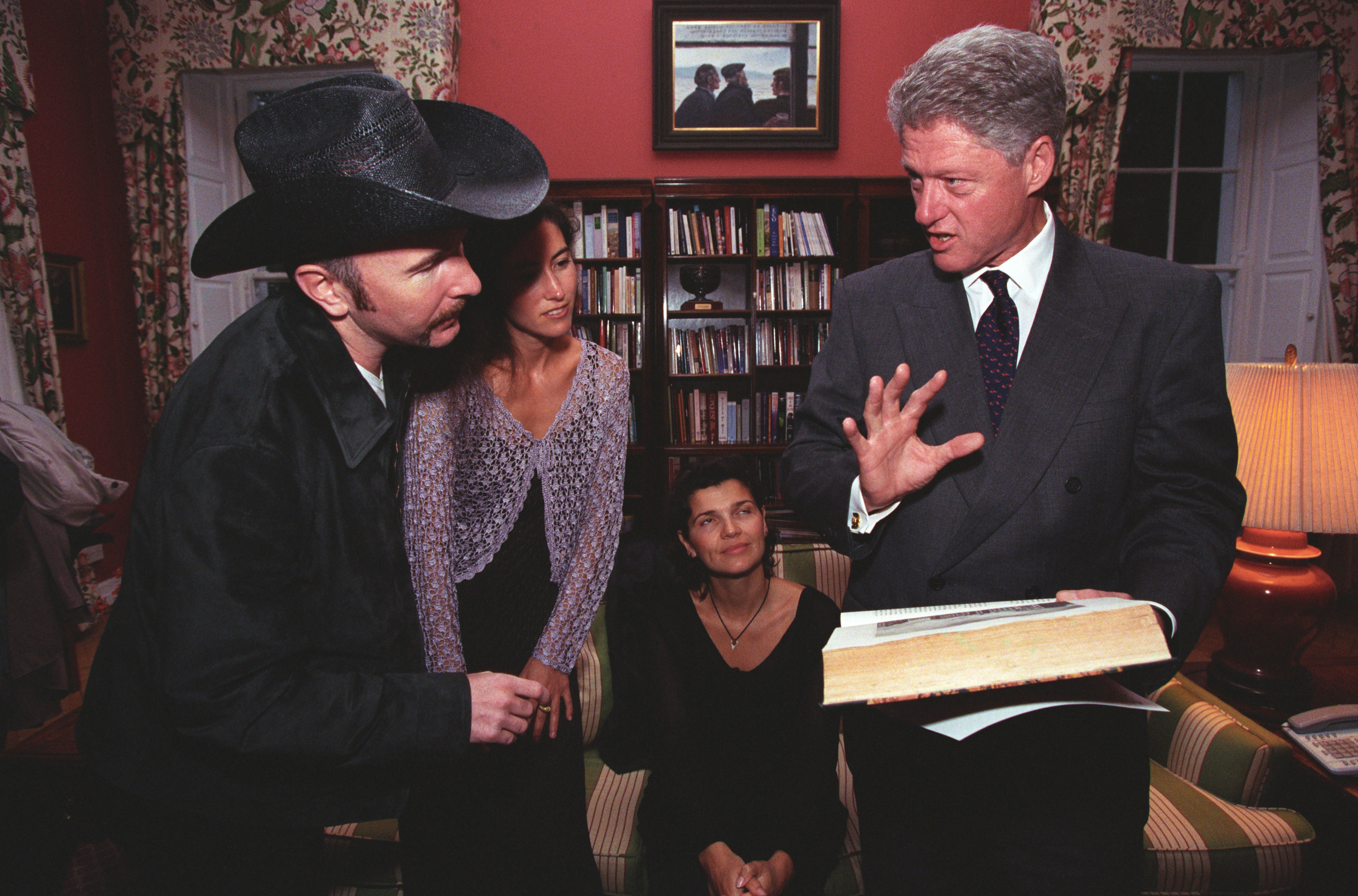
Steinberg (second from left) with The Edge, Ali Hewson, and U.S. President Bill Clinton in 1998

"All of us had fallen in love with Morleigh, she has a very easy way about her. She is a Californian in all the ways that you love California, a bright light in a very low-key way. Edge fell for her. It was that thing that often happens when people fall in love, they were friends before they were lovers."

— Bono, on Steinberg and The Edge's relationship

The Edge married his first wife Aislinn in 1983. They had three children, but separated in March 1991. Steinberg and The Edge developed a friendship during the Zoo TV Tour, and toward the tour's end in 1993, the friendship developed into a relationship, and Steinberg broke up with her boyfriend of the time. Following the tour's completion, Steinberg and The Edge discovered they missed each other, so she moved to Dublin in 1994, and the relationship became firm. Having grown up around Hollywood, the prospect of being associated with a famous rock star did not faze her. On his part, the relationship with Steinberg improved his frame of mind after a long period of unhappiness.

The couple's daughter, Sian Beatrice, was born in Los Angeles in 1997 and their son, Levi, was born in 1999 in the same city. Steinberg had kept her home and many of her possessions in Los Angeles after moving to Dublin; only after she began raising her children in Ireland did she start feeling that country was her home.

Steinberg continued some professional activity with U2, directing one of the music videos made for the 1997 single "Staring at the Sun". The video featured close-ups of each of the band members set off by an array of lighting effects. Following the September 11 attacks, she was one of the backing singers on the song "Walk On" for the America: A Tribute to Heroes telethon.

The couple married on 17 June 2002 in a small civil service at the Dublin registry office, and a few days later in a ceremony atop a mountain in the South of France. The Edge said, "The Dublin ceremony was just a necessary formality." The only people present were his two best men: Bono and antiques dealer Chantal O'Sullivan. Four days later, their French wedding was held with 200 or more guests at the hilltop village of Èze overlooking the Côte d'Azur followed by a seaside reception. The ceremony was led by Steinberg's father Robert and combined elements of both Christian and Jewish traditions.

The couple bought and renovated a €4 million house in Killiney outside Dublin during 2002–2003, where they lived for their children's primary education. Their daughter Sian had leukaemia at age 7, which required three years of treatment, in Dublin and in California. After discussion with the family, U2 went forward with its 2005–2006 Vertigo Tour, but changed scheduling and reduced dates to enable The Edge to go home more often. Bono later called Steinberg a heroine for having to take up the parental burden and said that without her, the tour would never have taken place. After Sian was declared free of leukaemia, Steinberg and The Edge learned that she was dyslexic and relocated to New York where she could attend a special learning centre.

Along with Bono and his wife Ali Hewson, the couple co-owns a 20-room villa in Èze in the Alpes-Maritimes in the South of France, where they often host other celebrities. By 2010, Steinberg and The Edge had residences in Dublin, New York, the South of France and Los Angeles. The couple spent five years seeking to gain approval for a large, five-home development atop the Sweetwater Mesa hillside in Malibu, California on land they had bought. Opposed by environmentalists, it was rejected by the California Coastal Commission in 2011, despite the efforts of Robert Steinberg to argue on its behalf. The project was reactivated and the battle intensified again in 2014. Finally, in 2016, the couple received approval from the commission based on a revised design. However, the Sierra Club filed suit against the project.
