= Ani Kavafian =

American musician (born 1948)

- Born: May 10, 1948 (age 77); Istanbul, Turkey
- Genres: Classical
- Occupation(s): Performer, educator
- Instrument: Violin

Ani Kavafian (Armenian: Անի Գավաֆեան, born May 10, 1948, Istanbul) is a classical violinist and professor at the Yale School of Music.

== Early life and education ==
Born in Istanbul of Armenian heritage, Ani Kavafian began piano lessons at the age of three. After immigrating to the United States in 1956, she began violin studies in Detroit, Michigan with Ara Zerounian and then with Mischa Mischakoff. She went on to study at the Juilliard School with Ivan Galamian receiving a Master of Science degree.

== Career ==
In 1973, she was a winner of the Young Concert Artists International Auditions, where she now serves as president of their Alumni Association. In 1979, she was the recipient of the Avery Fisher Career Grant. The same year, she became a member of the Chamber Music Society of Lincoln Center; she continues to tour the United States, Canada and Europe with CMS. Her affiliation there is the longest tenure of any artist of the Society.

She has appeared with the New York Philharmonic, the Philadelphia and Cleveland orchestras, as well as the Los Angeles and Saint Paul chamber orchestras. As a recitalist, she has performed at New York's Carnegie Hall and Alice Tully Hall, as well as in various venues across the United States. Ani and her sister, violinist Ida Kavafian have performed together around the country in recitals and as soloists with several orchestras.

Over the years, Ani has taught at the Mannes School of Music and the Manhattan School of Music, Queens College, McGill University, and Stony Brook University. She was appointed as a full professor in the Practice of Violin at Yale University in 2006. Kavafian is in great demand as a visiting professor conducting master classes around the country and online, as well as workshops in Korea, Japan and China.

Ani Kavafian is married to artist Bernard Mindich. Her instrument is the 1736 “Muir-McKenzie” Stradivarius.

== Awards ==
- “Inspiring Yale” Award, 2018
- Interlochen “Path of Inspiration” Award, 2003
- Avery Fisher Career Grant, 1976
- Young Concert Artists, 1973
- Concert Artists Guild, 1971

== Discography ==
- "Ani Kavafian with Charles Wadsworth" in works by Fritz Kreisler (Musical Heritage Society, 1975)
- Wolfgang Amadeus Mozart: Duo for Violin & Viola / Moritz Moszkowski: Suite for Two Violin & Piano / Pablo de Sarasate: Navarra for Two Violin & Piano. Ida Kavafian, violin, viola; Ani Kavafian, violin; Jonathan Feldman, piano (Nonesuch, 1986)
- Henri Lazarof: Divertimento III for Solo Violin & Strings. Ani Kavafian, violin; Gerard Schwarz, conducting Seattle Symphony (JVC Music, 1998)
- “The Chamber Music of Claude Debussy.” The Chamber Music Society of Lincoln Center (Delos International, 2000)
- Tod Machover: Hyperstring Trilogy. Matt Haimovitz, hypercello; Kim Kashkashian, hyperviola; Ani Kavafian, hyperviolin; with the voice of Carol Bennett; Gil Rose, conducting Boston Modern Orchestra Project (Oxingale Records, 2003)
- Johann Sebastian Bach: Six Sonatas for violin and fortepiano. Ani Kavafian, violin; Kenneth Cooper, fortepiano. (Kleos Classics, 2004)
- Wolfgang Amadeus Mozart: Violin Sonatas K. 301, K. 378, K. 380 and K. 526. Ani Kavafian, violin; Jorge Federico Osorio, piano (Artek, 2006)
- Arno Babajanian: Piano Trio / Violin Sonata. Avo Kuyumjian, piano; Ani Kavafian, violin; Suren Bagratuni, cello (Marco Polo, 2009)
- Paul Chihara: Love Music by Ani Kavafian (Albany, 2011)
- Aaron Copland: Sextet. The Chamber Music Society of Lincoln Center (Delos Productions Inc. 2012)
