= Karen Chin =

American paleontologist and taphonomist

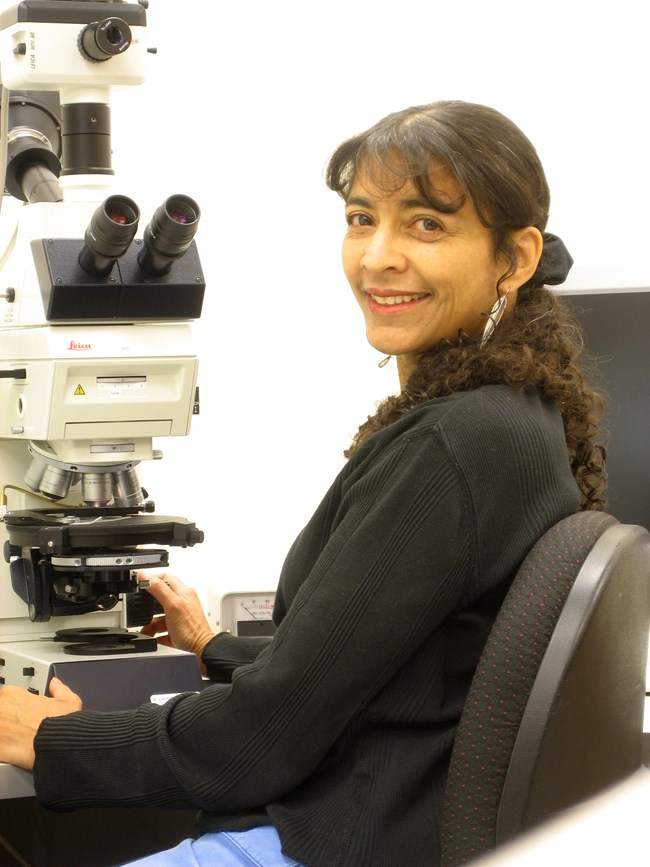
- Chin in 2008
- Education: University of California San Diego (BS); Montana State University (MS); University of California, Santa Barbara (PhD)
- Known for: Coprolite Research
- Scientific career
- Fields: Paleontology
- Workplaces: University of Colorado, Boulder, University of Colorado Museum of Natural History
- Thesis: The paleobiological implications of herbivorous dinosaur coprolites: Ichnologic, petrographic, and organic geochemical investigations (1996)
- Doctoral advisor: Bruce H. Tiffney
- Other academic advisors: Jack Horner (MS)

Karen Chin is an American paleontologist and taphonomist who is considered one of the world's leading experts in coprolites.

== Early life and education ==
As a college student at University of California San Diego, she worked as a nature interpreter for the National Park Service.

When Chin was in graduate school at Montana State University, studying modern grasslands, she took a job at the Museum of the Rockies. There Chin worked with Jack Horner and preparing fossils from the Two Medicine Formation for study. She began by slicing newly unearthed maiasaura bones for Horner to study with a microscope. Among the fossil were eggs and nests and unusual "blobs" that had not yet been identified. Chin asked to be the one to study these fossils and her research would confirm her hypothesis that they were coprolites.

This experience convinced Chin to study fossils.

She notes that due to her gender and racial identity, she is unusual in her field, saying:

I was an atypical student when I began my academic career in paleontology because I was female, a person of color (Black, Chinese, plus...), and older than most students entering graduate school. Yet ironically, the people that have been important mentors to me are three white men who had confidence in my abilities and offered critical guidance on my academic journey. The generous counsel of these scientists helped me succeed. In turn, I am happy to demonstrate that paleontologists can come in all colors and flavors.

After her Masters, Chin went on to receive her PhD in Geological Sciences from University of California, Santa Barbara in 1996 where she was advised by Bruce H. Tiffney.

== Career and research ==
Chin is a professor at the University of Colorado, Boulder, and Curator of Paleontology at the University of Colorado Museum of Natural History. Her research focuses on how the structure and dynamics of ancient ecosystems of the Mesozoic era differ from our modern era. Specifically, she studies how ancient organisms may have interacted and what that tells us about the climatic conditions at the time.

== Awards and achievements ==
- Dr. Chin has authored two children's books: Dino Dung (Step into Reading) in 2005 and The Clues Are in the Poo: The Story of Dinosaur Scientist Karen Chin in 2023.
- In 2023, Dr. Chin was awarded the Geological Society of America Bromery Award for making significant contributions to geological sciences and advancing the contributions of underrepresented communities to geosciences through her extensive outreach.
- Dr. Chin has been featured in National Geographic, The Washington Post, and the NOVA television show. She also spoke on Science Friday on "Why Dinosaurs Matter".

== Selected publications ==
- Chin, Karen; Feldmann, Rodney M.; Tashman, Jessica N. "Consumption of crustaceans by megaherbivorous dinosaurs: dietary flexibility and dinosaur life history strategies". Scientific Reports. 7.
- Chin, K., Hartman, J.H., and Roth, B. 2009. Opportunistic exploitation of dinosaur dung: fossil snails in coprolites from the Upper Cretaceous Two Medicine Formation of Montana. Lethaia 42: 185–198.
- Chin, K., Bloch, J.D., Sweet, A.R., Tweet, J.S., Eberle, J.J., Cumbaa, S.L., Witkowski, J., and Harwood, D.M. 2008. Life in a temperate polar sea: a unique taphonomic window on the structure of a Late Cretaceous Arctic marine ecosystem. Proceedings of the Royal Society B 275: 2675–2685.
- Tweet, J.S., Chin, K., Braman, D.R., and Murphy, N.L. 2008. Probable gut contents within a specimen of Brachylophosaurus canadensis (Dinosauria: Hadrosauridae) from the Upper Cretaceous Judith River Formation of Montana. PALAIOS 23: 625–636.
- Chin, K. 2007. The paleobiological implications of herbivorous dinosaur coprolites from the Upper Cretaceous Two Medicine Formation of Montana: why eat wood? Palaios 22: 554–566.
- Chin, K., and Bishop, J. 2007. Exploited twice: bored bone in a theropod coprolite from the Jurassic Morrison Formation of Utah, U.S. In: Bromley, R.G., Buatois, L.A., Mángano, M.G., Genise, J.F., and Melchor, R.N. [eds.], Sediment-Organism Interactions: A Multifaceted Ichnology. SEPM Special Publications, v. 88, pp. 377–385.
- Chin, K., Tokaryk, T.T., Erickson, G.M., Calk, L.C., 1998, A king-sized theropod coprolite, Nature v. 393, pp. 680–682.
