= Bruce Tiffney =

American paleontologist (born 1949)

Bruce H. Tiffney
- Born: July 3, 1949 (age 77); Massachusetts
- Education: Harvard; Boston University
- Scientific career
- Fields: Paleobotany
- Workplaces: University of California, Santa Barbara
- Doctoral advisor: Elso Barghoorn
- Doctoral students: Karen Chin

Bruce Haynes Tiffney is an American paleobotanist, professor, and the former dean of the College of Creative Studies at the University of California, Santa Barbara. He graduated from Boston University with a degree in geology in 1971, and after earning his PhD at Harvard University in 1977, he became a professor of biology at Yale University, where he taught for nine years, and where he also worked as a curator of the D. C. Eaton Herbarium and paleontological collections at the Peabody Museum of Natural History. His research focuses on the evolution of flowering plants (angiosperms) in the fossil record. He identified the first Cretaceous flower in the 1970s in sediment from Martha's Vineyard in the USA, but was seen as an exceptional discovery.

Tiffney is a fellow of the Geological Society of America, and appeared on the documentary series The Future Is Wild.

He is known for his wizard's hat.
