= William Dole (artist) =

American artist

- Born: 1917; Angola, Indiana
- Died: 1983 (aged 65–66); Santa Barbara
- Education: University of California, Berkeley
- Known for: Watercolor and Collage

William Dole (1917–1983) was an American collagist and teacher.

== Early life ==
Dole was born in Angola, Indiana in 1917. Dole studied English literature at Olivet College and later finished a degree in art history, apprenticing with George Rickey. Dole moved to Oakland, California in 1941 to study at Mills College and joined the United States Army Air Corps the following year, where he served until 1945.

== Career ==
Dole worked briefly in the advertising industry before beginning graduate studies in art at University of California, Berkeley in 1946 and lecturing there in 1947. In 1949, Dole became an assistant professor at University of California, Santa Barbara; he would become department chair in 1958 and full professor in 1962. He was named to the American Academy of Arts and Letters.

== Work ==
Dole's art was largely watercolor-based until he took a sabbatical in Florence, Italy in 1955, at which point he began to work in collage by incorporating Italian landscape elements. Dole was inspired by the collages and assemblages of Georges Braque, Kurt Schwitters and Joseph Cornell. Dole was also Mary Heebner's mentor.

Dole's collages were described as Cubist and Dadaist, and as geometrical in form. His work often featured words, letters, and other textual elements. His work was considered influential in the Santa Barbara collage scene, and was highly regarded by New York Times art critic John Russell.

Dole's work was shown in the Santa Barbara Museum of Art beginning in 1976 and was exhibited in other major cities. His work was also shown in Felix Landau's art gallery. A portion of his collection resides at the University of California, Santa Barbara.

== Personal life ==
Dole married Kathryn Dole in 1941. They lived in Santa Barbara and Hollister Ranch for some time. They had seven children and many grandchildren. Dole died in 1983 in Santa Barbara.
