= Macduff Everton =

American photographer (born 1947)

- Born: August 13, 1947 (age 79); Pearl River, New York, U.S.
- Education: University of California, Santa Barbara (B.A. 1981, M.F.A. 1984)
- Spouses: Ruth Everton (m. 1968; div. 1973) Mary Heebner (m. 1989)
- Children: 1
- Website: macduffeverton.com

Macduff Everton (born August 13, 1947) is an American photographer, known for his work with the Maya primarily on the Yucatán Peninsula.

== Early life and education ==
Macduff Everton was born on August 13, 1947, in Pearl River, New York, to missionaries. Everton moved with his family to Oregon when he was one year old. He would eventually land in Santa Barbara, California, when his father, Clyde, became a pastor at Trinity Episcopal Church. He attended Santa Barbara High School before leaving to explore the world.

While hitchhiking on his journey at age 17, he picked up a camera on a Danish street abandoned by an American who didn't want to appear as a tourist; the resulting images were the first he was able to successfully sell in Japan.

Everton returned to the United States at 19 years old and landed a job with an educational film company to create college-level archaeological and anthropological filmstrips in Latin America. This led to Everton's introduction to the Maya people in Mexico's Yucatán Peninsula. To support his documentary projects about the Maya and their culture, he took seasonal jobs such as wrangler, muleteer, and white-water rafting river guide.

Everton would spend six months at a time in the backcountry, then return to the Yucatán, and finally the University of California, Santa Barbara, where he earned a B.A. in 1981 from the College of Creative Studies and an M.F.A. in 1984 when he was in his mid-30s.

== Career ==
Everton's first trip to the Yucatán was in 1967. His 1991 book, The Modern Maya: A Culture in Transition, shed light on the Maya people during globalization and critical change. In 2012, the University of Texas Press published The Modern Maya: Incidents of Travel and Friendship in Yucatán. He updated readers on the modern Maya people from his previous book and viewed the effects of racism, tourism, and drugs, among others. Everton has chronicled the lives of his Maya friends and their families over a 40-year span. As he wrote, "While most history chronicles the famous, this book is about the lives of ordinary people who are the soul of their culture."

Everton is also considered a master of panoramic photography. His magnum opus is his work with the living Maya on the Yucatán Peninsula. His appreciation of light and weather, coupled with his observational skills, have been attributed to his time living in rural areas. Everton shares a sense of place through his photographs, whether portraits depict individuals or landscapes.

Everton's works are in the public collections of Bibliothèque nationale de France, British Museum, International Center of Photography, Museum of Modern Art, Los Angeles County Museum of Art, Musée de l'Élysée, and Museo de Arte Moderno.

=== Writings ===
He has contributed to several archaeological books by other authors, including The Code of Kings: The Language of Seven Sacred Mayan Temples and Tombs, Maya Cosmos: Three Thousand Years on the Shaman's Path, and The Cities of Ancient Mexico: Reconstructing a Lost World.

=== Editorial work ===
Hired originally by editors for his fine art eye, Everton earned a reputation as a photographer who knew how to travel. He has previously worked with several print and online publications, including Condé Nast Traveler, Life, Los Angeles, The New York Times Magazine, Outside, and Smithsonian. He is a contributing editor and photographer at National Geographic Traveler, where he has photographed stories from Beijing to Big Sur.

== Critical reception ==
Peter Galassi, director of photography at Museum of Modern Art, noted the playful creativity of Everton's early artistic exploration: “Macduff Everton's series of fotoverigraphs is an unusually imaginative and witty piece of work. No academic could offer a more persuasive demonstration of the elasticity of photographic meaning -- or one so full of pleasure and surprise.” An early champion of his landscape portraiture, The New York Times photography critic and curator Andy Grundberg wrote, “Macduff Everton updates travel photography in the same way that Ansel Adams updated 19th-century photography of the West. He captures strange and eloquent moments in which time, and the world, seem to stand still.”

== Personal life ==
Everton lives in Santa Barbara, California. He married Mary Heebner, also a University of California, Santa Barbara College of Creative Studies alumna, in 1989. Past artistic collaborations include The Western Horizon and Patagonia, La Última Esperanza. They were featured in director Russ Spencer's Full Circle, a documentary about their collaboration on The Western Horizon.

He was married in 1968 to Ruth Everton, but the couple divorced in February 1973. Everton has a son from the previous marriage, Robert Everton.

== Published works ==
- The Modern Maya: Incidents of Travel and Friendship in Yucatán (University of Texas Press, 2012) ISBN 9780292726932
- Patagonia: La Ultima Esperanza (University of Texas Press, 2012) ISBN 9780938531029
- The Book of Santa Barbara (Tixcacalcupul Press, 2010) ISBN 9780982927007
- The Western Horizon (Harry N. Abrams, 2000) ISBN 978-0-8109-4562-3
- The Modern Maya: A Culture in Transition (University of New Mexico Press, 1991) ISBN 978-0-8263-1240-2
- That’s Not Entirely True: An Album of Fotoverigraphs (Tixcacalcupul Press, 1986) ISBN 978-0-938531-01-2
- El Circo Mágico Modelo (Carolrhoda Books, 1979) ISBN 978-0-87614-106-9
- Birdmen of Papantla (Ward Ritchie Press, 1972) ISBN 978-0-378-60453-6
