= Mary Heebner =

American artist and author (born 1951)

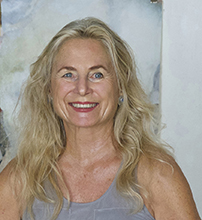
- Heebner in 2019.
- Born: April 19, 1951 (age 74); Burbank, California, United States
- Education: University of California, Santa Barbara (B.A. 1981, M.F.A. 1977)
- Occupations: Artist and author
- Spouses: Steven E. Craig (m. 1972) Macduff Everton (m. 1989)
- Children: 1
- Website: maryheebner.com

Mary Doretta Heebner (born April 19, 1951) is an American artist and author.

== Early life and education ==
Heebner was born on April 19, 1951, in Burbank, California, to Claire Lucille Menei and Walter Schussler Heebner. Her father, Walter, was a professional musician, composer, and songwriter, then as an executive at RCA Records and Capitol Records. Mary Heebner attended Providence High School during which she was a part-time studio assistant to Corita Kent at Immaculate Heart High School. Heebner credits Kent as an influence in her career and Heebner would also make occasional contact with Daniel Berrigan while at Immaculate Heart.

She attended the University of California, Santa Barbara's College of Creative Studies and graduated with a B.A. in 1973. She also received her M.F.A. from UC Santa Barbara in 1977, working with mentor William Dole.

== Career ==
Heebner's work has been in both private and public collections including: San Francisco Museum of Modern Art, the National Gallery of Art, the National Museum of Women in the Arts, the Library of Congress, the British Library, the New York Public Library, Stanford University, Dartmouth College, Columbia University, University of Chicago, University of Michigan, Indiana University, and Santa Barbara Museum of Art.

She founded Simplemente Maria Press in 1995, which produces limited edition artist's books that combine her paintings and writing. Heebner has collaborated with writers for several artists books including a book based on Hamlet by William Shakespeare, Pablo Neruda, Sienna Craig, Michael Hannon, Stephen Kessler and Clayton Eshleman. HarperCollins published trade editions of two of Heebner's artist's books that paired her paintings with the poems of Pablo Neruda, which featured translations by Scottish writer Alastair Reid, printed in honor of the poet's 100th birthday. The first book, On the Blue Shore of Silence, was followed in 2008 by a companion volume, Intimacies.

Heebner has an abiding interest in antiquity. In 1995 she wrote and illustrated a monograph, Old Marks, New Marks, with an essay by Carolyn Radlo, linking her practice to ancient mark making. In 1997, the French minister of culture invited her to visit the Lascaux cave, which has been closed to the public since 1963. This inspired a series of paintings and an artist's book, Scratching the Surface: a visit to Lascaux and Rouffignac, which prompted an invitation to revisit Lascaux. A visit to Angkor and Ayutthaya led to large installation pieces ("Bodhisattvas at Ayutthaya" and "Ancient Presences" and three artist books (Full Lotus, Bayon: Sketches from Bayon Temple, Angkor Thom, and Silent Faces/Angkor) and the series Geography of A Face: Khymer. Repeated visits to Patagonia in Chile resulted in a book, a series of paintings, and an artist book Unearthed. Intimacy: Drawing with Light, Drawn from Stone, an exploration of the drawing process using watermarks, original text and images based on Classical Roman sculptures. Cassandra is a hand painted accordion fold book referencing Greek myth, and poetry by Stephen Kessler. Arctic Trilogy, original text and images based on expeditions to the Arctic in 2017 and 2024.

Other publications include: Bridging Image and Word: 25 Years of Artists Books, 1995-2020. The Venus Paintings (Edward Cella Art+Architecture, 2013). Patagonia: La Ultima Esperanza, (Tixcacalulpul Press, 2011) by Heebner and Macduff Everton. Intimacies/Intimismos: Poems of Love by Pablo Neruda, translated by Alastair Reid (Harper Collins/Rayo, 2008). On the Blue Shore of Silence: Poems of the Sea by Pablo Neruda, translated by Alastair Reid, commentary by Antonio Skármeta (Harper Collins/Rayo, 2004). The Western Horizon, Heebner/Everton (Abrams, 2000).

Heebner's interest in Classical sculpture influenced a series of large paintings including the Venus Paintings, exhibited in 2013, of which Dr. Bruce Robertson has written, "Heebner had miraculously rescued these sculptures from the museums she has seen them in and returned them to the world they came from, a world of change, accident, thick encrustations and vaporous atmosphere."

== Personal life ==
Heebner resides in Santa Barbara, California, with photographer and husband Macduff Everton, whom she married in 1989 and shares a stepson.

She had previously married Steven E. Craig on March 11, 1972. Craig, her first husband, Heebner met while in high school working together at Universal Studios Hollywood. They were married for 13 years and share a daughter.
