= Surfboard wax =

Substance that helps the surfer stay on the board

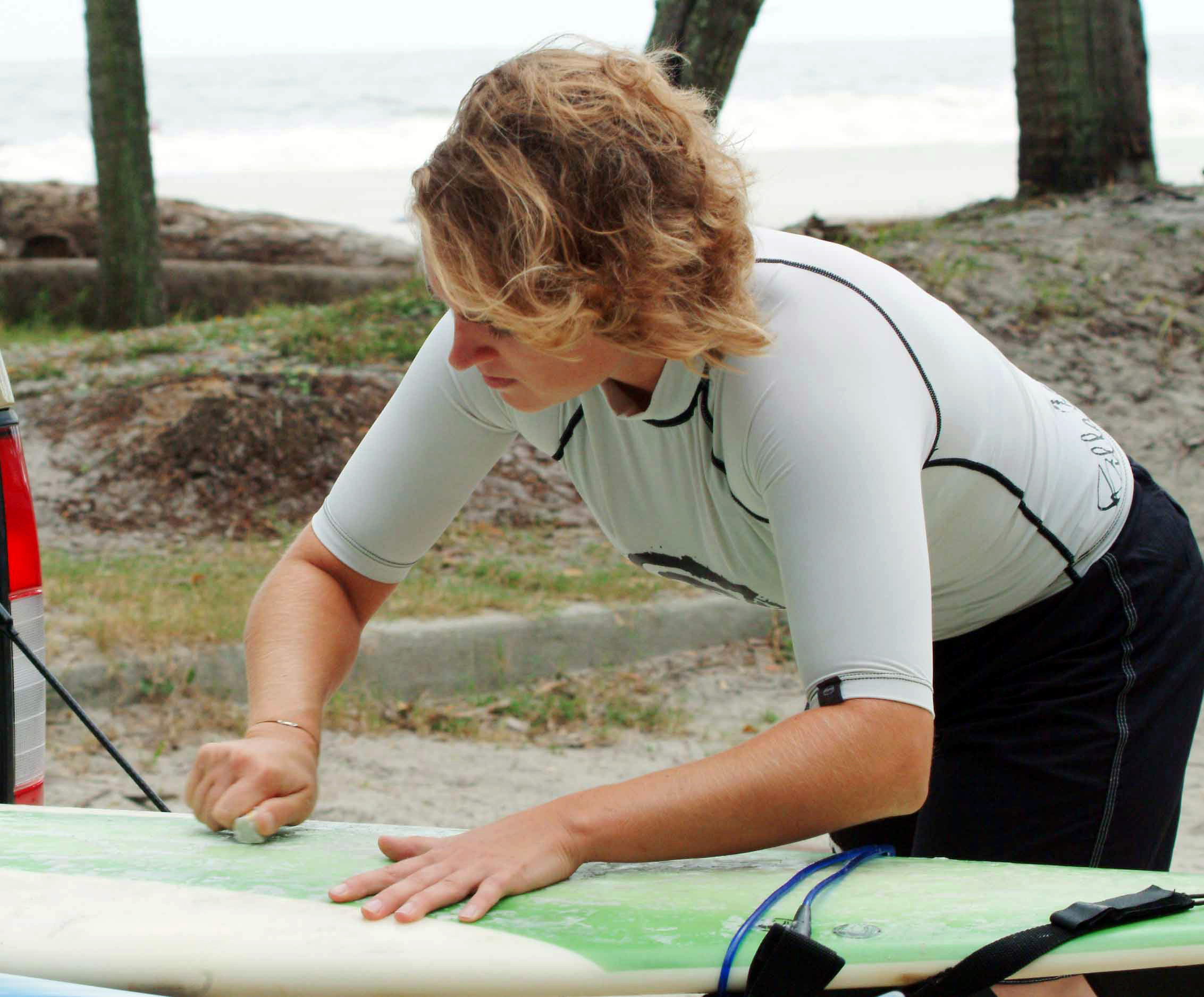
A woman applying wax on a surfboard in South Carolina

Surfboard wax (also known as surfwax) is a formulation of natural and/or synthetic wax for application to the deck of a surfboard, bodyboard, or skimboard, to keep the surfer from slipping off the board when paddling out or riding a wave. It is also used to increase grip on the paddle of a surf kayak or dragon boat.

Surfboard wax is generally composed of a mixture of paraffin, beeswax or other hard waxes; petroleum jelly can also be added to create a softer wax. Often scents like coconut or bubblegum are added. There are natural alternatives which contain only organic substances like beeswax, vegetable oils (such as coconut or hemp oil), pine resin, tree pulp and natural essential oils. There are surfboard wax formulations designed for various climates and water temperatures.

== Removal ==
A plastic scraper (typically found on the back of a wax comb) can be used to remove surfboard wax in large chunks. Residual wax that has not been removed by scraping can be removed with a soft cloth, either on its own or in combination with (for example) coconut oil. Various commercial solvents are also available but can damage the surfboard or its detailing. Surfers will also sometimes intentionally allow surfboard wax to melt in the sun, making the wax easier to remove.

== Wax comb ==
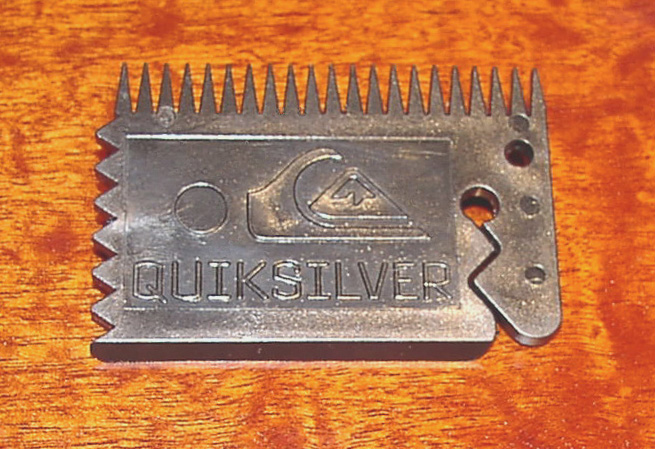

A wax comb is a tool used in the maintenance and removal of surfboard wax on a surfboard. Wax combs typically have features such a jagged or toothed edge and a straight, relatively sharp edge. The jagged edge is used to create textured grooves for improving the traction of the wax and the straight edge is used for scraping off unwanted wax. In addition to the straight edge for wax removal, some wax combs even have an inwardly curved edge for the rails (such as Mr. Zog's Sex Wax “Sex Comb”). Additionally, wax combs can have features such as fin key, bottle opener or a snap for portability (attachment to interior pocket loop, lanyard or leash attachment lanyard).

== Temperature ==
Most surfboard wax comes labeled with a water temperature range for which it is ideal. Wax used in water colder than its rating will become hard and not provide the stickiness needed to stay on the board, while wax used in water warmer than its rating may melt. This makes application of the correct type of wax important.

== Application ==
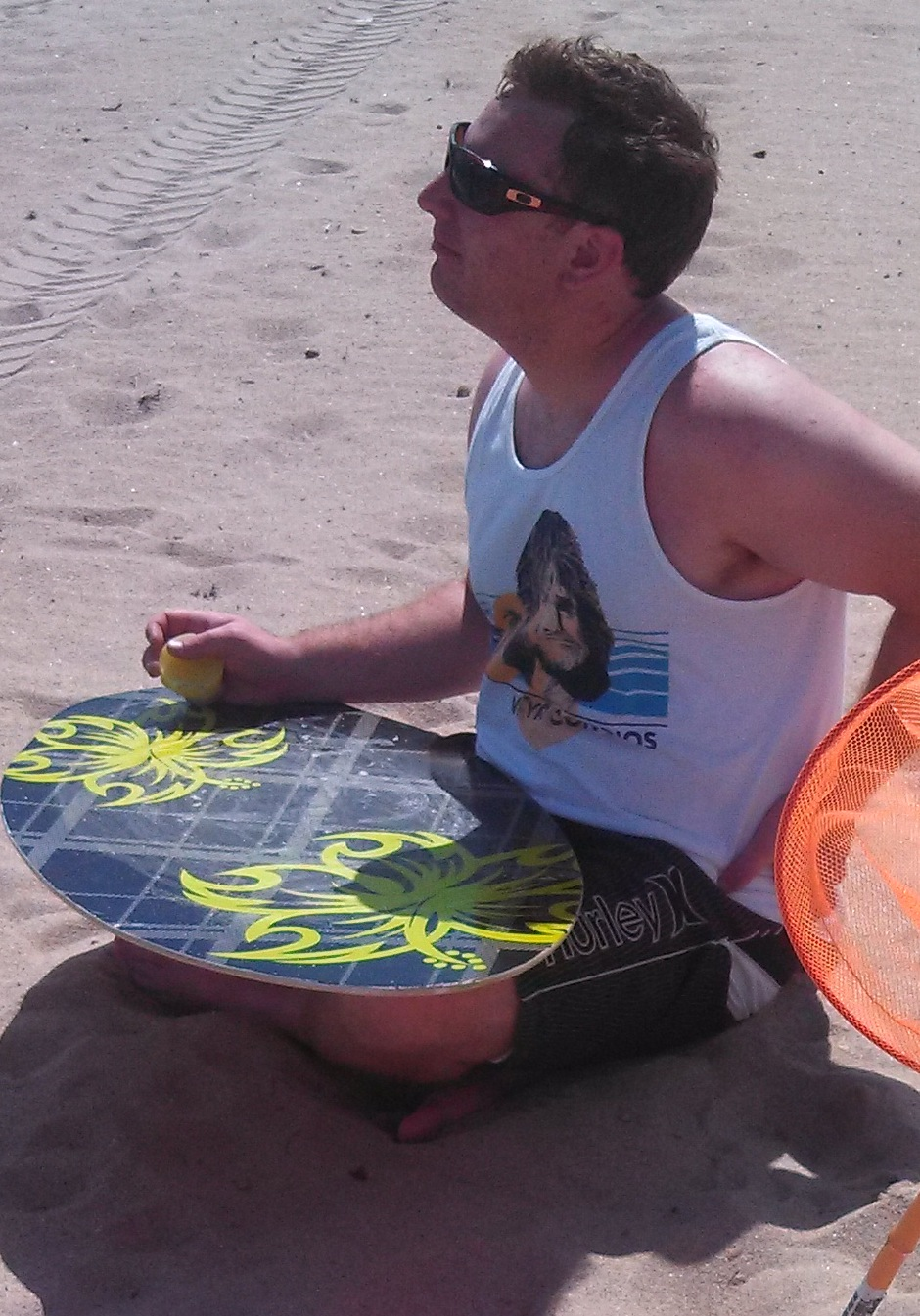
Man applies surfboard wax to skimboard at a beach.

Surfboard wax is applied by first putting a base coat onto the clean board. This harder base coat forms a bump pattern on the surfboard to which the surfer will stick. The base coat is then topped with a coat of wax of an appropriate temperature.

When re-applying surfboard wax, it is always crucial to remove all prior layers of wax.

== See also ==
- Ski wax
- Mr. Zog's Sex Wax
- Surf Wax America
