= Tanya Aguiñiga =

Mexican-American artist

- Born: 1978 (age 47–48); San Diego, California
- Known for: craft, design, furniture, textile arts, sculpture, site-specific art
- Awards: United States Artists Target Fellow in the field of Crafts and Traditional Arts; National Association of Latino Arts and Cultures and Creative Capital Grant Awardee; 2018 Johnson Fellowship for Artists Transforming Communities

Tanya Aguiñiga (born 1978, in San Diego, California) is a Los Angeles–based artist, designer, and activist.

== Early life and education ==
Although she was born in the United States, Aguiñiga spent her childhood living in Tijuana, Mexico. From ages 4 to 18, she travelled several hours daily across the border to attend school in San Diego, an experience that would influence her later life and work. She went on to receive a BA in Applied Design from San Diego State University and an MFA in furniture design from Rhode Island Institute of Design.

== Art and design career ==
Metabolizing the Border (2018-2020) by Tanya Aguiñiga at the Renwick Gallery in Washington, DC in 2022

Aguiñiga began designing furniture in 1997 while she was still an undergraduate student. Her first design job was working as a designer and fabricator off-camera for the DIY Network show called Freeform Furniture. Throughout her career, Aguiñiga's work has taken many forms but remains generally textile-centric, often combining modern design with elements of traditional craft technique and activism. Using a range of natural materials from beeswax to wool to human hair, Aguiñiga crafts furniture, textiles, wearable pieces, sculptures, and site-specific installations. In addition to designing furniture, jewelry, and other small scale pieces, she has extended her design mediums to fiber and creates weavings with materials such as woven jute, wool, silk, and cotton. She manages a team of nearly all female assistants in the creation of large format wall, woven hangings, by commission.

Aguiñiga's work has been featured in the PBS series Craft in America and in a 2011 site-specific exhibition at the Craft and Folk Art Museum, among many other venues. Fashion designer Ulla Johnson, commissioned a piece by Aguiñiga for her shop in New York.

From July 23 through September 17, 2016, Aguiñiga's "Teetering of the Marginal" accompanied pieces by Lenore Tawney and Loie Hollowell in a gallery exhibit titled 3 Women. The 1977 film 3 Women, written and directed by Robert Altman and starring Shelley Duvall, Sissy Spacek, and Janice Rule, provided inspiration to The Landing to gather the artists for the exhibit.

In May through October 2018 Aguiñiga had a solo exhibition of her work at the Museum of Arts and Design in New York City titled "Tanya Aguiñiga: Craft and Care". The show prominently featured her project AMBOS ("Art Made Between Opposite Sides"), that addresses life on the Mexican-American border. In Spanish "ambos" means both and according to the project's website the mission of AMBOS is to "express and document border emotion through art made on opposite sides by providing a platform to bi-national artists along the border." Her work was also featured in Disrupting Craft: Renwick Invitational 2018 at the Smithsonian American Art Museum's Renwick Gallery.

In 2021, Aguiñiga received the 26th Annual Heinz Award for the Arts.

In early 2022, Aguiñiga lead a social justice focused BIPOC Exchange at the newly reopened Frieze Los Angeles.

Aguiñiga, along with fourteen other artists of Latin American and Caribbean descent, was named Latinx Artists Fellows in 2022. The fellowship provides $50,000 and was funded by the Ford Foundation and the Mellon Foundation and the result of a collaboration of the US Latinx Art Forum and the New York Foundation of the Arts.

Aguiñiga's work was also featured in the Armory Show in 2022 as it moved to the Javits Center.

Her work, Metabolizing the Border, was acquired by the Smithsonian American Art Museum as part of the Renwick Gallery's 50th Anniversary Campaign.

In early 2023, Aguiñiga was commissioned by High Museum of Art to create “a monumental celebratory canopy … as its eighth site-specific installation the Woodruff Arts Center’s Carroll Slater Sifly Piazza.” The work was titled HAPPY JOYLANTA and was on display May 14 through November 26, 2023.

== Activism ==
Aguiñiga is responsible for multiple "performance crafting" happenings, including tying herself to the Beverly Hills sign and weaving while wearing traditional Mexican garments.

Having grown up on the U.S./Mexico border, Aguiñiga uses her life experiences in connection with her craft practice to promote collective creation within communities, spearheading art-based advocacy projects including the Border Art Workshop/Taler de Arte Fronterizo in Maclovio Rojas, Mexico, and AMBOS (Art Made Between Opposite Sides), spanning the US-Mexico border, which seeks to document the emotions of commuters crossing it and gives voice to bi-national artists.

== Collections ==
- Museum of Fine Arts, Houston
- Los Angeles County Museum of Art
