= Ethlie Ann Vare =

American screenwriter

Ethlie Ann Vare (born March 8, 1953) is an American journalist and screenwriter best known for her work on television shows including CSI: Crime Scene Investigation, Gene Roddenberry's Andromeda and Silk Stalkings, along with books including Mothers of Invention: Forgotten Women and Their Unforgettable Ideas, and Love Addict: Sex, Romance, and Other Dangerous Drugs. Vare has been listed in the International Who’s Who of Women for more than two decades. She has been a distinguished visiting lecturer at schools such as George Mason University, Brigham Young University and West Point. She has won a Maggie Award for her magazine work, an American Library Award and a Public Library Award for her non-fiction book, and a Prism Commendation for one of her television scripts.

== Early life ==
Ethlie Ann Herman was born in Montreal, Quebec, Canada and grew up in Greenwich Village in New York City. She attended the Bronx High School of Science where she was a National Merit Scholar, then moved to England and attended Bedales School, leaving at age 16. She attended the College of Creative Studies at the University of California, Santa Barbara, graduating with a bachelor's degree in world literature at 19. She was convicted of possession of drugs with intent to sell and was sent to California Institute for Women in Frontera, California.

== Rock music journalism ==
After completing her prison sentence, she met and married the British rock drummer Barry Charles Vare and had a son, Russell Alexander Vare. The family moved to Nevada City, California, where she got a job at the local newspaper, The Mountain Messenger, in 1978. Her weekly pop music column, "Rock On" was soon picked up for national syndication and led to higher profile writing work, including concert reviews for Billboard magazine. Work led her to Los Angeles, California, in 1983, where she became the editor of ROCK magazine, a reviewer for The Hollywood Reporter and Daily Variety, and a contributor to Elle, The New York Times and The Wall Street Journal among others. She also had her own "daily dose of rock & roll dish" on E!'s The Gossip Show.

== Television writing ==
Her first teleplay was a music-themed freelance episode of the action-adventure series, Renegade. She soon became a staff writer for Renegade, Silk Stalkings, Players and Earth: Final Conflict, then Gene Roddenberry’s Andromeda, Adventure Inc. and The Hallmark Mysteries: Jane Doe. Her made-for-television movie, Something Beneath, won a Platinum Remy Award and an episode of CSI:Crime Scene Investigation about women in prison ("XX") which was proposed for an Emmy Award nomination in 2004.

== Non-fiction books ==
Vare's first book was published under a pseudonym when she was 17 years old. "It was a virgin's idea of what pornography sounds like," she later remarked. Her first legitimate release was the pop-star biography Everything You Wanted to Know About. . . Stevie Nicks, co-written with reporter Ed Ochs when Vare was a talent correspondent at Billboard. Now a collector's item, the paperback sells at online auctions for $200 or more. In 1986, Vare wrote another musical biography: Ozzy Osbourne, for the Ballantine Books series Monsters of Metal.

Inspired by a ROCK magazine article about the Monkees band member Michael Nesmith's mother, Bette Nesmith Graham, who invented Liquid Paper, ROCK editors Vare and Greg Ptacek co-wrote the "pop history" Mothers of Invention: Forgotten Women and their Unforgettable Ideas in 1988, followed in 1993 by Women Inventors and Their Discoveries, aimed at a middle-school readership. Vare later wrote a book for grade-school readers, Adventurous Spirit: A Story about Ellen Swallow Richards, about America's first female professional chemist. In 2001, Vare and Ptacek reunited for the sequel Patently Female.

Vare has written or edited biographies of pop culture figures including Frank Sinatra, Tom Cruise, Judy Garland and Barbra Streisand. Her only novel is The Broken Places (published in 2004), co-written with Daniel Morris and set in the universe of Gene Roddenberry's Andromeda.

Vare's 2011 release is also her most autobiographical, Love Addict: Sex, Romance and Other Dangerous Drugs (HCI Books, 2011), which developed out of her blog Affection Deficit Disorder. Love Addict is her eleventh published book, the first on the subject of addiction, something she has experienced firsthand. "It is," she says, "a funny book about a serious subject."

== Children's Book ==
In 2022 Ethlie Ann Vare became an early adopter of generative AI technology and used it to illustrate a children's book with paintings in the style of her late father, portrait artist Ben Herman. "Technology brought my dead dad and my dead dog together on the page" she said. WOOF! (Central Park South Publishing March 2023), is the story of a tomboy who rescues a “death row doggie” who is actually a wolf, mistaken for a dog. Or maybe he’s a dog who just thinks he’s a wolf. In the end, the two misfit lone wolves... fit.

== Works ==
Non-fiction:

- (with Ed Ochs) Stevie Nicks (also known as Everything You Want to Know about Stevie Nicks), Ballantine, 1985.
- (as Lee Riley) Tom Cruise, Pinnacle, 1985.
- Ozzy Osbourne, Ballantine, 1986.
- (with Mary Toledo) Harrison Ford, St. Martin's Press, 1988.
- (with Greg Ptacek) Mothers of Invention: From the Bra to the Bomb; Forgotten Women and Their Unforgettable Ideas, Morrow, 1988.
- (as Lee Riley) Patrick Duffy, St. Martin's Press, 1988.
- (as Lee Riley) The Sheens, St. Martin's Press, 1989.
- Adventurous Spirit: A Story about Ellen Swallow Richards, illustrated by Jennifer Hagerman, CarolRhoda Books, 1992.
- (with Ptacek) Women Inventors and Their Discoveries, Oliver Press, 1993.
- Legend: Frank Sinatra and the American Dream, Boulevard, 1995.
- (editor) Diva: Barbra Streisand and the Making of a Superstar, Berkley Publishing, 1996.
- (editor with Michael Musto) Rainbow: A Star-Studded Tribute to Judy Garland, Berkley Publishing, 1998.
- (with Ptacek) Patently Female: From AZT to TV Dinners, Stories of Women Inventors and Their Breakthrough Ideas, John Wiley & Sons, 2001; some sources cite the title as Patently Female: More Women Inventors and Discoveries.

Children's Book:

- (illustrated by Robots) Woof! Central Park South Publishing, March 14, 2023.

Television

- "When She Was Bad", Silk Stalkings, USA Network, 1996.
- Renegade, USA Network and syndicated, multiple episodes, 1996-97.
- "The Babysitter", Silk Stalkings, USA Network, 1997.
- "I Love the Nightlife," Silk Stalkings, USA Network, 1997.
- "In Concert," Players, NBC, 1997.
- "Rashocon," Players, NBC, 1997.
- "The Cloister", Earth: Final Conflict (also known as EFC, Gene Roddenberry's Battleground Earth, Gene Roddenberry's Earth: Final Conflict), syndicated, 1999.
- "Deja Vu" Earth: Final Conflict, syndicated, 1999
- (author of story) "Ransom of Red Val", V.I.P., syndicated, 1999.
- "The Golden Phoenix", BeastMaster, syndicated, 2000.
- "Subterfuge", Earth: Final Conflict, syndicated, 2000.
- Andromeda (also known as Gene Roddenberry's Andromeda), syndicated, multiple episodes, 2000-2002.
- "Bride of the Sun", Adventure Inc., syndicated, 2002.
- "Village of the Lost", Adventure Inc., syndicated, 2002.
- "Maternal Mirrors", Strong Medicine, Lifetime, 2003.
- "The Search for Arthur", Adventure Inc., syndicated, 2003.
- "XX", CSI: Crime Scene Investigation, CBS, 2004.

Movies:

- Jane Doe: The Wrong Face, The Hallmark Channel, 2005.
- Jane Doe: The Harder They Fall, The Hallmark Channel, 2006.
- Jane Doe: Yes, I Remember It Well, The Hallmark Channel, 2006.
- Black Swarm (also known as Night of the Drones), Sci-Fi Channel, 2007.
- Jane Doe: Ties That Bind, The Hallmark Channel, 2007.
- Something Beneath, Sci-Fi Channel, 2007.
- Jane Doe: How to Fire Your Boss, The Hallmark Channel, c. 2007.
- Swamp Devil, Super Channel (Canada) and Sci-Fi Channel, 2008.

Novels:

- (with Daniel Morris) The Broken Places (novel related to the television series Andromeda), St. Martin's Press, c. 2004.
