= Summer Undergraduate Research Fellowship =

Within higher-education, Summer Undergraduate Research Fellowships (SURF) are a common summer immersion experience which supplement research activities that occur during the academic year. Typically, these highly competitive undergraduate programs are overseen by a member of a college's faculty, who provide general guidance to the undergraduate's research work. Areas of research vary widely, and can come from any art or science discipline.

Often, SURF participants are given a stipend to cover living expenses for the duration of the project. SURF projects are also, more often than not, used for college credit, though this will vary according to the institution.

Many colleges give students the option to carry out a one or two semester senior research project, also under the SURF banner. Majors in a department follow a core of course requirements intended to gradually introduce students to the research process. By following this core, undergraduates reach their senior year adequately prepared for meaningful, independent research. A distinctive element of many SURF experiences is that the project results in a written thesis defended before a faculty panel in the presence of the department and students.
