= AMBOS =

Artist collective in Los Angeles, California

- Art Made Between Opposite Sides
- Formation: 2016; 10 years ago
- Founder: Tanya Aguiñiga
- Headquarters: Los Angeles, California, U.S.
- Formerly called: AMBOS Project

AMBOS, or "Art Made Between Opposite Sides", is a bi-national artist collective and art project based in Los Angeles, California, US. It was founded in 2016 by artist Tanya Aguiñiga.
