= Lethaia =

- Discipline: Paleontology, stratigraphy
- Language: English
- Edited by: Peter Doyle

Publication details
- History: 1968–present
- Publisher: Scandinavian University Press
- Frequency: Quarterly
- Impact factor: 1.454 (2014)

Standard abbreviations
- ISO 4: Lethaia

Indexing
- CODEN: LETHAT
- ISSN: 0024-1164
- LCCN: 72456902
- OCLC no.: 02277593

Links
- Journal homepage

Lethaia is a quarterly peer-reviewed scientific journal of Earth science, covering research on palaeontology and stratigraphy. Now published by Scandinavian University Press, it was originally published by the International Commission on Stratigraphy. It is an official publication of the International Palaeontological Association and the International Commission on Stratigraphy. The journal had a 2012 impact factor of 2.488, ranking it 7th out of 48 journals in the category "Paleontology", though its IF has since declined.
