= Carol Bennett =

American painter

- Born: 1954 (age 71–72); Los Angeles, California, U.S.
- Education: College of Creative Studies (BA); ArtCenter College of Design (BA)
- Occupations: Painter; glass artist

Carol Bennett (born 1954) is an American painter and glass artist based in Hawaii.

== Early life ==
Bennett was born in Los Angeles, California. She received a Bachelor of Arts (B.A) from the University of California, Santa Barbara, College of Creative Studies in 1974 and another B.A. from the Art Center College of Design in 1978. Since 1990, she has lived in Kauai.

== Public art ==
Her artworks in public places include:

- Rise, Fall and Drink, three 5 ft x 8 ft, oil and enamel on glass paintings, Hawaii Convention Center, 2001
- Ocean Patterns, 180-foot-long mural, oil on birch ply, Daniel K. Inouye International Airport, 2002
- Kanawai, two Italian glass mosaic tile murals, each 11 x 22 feet, Kauai Judiciary Building, 2005
- Water: A Point of Departure, two acrylic on Dacron sail cloth, 8 x 26 ft. and 8 x 52 ft, Foyer and Passenger Queuing at Pier 2 Terminal, Honolulu Harbor, 2008-2009
- Trigger Picasso Energy, 48 x 8 foot hand-painted colored vitreous enamels fired on float glass with gold leaf and photovoltaic solar cells, Hawaii State Art Museum, 2012
- Cycles, fused glass and light-emitting diodes, on exterior of the James and Abigail Campbell Library, University of Hawaiʻi at West Oʻahu, 2012

== Collections ==
The Hawaii State Art Museum and the Honolulu Museum of Art are among the museums holding works by Bennett.

== Themes ==
Jewel by Carol Bennett

Bennett's paintings are generally related to water; swimmers and fishing nets are recurring subjects. They often contain totally abstract passages representing reflections, as in Jewel.
