= Bradley Ertaskiran =

Art gallery in Montreal, Canada

Coordinates: 45.4828°N 73.5842°W

Bradley Ertaskiran is a contemporary art gallery based in Montreal, Canada, established in 2020.

== History ==
Bradley Ertaskiran was established in January 2020 in Montreal, Canada, as the result of a merger between two Montreal-based gallerists: Megan Bradley, director of Parisian Laundry, and Antoine Ertaskiran, founder and director of Galerie Antoine Ertaskiran. The gallery has participated in some international art fairs.
