= Marvin Mudrick =

American academic (1921-1986)

- Born: 1921; Philadelphia, Pennsylvania, U.S.
- Died: 1986 (aged 64–65)
- Education: AB Temple University (1942); University of California at Berkeley Ph. D in English
- Occupations: American Literary Critic; Essayist; University Provost

Marvin Mudrick (1921–1986) taught at UC Santa Barbara from 1949 until his death in October 1986. He created the university's College of Creative Studies in 1967 and was its provost until forced out by Chancellor Robert Huttenback in 1984. He wrote 100 essays on books for The Hudson Review and published five collections of his essays on books and writers. He also wrote for The New York Review of Books and Harper's.

As a teacher at UCSB, he ranked as an instructor from 1949 to 1951, an assistant professor from 1951 to 1957, an associate professor from 1957 to 1963, a full professor from 1963 to 1986, and the provost of the College of Creative Studies from 1967 to 1984.

He won the O. Henry Prize in 1967 for "Cleopatra," published in the Hudson Review.

== Selected works ==
- Books Are Not Life but then What Is? (Oxford University Press, 1979)
- Nobody Here But Us Chickens (Ticknor & Fields, 1981) [Containing perhaps his most notorious essay, the title essay on Shakespeare]
- The Man in the Machine (Horizon Press, 1977)
- On Culture and Literature (Horizon Press, 1970)
- Jane Austen: Irony as Defense and Discovery (University of California Press, 1974)
- Joseph Conrad: Twentieth Century Views: A Collection of Critical Essays (Edited by Mudrick)
- Mudrick Transcribed: Classes and Talks by Lance Kaplan (College of Creative Studies, 1989)
