= Oguri =

Oguri (Naoyuki Oguri)
- Born: 1963 (age 61–62); Tajimi in the Gifu Prefecture of Japan
- Education: Student of Tatsumi Hijikata and Body Weather of Min Tanaka.
- Occupations: Choreographer and dancer
- Known for: Feature in "Height of Sky" a documentary by Morleigh Steinberg
- Notable work: Kalpa which was performed at the Getty Center in Los Angeles.; Cold Dream Colour at the Walt Disney Concert Hall complex.
- Spouse: Roxanne Steinberg

Naoyuki Oguri (born c.1963), who performs as simply Oguri, is a dancer and choreographer from Japan who lives in Los Angeles, California, where he works creating and teaching dance. His work is influenced by the tradition of the Japanese Butoh style of dance.

Oguri was born in Tajimi in the Gifu Prefecture of Japan. Prior to coming to Los Angeles he studied with master Tatsumi Hijikata, the founder of a genre of Butoh dance whom Oguri credits as his inspiration for interest in the field. He also studied and danced with Min Tanaka's Body Weather in a mountain village in Yamanashi Prefecture in rural Japan where he met dancer and choreographer Roxanne Steinberg. In 1990, he had traveled to Los Angeles and married Steinberg. In 2002, he was featured in Meiling Cheng's book In Other Los Angeleses. Oguri was also featured in the film Height of Sky a documentary by Morleigh Steinberg.

Subsequent works include Kalpa, performed at the Getty Center in Los Angeles in January 2012 as well as a performance of Cold Dream Colour as a member of the Arcane Collective at the REDCAT, part of the Walt Disney Concert Hall complex.
