= Works & Process =

Performing arts series in New York City

Works & Process at the Guggenheim is a performing-arts series at the Solomon R. Guggenheim Museum in New York City. Works & Process informs artistic creation through conversation and performance, and is presented in the Guggenheim’s Frank Lloyd Wright–designed Peter B. Lewis Theater.

After over 300 productions, Works & Process is now recognized as a pioneer in creating programs that provide access to leading performing artists, writers, choreographers, composers, scientists, and directors. Programs continue to offer both discussion and performance. Programs are often sold out, and following each event, a reception with the artists takes place in the museum's rotunda.

From the museum's inception, Frank Lloyd Wright recognized the importance of making performance an integral part of the museum's dedication to the performing arts. Mary Sharp Cronson, Works & Process founder, offered to create a series when the museum was no longer able to do so. Mrs. Cronson would go on to invite leaders in the worlds of art and science to talk about their work and to showcase their creative process.

Described by the New York Times as "a popular series devoted to shedding light on the creative process", by the Village Voice as "revelatory", by the New Yorker as "exceptional", and by New York magazine as "illuminating".

Noteworthy programs include a preview of the Broadway musical Fun Home in spring 2015, Shuffle Along (with director George C. Wolfe and performer Brian Stokes Mitchell) in spring 2016, surveys of the seasons of the American Ballet Theatre, NYCB, New York City Opera, and Metropolitan Opera, and conversations and performances with artists such as Philip Glass.

The series annually produces a holiday season production of Sergei Prokofiev's Peter and the Wolf, narrated by Isaac Mizrahi, and featuring different visual elements (sometimes choreography or costuming, and in 2011 giant balloon sculptures by Jason Hackenwerth) for children and families.

In 2016, the Museum announced a new series of Rotunda Projects, commissions of new work created specifically for the Museum's iconic rotunda space. The first set of commissions will be performed in spring and fall 2017, created by MacArthur Genius Grant recipient choreographer Michelle Dorrance and American Ballet Theatre principal dancer Daniil Simkin respectively.
