= Hank Pitcher =

American artist (born 1949)

- Born: 1949 (age 76–77); Pasadena, California, U.S.
- Education: University of California, Santa Barbara
- Occupations: artist, professor
- Website: hankpitchereditions.com

Hank Pitcher (born 1949) is an American contemporary artist. Pitcher is known for his paintings of coastal landscapes and California culture. Pitcher has surfed and painted the Santa Barbara coastline for over a half a century.

Pitcher he has been a senior lecturer in the College of Creative Studies at University of California, Santa Barbara since 1971.

His work is included in the collections of the Santa Barbara Museum of Art, the Syracuse Museum of Art at Syracuse University, New York and the Museum of Fine Arts Houston.
