= Loie Hollowell =

American painter

Loie Hollowell (born 1983) is an American painter. She was born and raised in Northern California. She currently lives and works in New York City.

Hollowell creates abstract biomorphic paintings that suggest spirituality and sexuality. Hollowell's work is inspired by tantric painting traditions, and she has been compared to the artist Georgia O'Keeffe.

== Education ==
Hollowell holds a BA from the University of California, Santa Barbara, and an MFA in Painting from Virginia Commonwealth University.

== Work ==
Boob Wheel (2019) at the Hirshhorn Museum and Sculpture Garden in 2022

Hollowell's paintings have been described as "abstract body landscapes" by Martha Schwendener of the New York Times. Known for paintings and drawings that explore the bodily landscape, Loie Hollowell's practice exists in the liminal space between abstraction and figuration, otherworldly and corporeal.

Originating in autobiography, her work explores themes of sexuality, pregnancy and birth. Hollowell's geometric compositions use symbolic shapes such as the mandorla, ogee and lingam to build her distinctive visual lexicon. In referencing her own personal experiences, Hollowell's paintings are at once personal and universal in their fierce vulnerability. Her use of symmetry - often anchoring her compositions in a central, singular axis - relates her paintings to her own body as well as the natural world.

For Hollowell, the scale of her work is particularly significant as she creates each work in direct correlation with the size of the body part depicted, be it her head, breasts, groin, or entire body. Furthering her exploration of physicality, Hollowell adheres sculpted forms onto her canvases to confound expectations of painting. Hollowell’s protruding forms are blended seamlessly, forcing the viewer to move around the canvas to determine whether it is an illusory flat surface or three-dimensional. This adds a playful, performative aspect to her work that speaks to Hollowell’s masterful manipulation of space, surface, light and shadow.

With strong colors, varied textures, and geometric symmetry, Hollowell’s practice is situated in lineage with the work of American artists like Agnes Pelton, Georgia O’Keeffe and Judy Chicago. She is also greatly influenced by the work of the California Light and Space Movement as well as Neo-Tantric painters like Ghulam Rasool Santosh and Biren De.

== Solo exhibitions ==
- Loie Hollowell: Lost¸ National Gallery of Saskatchewan, Canora, Canada, December 20, 2008 – January 20, 2009.
- Loie Hollowell: I Repeat Myself, Gregory Kondos Gallery, Sacramento City College, October 1–31, 2008.
- Loie Hollowell: Middle Ground¸ Richmond International Airport, Virginia, November 1, 2011 – February 27, 2012.
- Loie Hollowell: Middle Ground¸ Richmond International Airport, Virginia, November 1, 2011 – February 27, 2012.
- Loie Hollowell: Mother Tongue, Feuer/Mesler, New York, October 27–December 18, 2016.
- Loie Hollowell: Point of Entry, Pace Palo Alto, California, September 20–November 2, 2017.
- Loie Hollowell: Dominant / Recessive, Pace Gallery, 6 Burlington Gardens, London, August 28–September 20, 2018.
- Loie Hollowell: Switchback, Pace Gallery, 15C Entertainment Building, 30 Queen's Road Central, Hong Kong, March 27–May 31, 2018.
- Loie Hollowell: Space Between, A Survey of Ten Years, The Aldrich Contemporary Art Museum, January 21 to August 11, 2024
