= List of University of California, Santa Barbara alumni =

This page lists notable alumni and students of the University of California, Santa Barbara. Notable faculty members are in the article List of University of California, Santa Barbara faculty.

== Awards, honors, and prize winners ==
=== Nobel laureates ===
UCSB Award winners

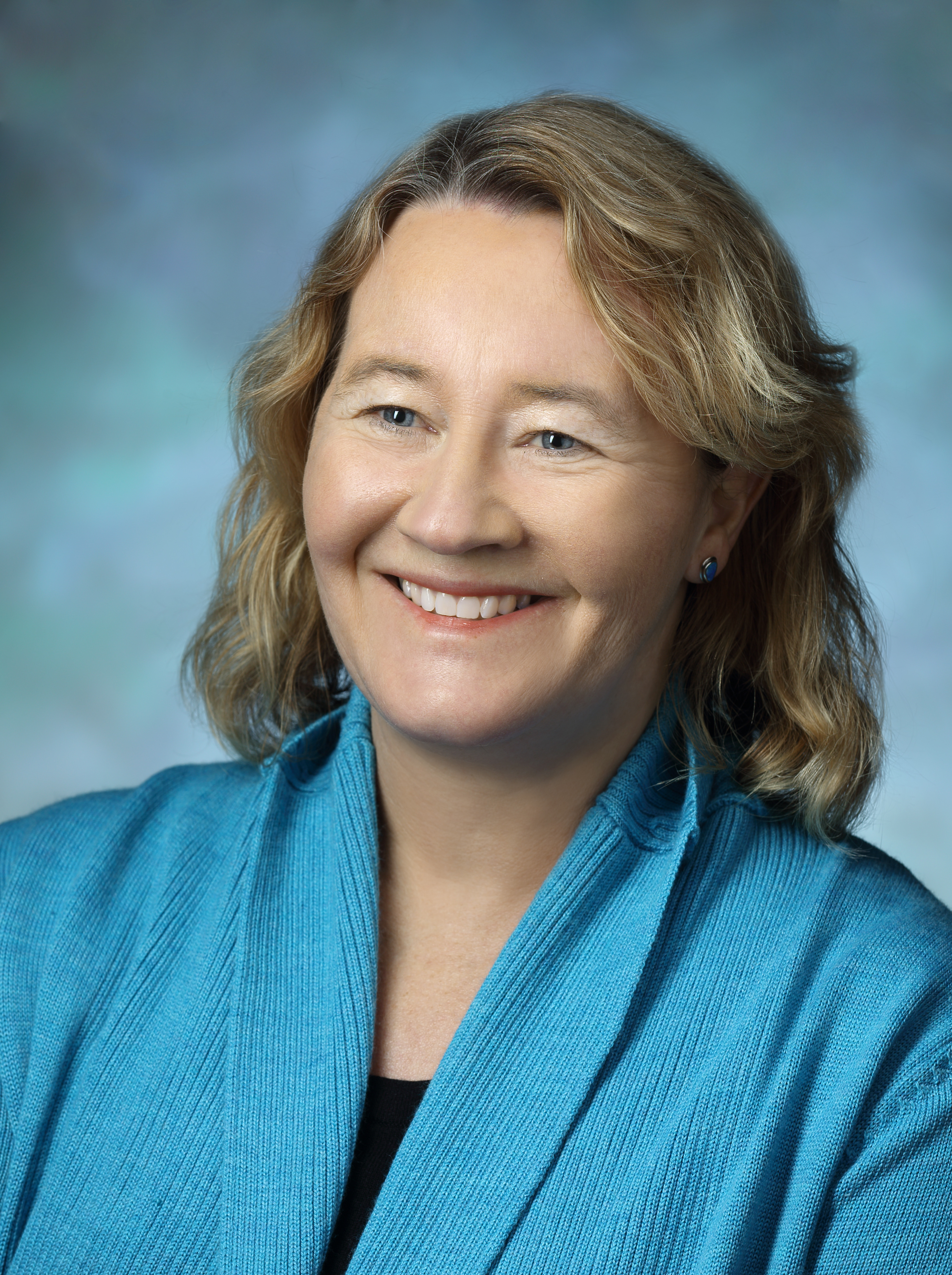
Carol Greider, B.A. 1983 – 2009 Nobel Prize winner

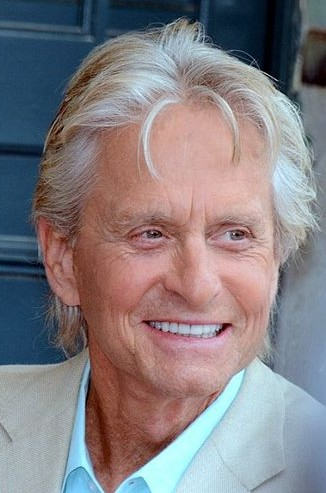
Michael Douglas, B.A. 1968 – two-time Academy Award winner

Name	Degree(s)	Prize year	Prize field	Reason (prize citation)	Additional notability
Carol W. Greider	B.A. 1983	2009	Physiology or Medicine	"For the discovery of how chromosomes are protected by telomeres and the enzyme telomerase."	molecular biologist/geneticist and distinguished professor at the University of California, Santa Cruz

=== Pulitzer Prize ===
Name	Degree(s)	Prize year	Prize field	Reason (prize citation)	Additional notability
David Moats	B.A. 1969	2001	Editorial Writing	"For his even-handed and influential series of editorials commenting on the divisive issues arising from civil unions for same-sex couples."	editor at Rutland Herald and Barre Montpelier Times Argus
Bob Sipchen	B.A. 1976	2002	Editorial Writing	"For their comprehensive and powerfully written editorials exploring the issues and dilemmas provoked by mentally ill people dwelling on the streets."	also a staff member at the Los Angeles Times which won the 1993 Pulitzer Prize for Spot News Reporting
Sanaz Toossi	2013	2023	Drama	"For a distinguished play by an American author, preferably original in its source and dealing with American life."	playwright and screenwriter

=== Academy Awards ===
Name	Degree(s)	Prize year	Prize field	Additional notability
Michael Douglas	B.A. 1968	1976, 1988	Best Picture, Best Actor	actor and producer who has also won six Golden Globe Awards, the Cecil B. DeMille Award, and the AFI Life Achievement Award
Gwyneth Paltrow	attended	1999	Best Actress	actress and businesswoman; won a Golden Globe Award
Eric Roth	1966	1995	Best Adapted Screenplay	screenwriter nominated for 6 Academy Award Best Adapted Screenplays (one win), the second-most in history
Andy Jurgensen	2004	2025	Best Film Editing	film editor for One Batter After Another (2025), Licorice Pizza (2021)

=== Emmy Awards ===
Name	Degree(s)	Prize year	Prize field	Additional notability
Dante Di Loreto	1984	2010, 2014	Outstanding Television Movie	film and television producer who has also won a Daytime Emmy Award and Tony Award
Jason Ross	1993	2003–2006, 2009, 2011, 2012	Outstanding Writing for a Variety Series	writer and author

=== MacArthur Fellows ===
The MacArthur Fellows Program is also known as the "MacArthur Fellowship" or "Genius Grant."

Name	Degree(s)	Prize year	Additional notability
Amir Abo-Shaeer	B.S. 1996, M.S. 1998, M.Ed. 2001	2010	high school physics teacher and mechanical engineer
Angela Belcher	B.S. 1991, Ph.D. 1997	2004	materials scientist professor at the Massachusetts Institute of Technology
Robin Fleming	B.A. 1977, Ph.D. 1984	2013	medieval historian and professor at Boston College
Victoria Orphan	B.A. 1994, Ph.D. 2002	2016	geobiologist and professor at the California Institute of Technology
Jon Seger	B.A. 1969	1987	evolutionary ecologist and professor at the University of Utah
Edith Widder	M.A. 1977, Ph.D. 1982	2006	oceanographer and marine biologist

== Academics ==
UCSB Academics

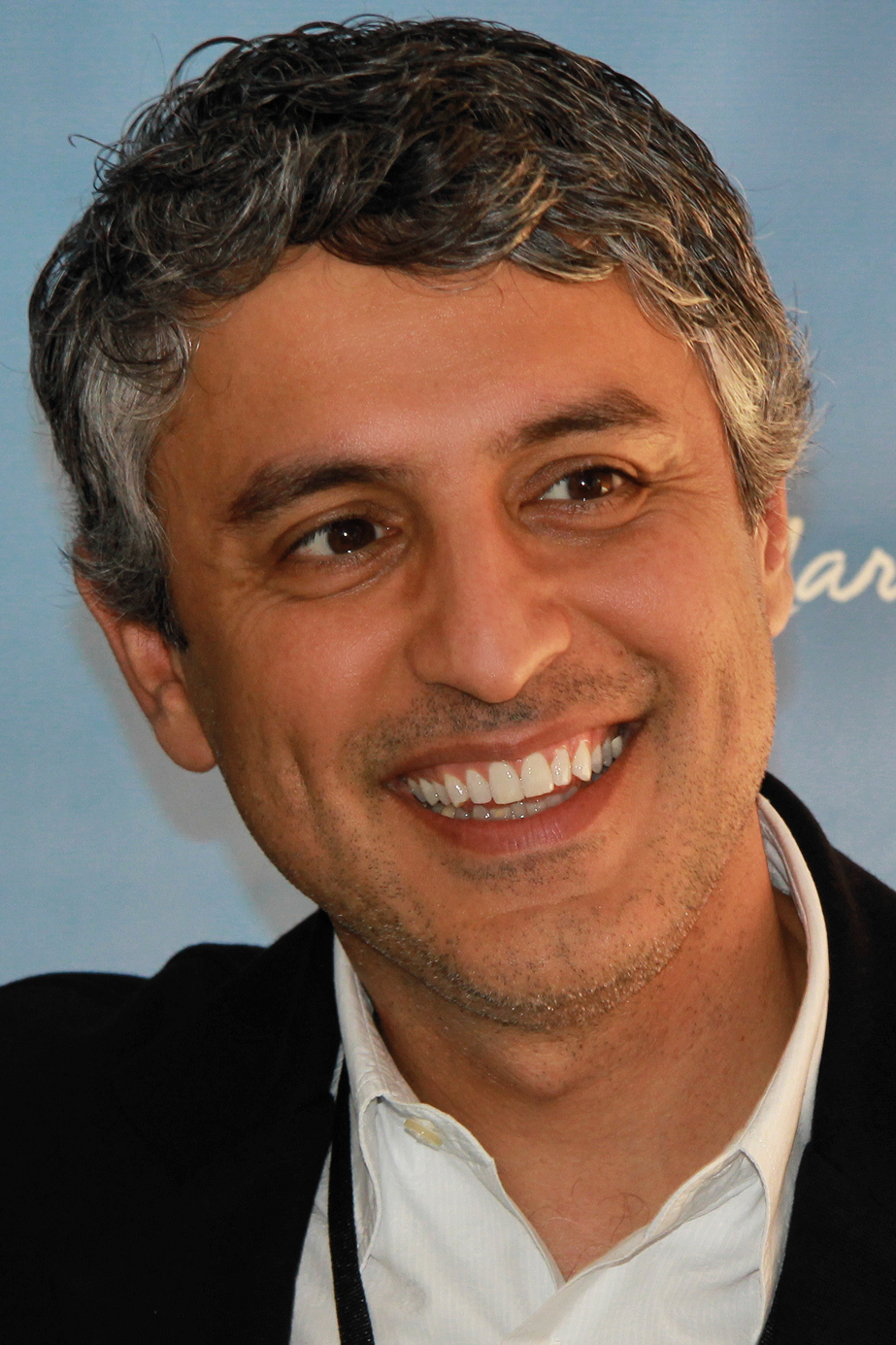
Reza Aslan, Ph.D 2009 – Iranian-American author, commentator and religious scholar

- R.J.Q. Adams, Ph.D. 1972 – American historian and Patricia & Bookman Peters Professor of History at Texas A&M University
- Reza Aslan, Ph.D. 2009 – Iranian-American author, commentator and religious scholar; professor of creative writing at University of California, Riverside
- Wendy Berry Mendes, Ph.D. 2003 – social psychologist and former Miss California
- Rory A. Cooper, Ph.D. 1989 – professor and founder of Human Engineering Research Laboratories
- Michael Dennin, M.A., Ph.D. 1995 – professor at the University of California, Irvine
- Denis Dutton, B.A. 1966, Ph.D. 1975 – professor, philosopher, and founder of Arts & Letters Daily
- Carol Folt, B.A. 1976, M.A. 1978 – president of the University of Southern California
- Nancy Guerra, M.A. 1977 – psychologist and dean of the School of Social Ecology at the University of California, Irvine
- James Kilgore, 1969 – former Symbionese Liberation Army and professor at University of Illinois, Urbana-Champaign
- Jakob Lothe, M.A. 1976 – literary scholar and professor at the University of Oslo
- Neda Maghbouleh, M.A. 2008, Ph.D. 2012 – American-born Canadian sociologist, scholar, writer, author, and educator; the Canada Research Chair in Migration, Race, and Identity and associate professor of Sociology at the University of Toronto Mississauga
- Heather McKillop, Ph.D. 1987 – Mayanist archaeologist and professor at Louisiana State University
- John D. Petersen, Ph.D. 1975 – former president of the University of Tennessee system
- Saba Soomekh, Ph.D. 2008 – religious author and visiting faculty at various universities
- Ronald Vale, B.A. 1980 – professor, University of California, San Francisco; Howard Hughes Medical Institute investigator; executive director, Janelia Research Campus; member of the National Academy of Sciences
- Hans J. Van Miegroet, Ph.D. 1988 – professor at Duke University
- Tim Vivian, Ph.D. 1985 – scholar of Early Christianity and Professor Emeritus of Religious Studies at California State University, Bakersfield
- Jon Whitmore, Ph.D. 1974 – CEO of ACT, Inc., former president of San Jose State University and Texas Tech University
- Brian C. Wilson, M.A. 1991, Ph.D 1996 – scholar of American religious history
- Jay Alan Yim, B.A. 1980 – composer and associate professor at Northwestern University

== Arts, entertainment, and literature ==
UCSB Arts, Entertainment, and Literature alumni

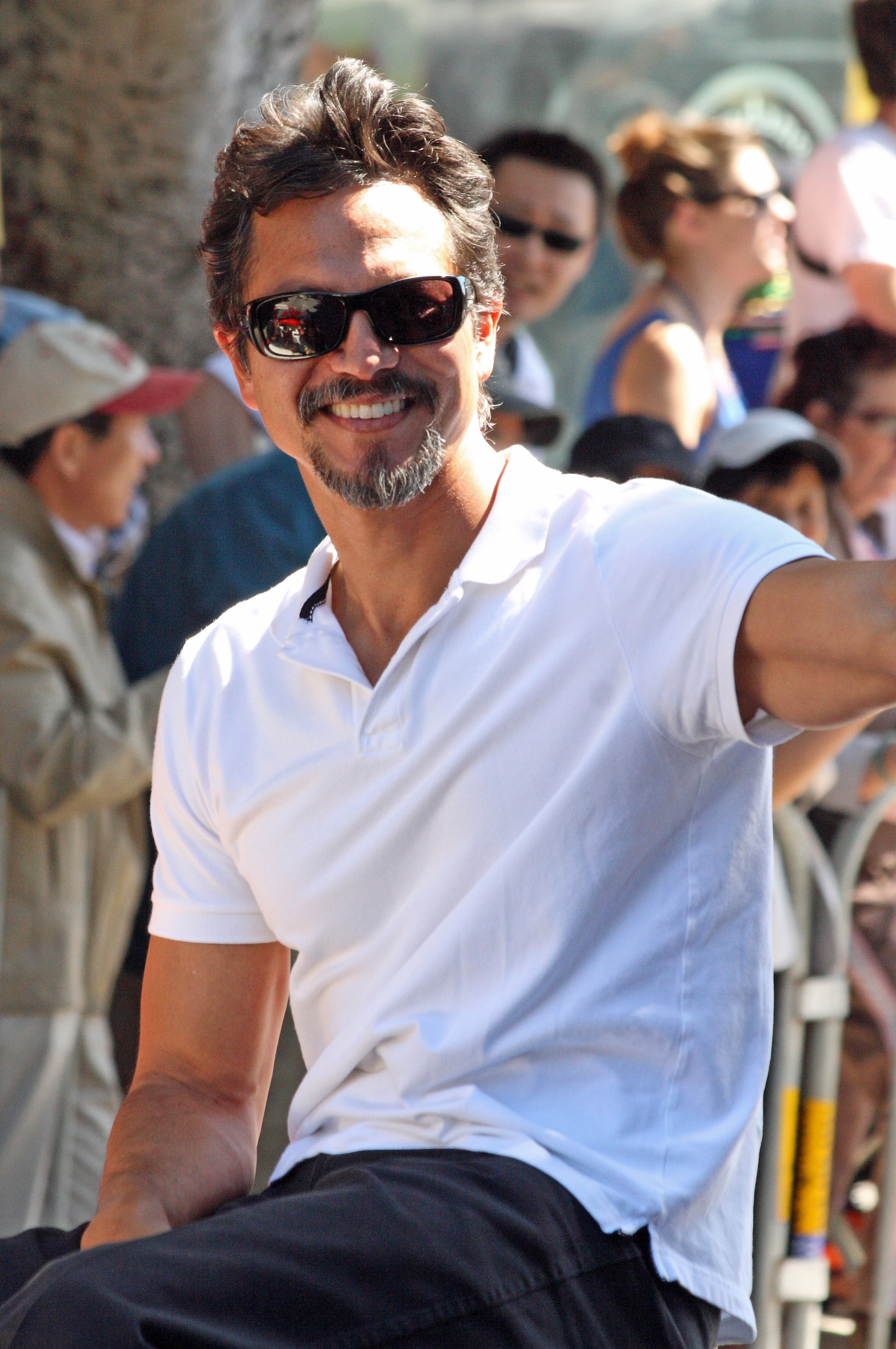
Benjamin Bratt, B.F.A. 1986 – actor

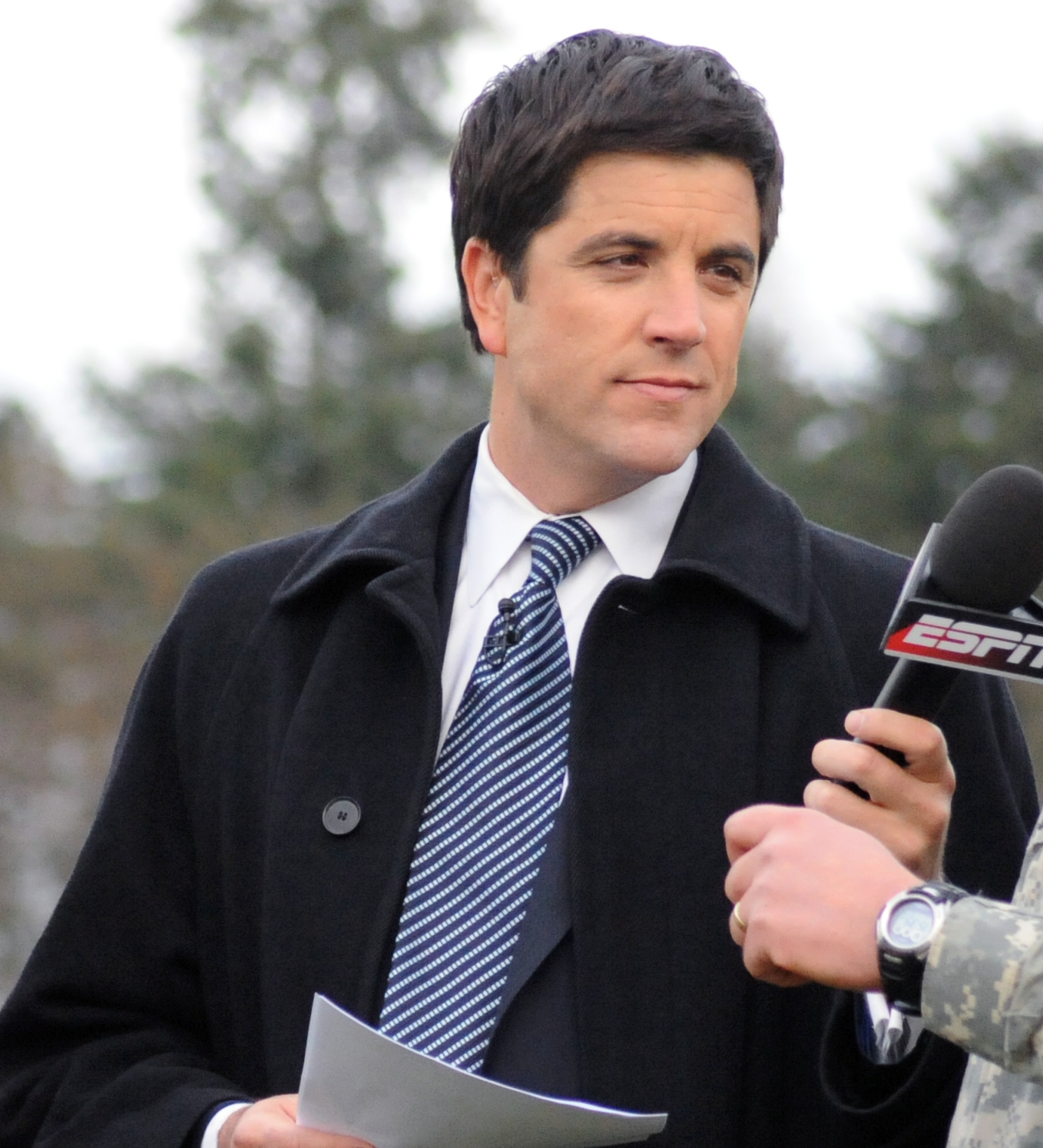
Josh Elliott, B.A. 1993 – television host

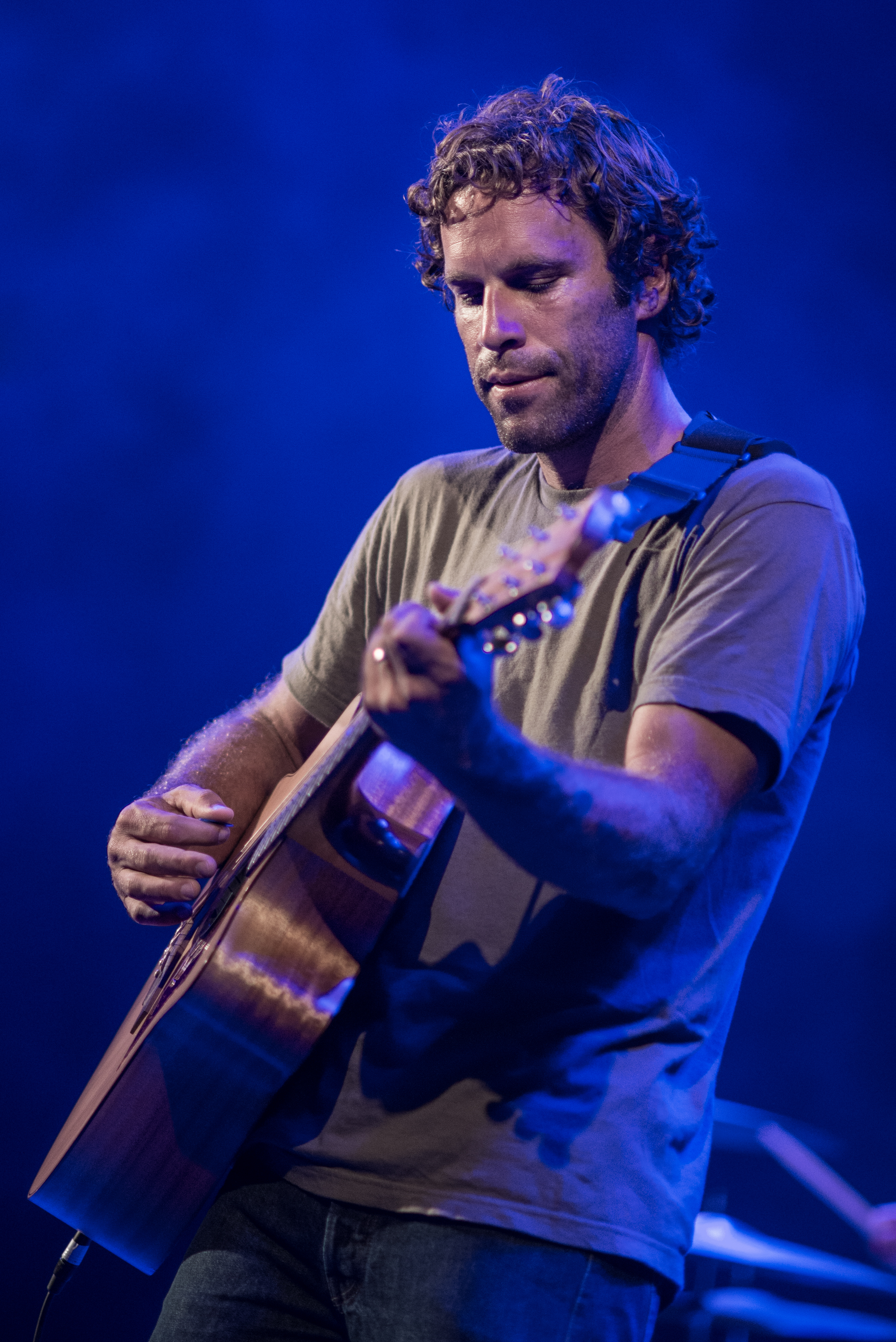
Jack Johnson, B.A. 1997 – musician

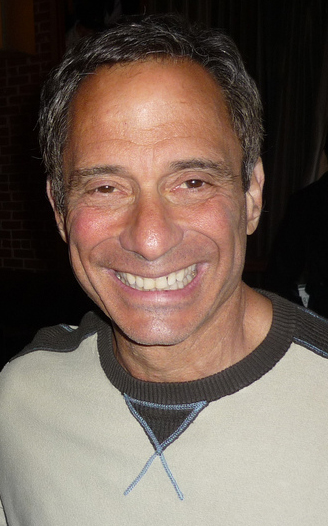
Harvey Levin, B.A. 1972 – founder of TMZ

- Marwan Abdelhamid, B.A. 2022 - Palestinian singer-songwriter and rapper
- Steve Aoki, B.A. 2000 – electro house musician, record producer, and founder of Dim Mak Records
- Gregg Araki, B.A. 1982 – film director, producer, and screenwriter; winner of a Cannes Film Festival award
- Tobin Armbrust, B.A. – film producer, president of Worldwide Productions and Acquisitions for Exclusive Media
- Tal Avitzur, M.A. 1985 – sculptor
- Brandon Baker – actor, Johnny Tsunami
- Jack Bannon – actor, Art Donovan on Lou Grant
- Roko Belic, attended – film director and producer; winner of Sundance Film Festival award
- Lo Bosworth, attended – reality television participant on Laguna Beach: The Real Orange County and The Hills
- Benjamin Bratt, B.F.A. 1986 – actor, Law & Order, Private Practice, Miss Congeniality
- Lisa Bruce, B.A. 1983 – film producer, The Theory of Everything
- Yau-Man Chan, M.S. 1977 – reality television participant on Survivor: Fiji and Survivor: Micronesia
- Kayte Christensen, B.A. 2002 – sports commentator and WNBA player
- Claudia Cowan, attended – television journalist for Fox News Channel
- Steve Czaban, B.S. 1990 – sports radio talk show host on Yahoo! Sports Radio and ESPN 980
- Beth Rudin DeWoody, B.A. – arts patron, collector, curator, philanthropist
- Mark di Suvero, attended – sculptor and National Medal of Arts recipient
- Crystal Egger, B.A. 2000 – meteorologist for NBC4 Los Angeles and The Weather Channel
- Josh Elliott, B.A. 1993 – television journalist, NBC Sports, Today, Good Morning America
- Macduff Everton, B.A. 1981, M.F.A. 1984 – photographer and author
- Harris Faulkner, B.A. 1987 – newscaster and television host for Fox News Channel
- Scott Frank, B.A. 1982 – screenwriter, Minority Report, Marley & Me, The Wolverine
- Morgan J. Freeman, B.A. 1992 – producer and director, Laguna Beach: The Real Orange County and Teen Mom
- Tom Fruin, B.A. 1996 – sculptor
- Edi Gathegi, B.A. – actor, Superman, Twilight, X-Men: First Class
- Marc Germain, B.A. 1989 – radio talk show host known as Mr. KFI or Mr. KABC
- Dana E. Glauberman, 1990 – film editor, Juno, Up in the Air, and No Strings Attached
- James Gobel, MFA 1999, visual artist, painter, mix media,
- Toni Graphia, B.A. – television producer and writer
- Noah Harpster, B.F.A. 1998 – writer, actor, producer, director A Beautiful Day in the Neighborhood, Painkiller
- Mary Heebner, B.A. 1973, M.F.A. 1977 – painter and artist
- Paige Hemmis, B.A. 1994 – television host, Extreme Makeover: Home Edition
- Don Hertzfeldt, B.A. 1998 – animator and producer, Rejected and Billy's Balloon
- Peter Horton – actor, thirtysomething
- Iration, attended or were attending USCB when founding band in 2004; multiple albums have topped Billboard reggae charts
- Wayne Isham, attended – award-winning music video director, Enter Sandman, Livin' on a Prayer, Bye Bye Bye
- Jack Johnson, B.A. 1997 – four-time platinum singer-songwriter and musician, In Between Dreams and On and On
- Moshe Kasher, B.A. – standup comedian and actor
- Kazu Kibuishi, B.A. 2000 – graphic novelist, Flight and Copper
- Aja Naomi King, B.F.A. 2007 – actress, How to Get Away with Murder
- Ken Korach, B.A. 1975 – sports radio play-by-play announcer, Oakland Athletics
- Robby Krieger, attended – guitarist and songwriter, original member of The Doors
- John La Puma, B.A. 1978 – physician, chef, and New York Times bestselling author
- Jenna Lee, B.A. 2002 – newscaster and television host of Happening Now on Fox News Channel
- Christine Lehner, B.A. 1973 – author
- Harvey Levin, B.A. 1972 – founder and managing editor of TMZ
- Audra Lowe, B.A. 1993 – television host of The Broadway Channel and formerly The Better Show
- Jordan Maron, attended – YouTuber and Twitch streamer
- Enrique Martinez Celaya, M.F.A. 1994 – artist
- Lon McEachern, B.A. 1980 – television broadcaster, ESPN's World Series of Poker
- Chanel Miller, B.A. 2014 – author of Know My Name: A Memoir and Emily Doe of People v. Turner
- Joel A. Miller, B.A. 1998 – author of Memoir of a Roadie, and writer, producer, director of The Still Life (2007 film)
- Matthew Mishory, B.A. 2004 – film and commercial director
- Mary Miss, B.A. 1966 – environmental artist
- Richard Munson – author
- Jeff Nathanson, attended – screenwriter, for Indiana Jones and the Kingdom of the Crystal Skull and Catch Me If You Can
- Nekrogoblikon – metal band formed as live act by UCSB students in 2006
- Julie Nimoy – producer and director, Remembering Leonard Nimoy
- Benito Pastoriza Iyodo, M.A. 1981 – author
- Cathy Podewell – actress, portrayed Cally Harper Ewing on Dallas
- Rebelution – reggae rock band formed in Isla Vista composed of four UCSB graduates
- Philipp Richardsen, D.M.A. 2007 – Austrian classical pianist
- Jim Rome, B.A. 1987 – sports talk show host, The Jim Rome Show and Jim Rome Is Burning
- Barbara Rush, 1948 – Golden Globe-winning actress, Bigger Than Life, The Young Philadelphians, Robin and the 7 Hoods, Hombre, Peyton Place
- Robin Sax – legal analyst and commentator
- Andrew Schulz, B.A. 1995 – comedian, podcaster, television host (Schulz Saves America, The Brilliant Idiots, Guy Code)
- Richard Serra, B.A. 1961 – minimalist sculptor
- Brad Silberling, B.A. 1984 – film producer and director, Casper, Lemony Snicket's A Series of Unfortunate Events
- L. J. Smith, B.A. 1987 – New York Times bestselling author of The Vampire Diaries and The Secret Circle series
- Mark Andrew Smith, B.A. 2002 – comic book writer and graphic novelist
- Bahar Soomekh, B.A. 1997 – actress, Saw III
- Andrew Spence, M.F.A. 1971 – painter
- Andrea Sperling, B.A. 1990 – film producer
- Wolfgang Stoerchle, M.F.A. 1968 – conceptual artist
- Charissa Thompson, B.A. 2004 – television host, Fox Sports Live and Extra
- Fred Toye, B.A. – television director
- Jerry Trainor, B.F.A. – actor and comedian, iCarly
- Katy Tur, B.A. 2005 – television journalist, NBC News
- Leah Turner, attended – country music singer
- Patrick Vlaskovits, B.A., M.A. – New York Times bestselling author and entrepreneur
- Alie Ward, B.A. – writer, actress, and television and podcast host, Ologies
- Dasha Zhukova, B.A. 2004 – model and domestic partner of Roman Abramovich
- Sean Casey, IMAX Filmmaker

== Astronauts ==
- Joseph M. Acaba, B.S. 1990 – participated with STS-119
- Leroy Chiao, M.S. 1985, Ph.D. 1987 – commander of Expedition 10 aboard International Space Station and participated with STS-65, STS-72, and STS-92
- José M. Hernández, M.S. 1986 – participated with STS-128

== Athletics ==
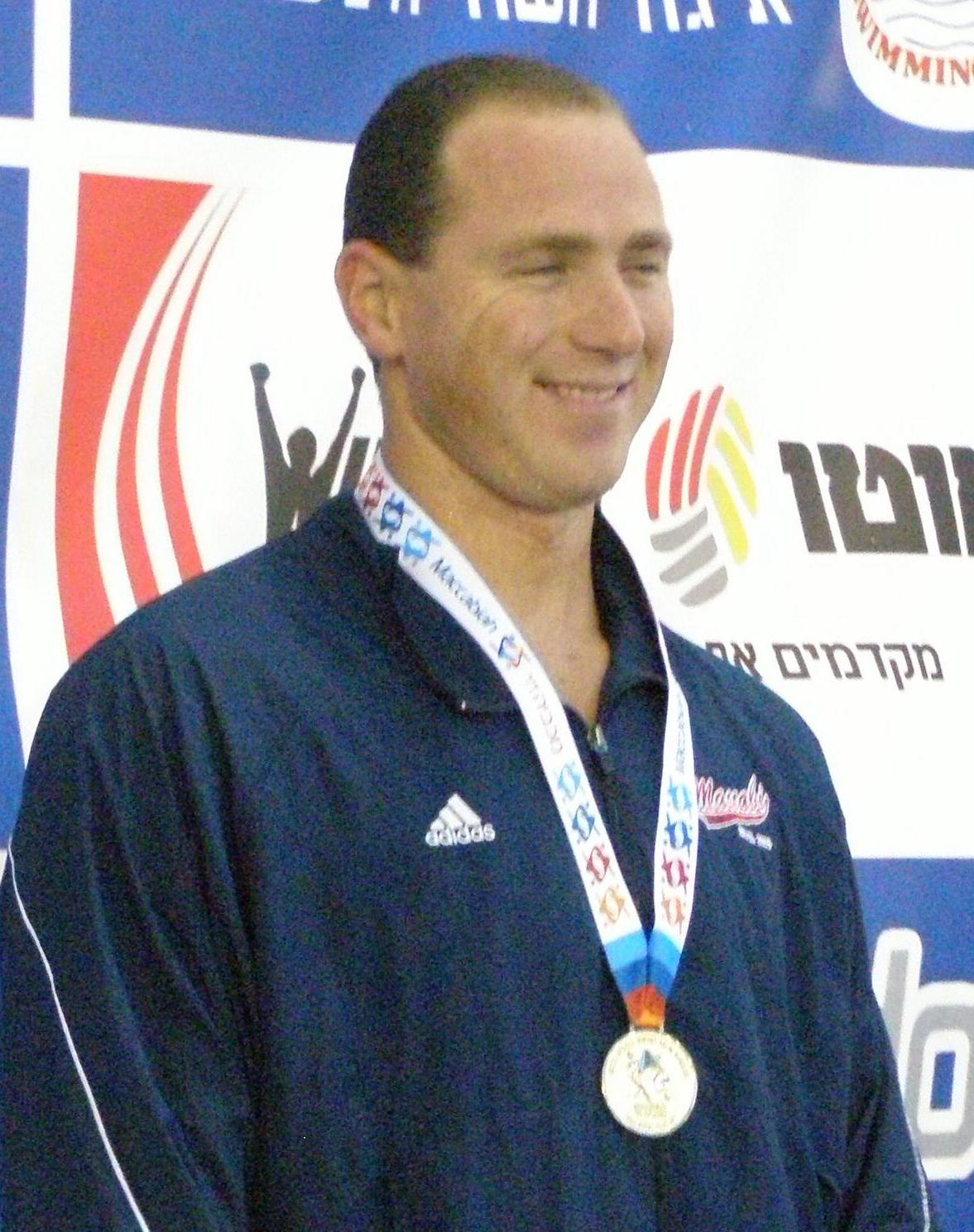
Jason Lezak

- Eric Avila – plays for FC Dallas of the MLS
- Shane Bieber – Major League Baseball pitcher for the Cleveland Indians, Cy Young Award in 2020
- Joe Cannon – 2002 and 2004 MLS Goalkeeper of the Year, goalkeeper for Vancouver Whitecaps, former member of U.S. National Team
- Kayte Christensen – WNBA player for the Phoenix Mercury, Houston Comets, and Chicago Sky; color commentator for the Sacramento Kings
- Cori Close – women's basketball head coach, UCLA
- Chris Cope – professional mixed martial artist, formerly competing for Strikeforce and Ultimate Fighting Championship
- Lynne Cox – long-distance open-water swimmer, writer and speaker
- Lucius Davis (born 1970) – basketball player
- Noah Davis (born 1997) – baseball pitcher for the Colorado Rockies in MLB
- Larry Dierker – 1969 and 1971 Major League Baseball All-Star pitcher and 1998 NL Manager of the Year for Houston Astros
- Eric Fonoimoana – 2000 Olympic Games gold medalist in beach volleyball
- Don Ford – former basketball power forward in the NBA for the Los Angeles Lakers and Cleveland Cavaliers
- Rob Friend – soccer striker for Borussia Mönchengladbach of the German Bundesliga and Canadian National Team
- Tom Gamboa – baseball coach and manager
- Scott Garson – college basketball coach
- Bill Geivett – senior vice president, Major League Baseball Operations, assistant GM for Colorado Rockies
- Max Heidegger (born 1997) – American-Israeli basketball player in the Israeli Basketball Premier League
- Mario Hollands – pitcher for Philadelphia Phillies
- Andy Iro – plays for Columbus Crew of the MLS
- Carin Jennings – 1991 FIFA Women's World Cup and Golden Ball winner, 1996 Olympic Games gold medalist in soccer; National Soccer Hall of Fame (personal) and United States Olympic Hall of Fame (as 1996 Women's Soccer team) inductee
- Orlando Johnson – pro basketball player for Baskonia of Euroleague and NBA's Sacramento Kings, Indiana Pacers, Phoenix Suns
- Neil Jones – has featured for New Zealand National Team, assistant coach for UCSB
- Alan Keely – plays in Ireland for Shelbourne F.C. of FAI eircom League of Ireland First Division
- Dan Kennedy – plays for Club Deportivo Chivas USA of MLS
- Stuart Krohn (born 1962) – professional rugby union player
- Jason Lezak (born 1975) – four-time Olympic gold medalist and seven-time Olympic medalist swimmer in 2000, 2004, and 2008 Olympic Games
- Tony Lochhead – soccer left back for Wellington Phoenix FC of Australian A-League and New Zealand National Team
- Thiago Martins – soccer striker for FK Bodø/Glimt of the Norwegian Tippeligaen
- Kevin McClatchy – co-owner of Major League Baseball's Pittsburgh Pirates franchise
- David McGill – plays in Ireland for Shelbourne F.C. of the FAI eircom League of Ireland First Division
- Tino Nuñez – plays for Real Salt Lake of MLS
- James Nunnally (born 1990) – basketball player for Maccabi Tel Aviv of the Israeli Basketball Premier League and Euroleague
- Barbara Nwaba – 2015 American heptathlon champion
- Chris Pontius – plays for D.C. United of MLS
- Kyle Reynish – plays for Real Salt Lake of MLS
- Todd Rogers – 2008 Olympic Games gold medalist in Beach Volleyball; 1997 AVP Rookie of the Year, 2004-2007 AVP Best Defensive Player, 2006 AVP MVP, 2007 AVP Champion
- Tyler Rosenlund – has featured for Canadian National Team
- Richard Schroeder – U.S. Olympic swimming double gold medalist, 1984 and 1988
- Skip Schumaker – former MLB second baseman for Cincinnati Reds
- Brian Shaw – three-time (2000, 2001, 2002) NBA champion point guard for Los Angeles Lakers, former head coach of Denver Nuggets
- Ryan Spilborghs – former MLB center fielder for Colorado Rockies
- Gabe Vincent – basketball player in the NBA for the Miami Heat and Los Angeles Lakers
- Bobby Webster – NBA general manager
- Alan Williams – two-time NCAA rebounding leader and current player for the Phoenix Suns
- Craig Wilson – U.S. Olympic water polo goalie silver medalist in 1984 and 1988 Olympic Games; participant in 1992 Games
- Michael Young – retired five-time (2004–2008) MLB All-Star shortstop for the Texas Rangers and 2006 MLB All Star Game MVP
- Barry Zito – three-time (2002, 2003, 2006) MLB All-Star pitcher and 2002 American League Cy Young Award winner

== Business leaders and entrepreneurs ==
- Robert D. Arnott, B.S. 1977 – investor and writer, founder and CEO of Research Affiliates, LLC
- Dave Asprey, B.S. – founder of Bulletproof 360
- Josh Berman, B.A. 1991 – entrepreneur; co-founder and former COO of Myspace.com
- Grady Booch, M.S. 1979 – software engineer; co-creator of the Unified Modeling Language; Fellow of ACM, IBM, and IEEE
- Tom Bruggere, B.A. 1968 – entrepreneur and founder of Mentor Graphics, former chairman of the board of Stamps.com
- Anders Dahlvig, M.A. 1982 – former CEO and president of IKEA
- Robert Duggan – CEO of Pharmacyclics Inc.
- Tracy Gray, BA – social-impact investor, founder of The 22 Fund
- Logan Green, B.A. 2006 – co-founder and CEO of Lyft and Zimride
- Jeffrey O. Henley, B.A. 1966 – vice chairman and former chairman of Oracle Corporation
- Blair Hull, B.A. 1965 – businessman, investor, and founder of Ketchum Trading; founder of Hull Trading Company
- Ryan Kavanaugh, attended – film financier, founder and CEO of Relativity Media
- Ryland King, B.S. 2012 – entrepreneur, non-profit founder of Sprout Up, Surf Trip List
- Karl F. Lopker, B.S. 1973 – CEO of QAD Inc, co-founder of Deckers Outdoor Corporation
- Pamela Lopker, B.A. 1977 – founder and president of QAD Inc
- Richard Nanula, B.A. 1982 – former CFO of The Walt Disney Company and Amgen, former chairman of Colony Capital and Miramax
- Priya Narasimhan, M.S. 1995, Ph.D. 1999 – founder and CEO of YinzCam, electrical & computer engineering professor at Carnegie Mellon University
- Marc Nathanson, M.A. 1969 – entrepreneur and philanthropist, founder and former CEO of Falcon Cable TV
- Doug Otto, B.A. 1973 – co-founder of Deckers Outdoor Corporation
- Yngve Slyngstad, M.A. – CEO of Norges Bank Investment Management
- Peter Sperling, B.A. – educator and businessman, chairman of Apollo Group
- Nick Swinmurn, B.A. 1995 – founder and former CEO of Zappos
- Chade-Meng Tan, M.S. 2000 – software engineer, New York Times bestselling author, and employee number 107 for Google
- Kazuhiro Tsuga, M.S. 1986 – president of Panasonic
- Brett White, B.A. 1984 – chairman and chief executive officer of Cushman & Wakefield; former CEO of CBRE Group

== Government, law, and public policy ==
- Kwadwo Afari-Gyan, Ph.D. 1974 – chairman of the Electoral Commission of Ghana
- John Avalos, B.A. 1988 – member of the San Francisco Board of Supervisors
- Paul Bardacke, B.A. 1966 – attorney general of New Mexico
- Sam Blakeslee, Ph.D. 1989 – member of the California State Senate and California State Assembly
- Barbara Bodine, B.A. 1970 – U.S. ambassador to Yemen during the USS Cole bombing
- Barry Brucker, B.A. – mayor of Beverly Hills, California
- Joan Buchanan, B.A. 1973 – member of the California State Assembly
- Lois Capps, M.A. 1990 – member of the United States House of Representatives
- Salud Carbajal, B.A. 1990 – member of the United States House of Representatives
- Tony Cardenas, B.A. 1986 – member of the United States House of Representatives
- Norris Cochran, B.A. 1993 – acting United States Secretary of Health and Human Services
- Kevin de León, attended – member of the Los Angeles City Council and former member of the California State Legislature
- Delaine Eastin, M.A. 1971 – California State Superintendent of Public Instruction and member of the California State Assembly
- Valerie Baker Fairbank, B.A. 1971, M.A. 1972 – senior judge of the United States District Court for the Central District of California
- Raymond C. Fisher, B.A. 1961 – United States associate attorney general and senior judge of the United States Court of Appeals for the Ninth Circuit
- Jean Fuller, Ph.D. 1989 – minority leader and member of the California State Senate
- Ruth Ann Gaines, M.A. 1970 – member of the Iowa House of Representatives
- Marc Grossman, B.A. 1973 – Under Secretary of State for Political Affairs and United States Ambassador to Turkey
- Roger Hedgecock, 1968 – former mayor of San Diego and talk radio host
- John C. Hinderaker, B.A. 1991 - U.S. District Judge of the U.S. District Court for the District of Arizona
- Jared Huffman, B.A. 1986 – member of the United States House of Representatives
- Ken Khachigian, B.A. 1966 – political consultant and chief speechwriter for Ronald Reagan
- Betty Koed, B.A. 1983, M.A. 1991, Ph.D. 1999 – historian of the United States Senate
- Robert J. Lagomarsino, B.A. 1950 – member of the United States House of Representatives
- Brian Maienschein, B.A. 1991 – member of the California State Assembly
- Edward L. Masry, attended – attorney of the Hinkley groundwater contamination case made famous by Erin Brockovich
- Dionicio Morales, attended – Latino civil rights leader
- Ben Moss, B.A. 2014 - White House Staff Secretary, 2026-present
- Mariana Pfaelzer, B.A. 1949 – senior judge of the United States District Court for the Central District of California
- Richard W. Pollack, B.A. – associate justice of the Supreme Court of Hawaii
- Milan St. Protić, M.A. 1982, Ph.D. 1987 – Serbian ambassador to Switzerland and Federal Republic of Yugoslavian ambassador to the United States
- Austin Quinn-Davidson, B.A. 2001 – acting mayor of Anchorage, Alaska
- Nick Salazar, attended – member of the New Mexico House of Representatives
- Paul Seaton, attended – member of the Alaska House of Representatives
- Roslyn O. Silver, B.A. 1968 – senior judge of the United States District Court for the District of Arizona
- Matthew Steen – co-founder of Weather Underground
- Dave Uejio – acting director of the Consumer Financial Protection Bureau (CFPB)
- Knut Vollebaek – Norwegian diplomat and ambassador to the US
- Das Williams, MESM 2005 – member of the California State Assembly
- Joseph C. Wilson – U.S. Ambassador to Gabon and São Tomé and Príncipe; Distinguished Alumnus Award recipient; husband of Valerie Plame Wilson, classified CIA operative whose identity was leaked to the press in 2003

== Science ==
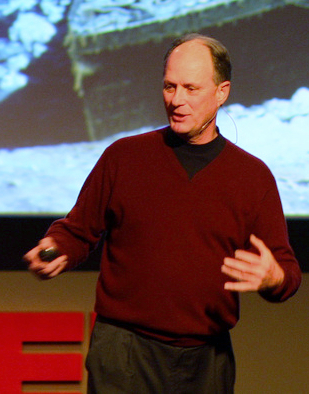
Robert Ballard, B.S. 1965 – discovered the Titanic

Name	Degree(s)	Notability	Ref.
Robert Ballard	B.S. 1965	oceanographer who discovered the wreck of the Titanic	
Alexei Filippenko	B.A. 1979	astrophysicist and professor of astronomy at the University of California, Berkeley	
Benjamin Halpern	Ph.D. 2003	marine biologist, ecologist, and 2016 A.G. Huntsman Award for Excellence in the Marine Sciences winner	
John R. Kirtley	B.A. 1971, Ph.D. 1976	physicist and co-winner of the 1998 Oliver E. Buckley Condensed Matter Prize	
Alison Murray	Ph.D. 1998	biochemist and Antarctic researcher	
Richard Nelson	Ph.D. 1972	cultural anthropologist	
Christine Siddoway	Ph.D. 1995	geologist, Antarctic researcher	
Deborah Steinberg	B.A. 1987	biological oceanographer, Antarctic researcher	
Amy Wetherby	Ph.D. 1982	autism research scientist	
Dawn Wright	Ph.D. 1994	geographer and oceanographer	

== Other notable alumni ==
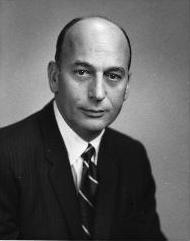
Robert Mardian

Name	Degree(s)	Notability	Ref.
Steve Barr	B.A. 1982	co-founder of Rock the Vote	
Tracie D. Hall	B.A. 1991	executive director of the American Library Association	
Kenneth Karmiole	B.A. 1968	bookseller and philanthropist	
Jeff Madsen	attended	2006 World Series of Poker Player of the Year and four-time WSOP bracelet winner	
Robert Mardian	attended	politician and one of the Watergate Seven	
Kathleen Soliah	B.A. c.1969	member of the Symbionese Liberation Army	
