= Re-exportation =

Exporting of imported goods without alteration

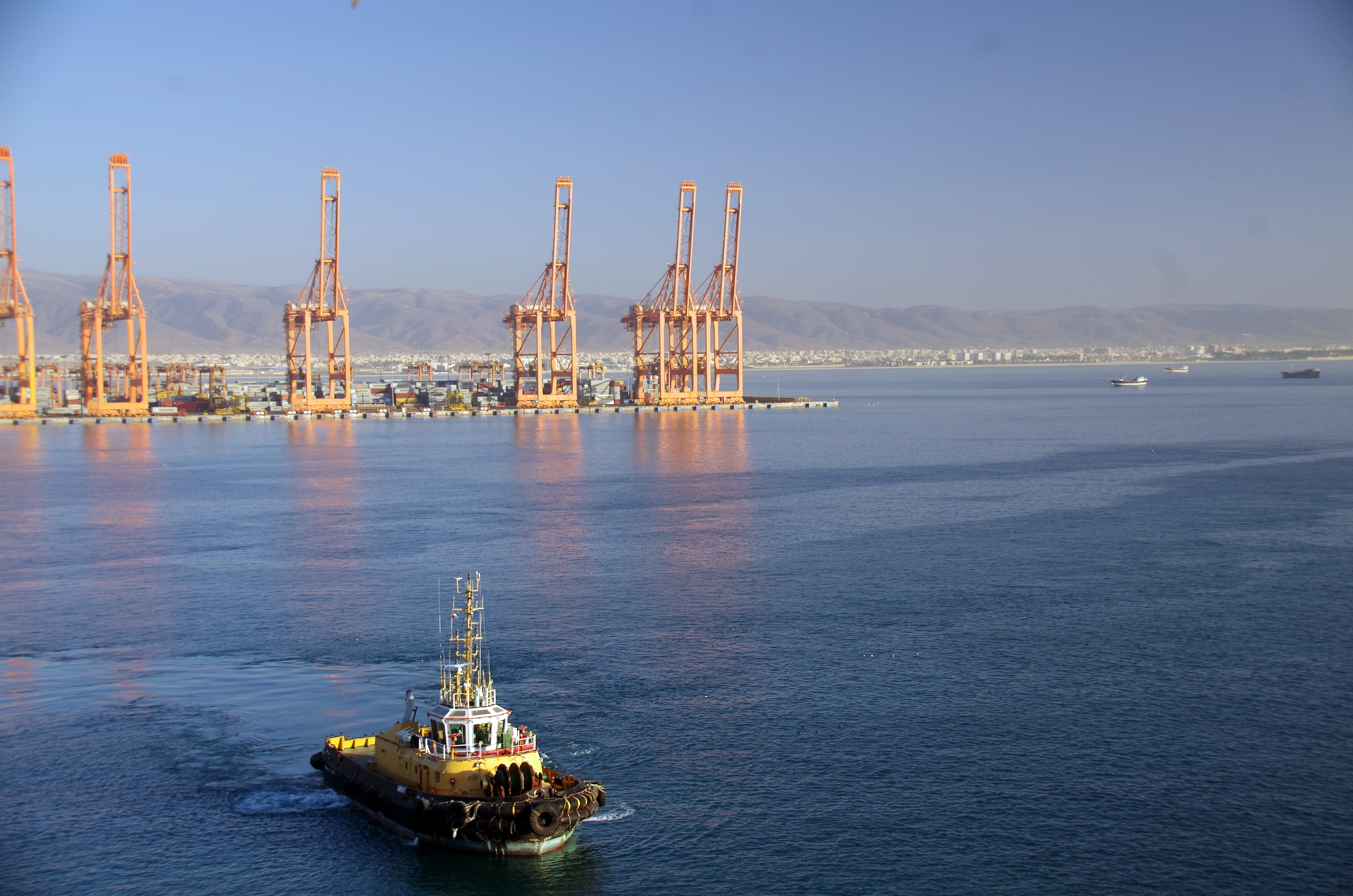
Salalah port

Re-exportation, also called entrepot trade, is a form of international trade in which a country exports goods which it previously imported without altering them. One such example could be when one member of a free trade agreement charges lower tariffs to external nations to win trade, and then re-exports the same product to another partner in the trade agreement, but tariff-free. Re-exportation can be used to avoid sanctions by other nations.

== Definition of re-export ==
Re-exports consist of foreign goods exported in the same state as previously imported, from the free circulation area, premises for inward processing or industrial free zones, directly to the rest of the world and from premises for customs warehousing or commercial free zones, to the rest of the world.

When dealing with trade data, it is essential to subtract re-exports from normal exports to arrive at the final value of exports. This is necessary because re-exports do not undergo any value-added processes, so cannot be counted towards a nation's exports.

== Examples ==
For example, the United Arab Emirates may have engaged in re-exportation of goods to Iran as a way for Iran to avoid U.S. trade sanctions against it. Thus re-exportation involves export without further processing or transformation of a good that has been imported. In contrast, Finland imported crude oil from the Soviet Union as part of bilateral trade between these two countries and refined the oil for export to other Western European countries but this was not re-exportation because the crude oil was refined before selling. Dubai has emerged as the major re-export center for the entire Middle East region.

== See also ==
- Re-importation
