= Brenda Sexton =

American film executive

Brenda Sexton is the head of Chicago Link Productions. Prior to that, she was a real estate broker, a film critic, and the managing director of the Illinois Film Office from 2003 to 2007. Her activities as managing director of the Illinois Film Office led to substantially increased movie production revenues in Chicago. She was given several awards for her support of arts and film in Chicago.

== Early life and education ==
Sexton grew up in Queens, New York, and dealt with poverty at a young age. Her father died when she was four years old. Sexton stated that, "[When I was] 6, my mom said, 'You're old enough to take care of yourself." Brenda Sexton began working at the age of eight, and by the time she was ten, she had her own bank account. She was the only one of her four siblings to finish high school.

In 1980, Sexton earned her MBA in International Business, and graduated with honors from American Graduate School of International Management. She studied in Japan, France, and the University of Denver while working toward her undergraduate degree.

== Career ==
=== Real estate ===
Sexton has worked in advertising, sales, and real estate. She spent 20 years in the real estate field. Her career began in 1981 when she began working at Irvine and Associates. Sexton was later employed at Galbreath Company. While at Galbreath, Sexton was appointed President of Corporate Services, until she left in 1997. In 2008, Sexton returned to real estate, and was hired as an Executive Vice-President of Colliers Bennett & Kahnweiler Inc.

=== Film ===
Sexton wrote film reviews for reelmoviecritic.com, taught classes with film critic, Michael Wilmington, interviewed celebrities, and covered the Cannes Film Festival.

In 2003, she was appointed to the position of managing director of the Illinois Film Office by Rod Blagojevich. Many people were skeptical of this decision, because Sexton did not have a strong background in the film business. Also, her ex-husband was a generous contributor to Blagojevich, donating $260,000 to his 2002 campaign. He recommended Sexton to Blagojevich.

Before she took office, filmmakers were only spending $25 million in Illinois. Sexton was able to get major films to shoot in Chicago including, Ocean's Twelve, The Dark Knight, The Weatherman, and The Ice Harvest. Over one year, film-related revenues boosted to $62 million, a 147 percent increase. During her time in this position Sexton passed a tax credit bill that increased movie production in Chicago. This also created 15,000 jobs for crew and actors. In 2005, an estimated $90 million in revenue was expected thanks to several projects that were shot in Chicago including, The Break-Up and Prison Break.

In 2007, she started the Chicago Link Productions LLC. The group arranges private screenings and movie-related events in Chicago, Sundance, and Los Angeles.

Sexton has served on various boards, including the Executive Board of the Chicago Film Critic's Association, the Executive Board of the Goodman Theatre Women's Board, and the Executive Board of PAWS Chicago. She was also a volunteer for the City of Chicago and Latin School, and a member of the Economic Club of Chicago.

== Awards ==
In 2005, the Chicago Tribune chose Sexton as the "Chicagoan of the Year." That same year, Lawyers for the Creative Arts in Chicago selected her as their award recipient for outstanding supporter of the arts. In 2007, she was awarded a city resolution for "reinvigorating Chicago's film and television industry."

== Personal life ==
Sexton was married to attorney James Ryndak. They later divorced. In 1995, she married Blair Hull, former candidate for Democratic nomination to the United States Senate. They divorced in 1998. Within the next three years, they would again marry and divorce. Although Sexton has had a successful career, her divorce earned her much press. She said, "It's unbelievable that a woman's achievement can still be tied to who she is married to." She has one daughter. As of 2013, Sexton was living in Palm Desert, California.
