= Al Francesco =

American blackjack player and gambling strategist

- Born: Frank Schipani; December 2, 1933; Gary, Indiana, U.S.
- Died: February 3, 2024 (aged 90)
- Occupation: Professional gambler

Al Francesco (born Frank Schipani; December 2, 1933 – February 3, 2024) was an American blackjack player and gambling strategist. Considered to be “The Godfather of Blackjack”, Francesco is recognized as the creator of the team play concept, the “big player” strategy, and the drop card method. Beginning in 1971, Francesco personally recruited and trained disciplined card counters to work together in teams to beat the casinos. Franceso's teams of blackjack players would station themselves at various blackjack tables to count the decks, and when the mathematical odds turned in their favor, the counters would signal a “Big Player” to come to the table and place large wagers until the edge was lost and once again favored the dealer. While most card counters would eventually be discovered by casinos through their betting patterns and banned from further play, Francesco's unique team concept helped his players evade detection and continue winning.

At its peak, Francesco's team was taking casino trips with up to 22 members, including three “Big Players”: Ken Uston, Bill Erb, and Blair Hull. In 1977, after team member Ken Uston published a book called “The Big Player” which exposed the group and their methods, Francesco and his associates were largely barred from casinos, and the team fell apart.

Even though he personally retired from professional play, Francesco's system of team blackjack play lived on. It was adopted and replicated with great success by the MIT blackjack team, the Czech team, the Hyland team, and the Greeks team. Francesco's methods were featured in the book Bringing Down the House, and in the 2008 Hollywood film 21.

In 2002, because of his long and lasting influence on the game, Francesco was inducted into The Blackjack Hall of Fame as an inaugural member.

== History ==
Born in Gary, Indiana, Francesco was drawn to gambling and card games early in life. By his late teens, he was already honing his skills in neighborhood games of Greek Rummy, and before long, Francesco was winning regularly. Eventually, he was earning $5,000 per year – then the equivalent to an average annual salary.

In 1963, Francesco moved to California. That same year, Edward O. Thorp’s book, ‘’Beat the Dealer” was published. The book demonstrated with mathematical proof that card counting could overcome the casinos’ advantage in blackjack, and laid out the details of Thorpe's 10 Count System for card counting.

After significant study and practice, Francesco found consistent success at the blackjack tables. In fact, he was winning so frequently that multiple casinos began banning him from their blackjack tables. Once open gambling opportunities proved too difficult, Francesco stopped playing for nearly 8 years. During that time, casinos began to evolve to lower the advantage card counters were able to achieve at their tables. They stopped playing blackjack with a single deck and began dealing with four deck shoes.

Francesco was introduced to the Revere Advance Count method when another mathematician turned author, Lawrence Revere, published a new card counting method in his 1969 book, “Playing Blackjack as a Business.” The new Revere strategy proved to be a winning one for Francesco, and ultimately brought him back to the casinos to exploit his advantage once again. But just as happened before, the more Francesco won, the fewer casino floors on which he was allowed to gamble.

=== The Big Player ===
Success for a card counter depended not only on strategy and discipline, but also on avoiding detection by dealers, pit bosses, and casino security.

During a blackjack game in Lake Tahoe, Francesco developed an alternative approach. Casinos often monitored individual players for fluctuating betting patterns associated with card counting, but did not always account for coordinated play between multiple individuals. In this approach, Francesco's brother was playing blackjack and betting $1 per hand and upping his bet to $5 when he felt the remaining deck held an advantaged count for him.

To casino staff, Francesco appeared to be an independent player joining the game, while the coordinated betting strategy allowed them to act on advantageous counts.

Throughout the 1970s, Francesco recruited, interviewed, tested, and trained dozens of card counters, utilizing the Revere Advanced Point Count System. He determined the optimal team size was seven members; six card counters, and one "big player" to step in with large wagers when the odds favored him. From 1971 to 1977, Francesco's teams traveled to casinos all over the world: Las Vegas, France, the Bahamas, Panama, Korea, Monte Carlo, and more, and won millions.

== Personal life ==
“Al Francesco” is the most well known pseudonym used by Frank Schipani during his gaming exploits; other aliases used throughout his gambling career include "Frank Salerno" and "Frank Fisano." Frank Schipani resided in Richmond, California, and remained active in the gaming world until his death. While he had largely retired from the blackjack tables, Schipani managed a large banking operation throughout California's many card rooms to facilitate private betting. He was also an avid horse racing fan, and tried to seek a data-driven edge in the sport. He died on February 4, 2024, at the age of 90.
