= R. Scott Morris =

- Born: Indianapolis, Indiana
- Education: B.A. University of Chicago; M.B.A. University of Chicago
- Occupation: Financial services
- Website: PolishedU.com; RScottMorrisConsulting.com

R. Scott Morris is an American author, financial engineer and quantitative consultant. He is president of Morris Consulting, LLC, Chief Investment Strategist of Blackthorne Capital Management, LLC, and was CEO of the Boston Options Exchange from 2006 to 2008. He has also was a Managing Director of Goldman Sachs and Partner at Hull Trading Company.

== Education and Hull Trading ==
Morris was born in Indianapolis, Indiana, and attended Pike High School. After completing a degree in economics at the University of Chicago in 1986, he entered a rapidly changing futures industry as the NYSE and NASDAQ began trading equity options contracts. As an associate for GNP commodities, Morris developed strategies for risk hedging and management and began his lifelong research into algorithmic trading.

After joining a team of mathematicians and scientists working under Blair Hull at Hull Trading Company, he obtained an M.B.A from the University of Chicago, where he specialized in both finance and statistics. During his tenure with Hull Trading, Morris engineered electronic option pricing systems and developed option pricing and volatility models, eventually becoming a Partner and the Director of Financial Engineering.

== Career ==
=== Goldman Sachs and Boston Options Exchange ===
Hull Trading Company was acquired by Goldman Sachs in 1999 for $531 million. Morris joined Goldman Sachs, where he managed the equity trading financial engineering groups and continued his work on trading systems and statistical modeling. After two years, he became a managing director and led the firm's algorithmic trading division at the Automated Execution Strategies desk.

In 2006, Morris became CEO of the Boston Options Exchange Group, an automated equity options stock exchange. As CEO, Morris continued his engineering work, developing execution speed and messaging capacity for hedge funds and algorithmic traders.

Morris led the implementation of the Sola Trading platform and PIP price improvement algorithm. He departed in 2008 after the TMX majority ownership acquisition.

=== Consulting and writing ===
Morris is the founder of Morris Consulting, LLC, which develops quantitative models and automated trading strategies, and advises large trading firms on regulatory relations, risk management, and recruiting. He has spoken at numerous educational and industry events and has lectured at the Chicago Board Options Exchange Risk Management Conference, the Futures Industry Association, and the Security Traders Association of Chicago.

In 2002, he lectured on volume-price ratios and optimal execution at the Computational Finance program at Carnegie Mellon, and he is currently a guest lecturer for the University of Chicago Careers in Business program. Morris is also the author of Polished, a careers resource book that teaches resume, cover letter, and interview skills to college students and other first-time job seekers.

=== Blackthorne Capital Management ===
In July 2016, Morris joined Blackthorne Capital Management as the Head of Research and Strategy Design. He has spearheaded the design and implementation of Blackthorne’s Sentiment Enhanced trading models.

In 2018, Morris was named Chief Investment Strategist of Blackthorne Capital Management, LLC.
