= Shane Bieber =

American baseball player (born 1995)

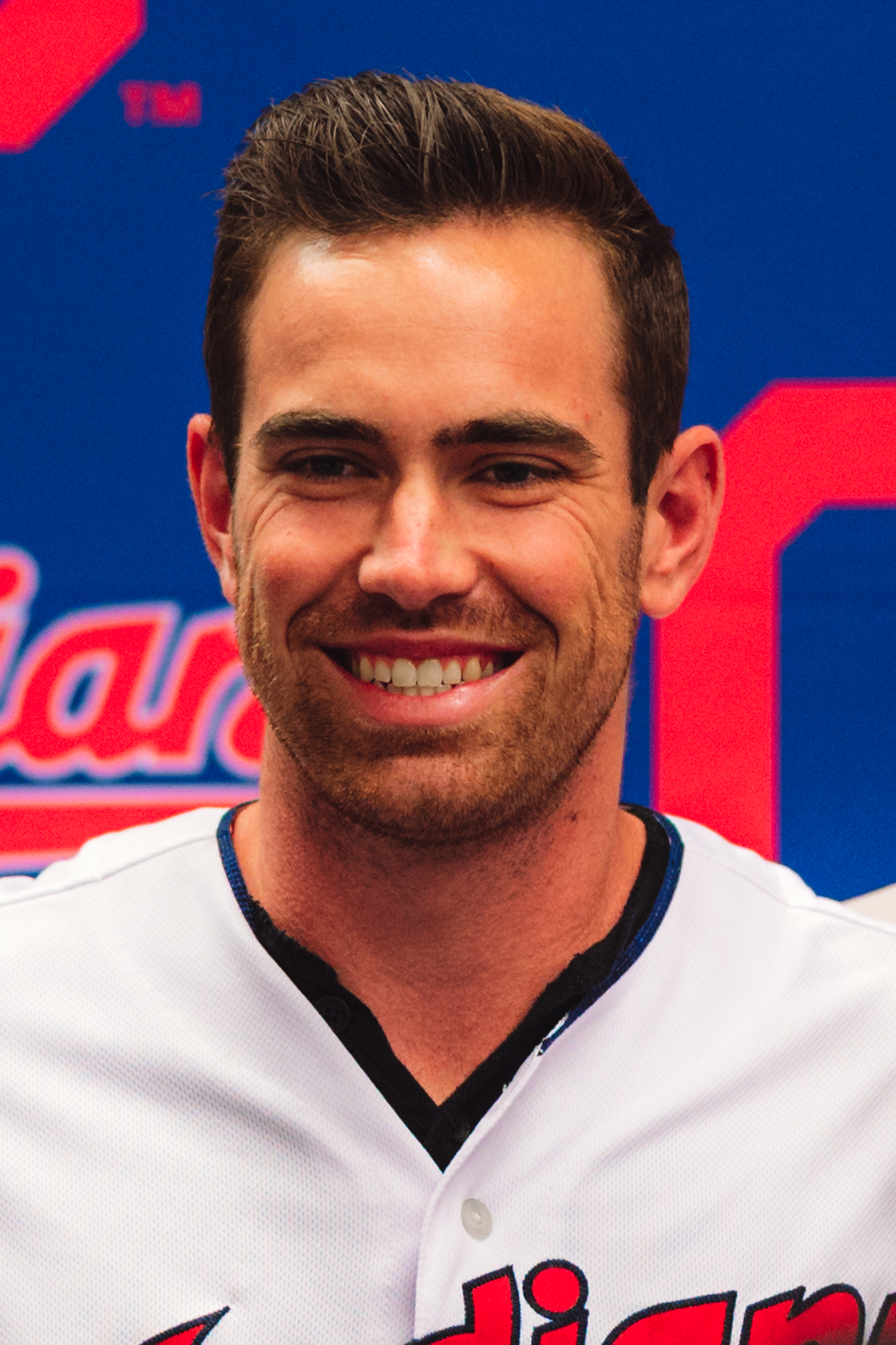
- Bieber with the Cleveland Indians in 2020

Free agent
- Pitcher
- Born: May 31, 1995 (age 31); Orange, California, U.S.
- Bats: Right Throws: Right

MLB debut
- May 31, 2018, for the Cleveland Indians

MLB statistics (through 2026 season)
- Win–loss record: 71–36
- Earned run average: 3.31
- Strikeouts: 1,039
- Stats at Baseball Reference

Teams
- Cleveland Indians / Guardians (2018–2024); Toronto Blue Jays (2025–2026)

Career highlights and awards
- 2× All-Star (2019, 2021); AL Cy Young Award (2020); Triple Crown (2020); All-MLB First Team (2020); Gold Glove Award (2022); AL wins leader (2020); AL ERA leader (2020); MLB strikeout leader (2020)

Shane Robert Bieber (born May 31, 1995) is an American professional baseball pitcher who is a free agent. He has played in Major League Baseball (MLB) for the Cleveland Indians / Guardians and Toronto Blue Jays. As a walk-on, Bieber played college baseball for the UC Santa Barbara Gauchos. He was selected by the Cleveland Indians in the fourth round of the 2016 MLB draft, and made his MLB debut with them in 2018. Bieber was named an All-Star in 2019 and 2021, and received the American League's 2020 Cy Young Award.

== Early life ==
Shane Robert Bieber was born on May 31, 1995, in Orange, California. Bieber attended Laguna Hills High School in Laguna Hills, California. Bieber's pitch speed reached the mid-80s as a junior and his command was very strong. He was recruited to play college baseball at University of California, Santa Barbara as a walk-on and did not receive much attention from many other programs. As a high school senior in 2013, he pitched to an 8–4 record with a 1.40 ERA.

== College career ==
After graduating in 2013, Bieber enrolled at the University of California, Santa Barbara where he played for the UC Santa Barbara Gauchos baseball team as a walk-on. He earned a scholarship by his sophomore year. In 2014, he played collegiate summer baseball in the West Coast League for the Cowlitz Black Bears. In 2015, he played collegiate summer baseball in the Cape Cod Baseball League for the Yarmouth-Dennis Red Sox. In 2016, his junior year, he went 12–4 with a 2.74 ERA in 18 starts.

== Professional career ==
=== Draft and minor leagues ===
Bieber was drafted by the Cleveland Indians in the fourth round of the 2016 Major League Baseball draft. Bieber signed and made his professional debut with the Mahoning Valley Scrappers, where he spent the whole season, posting a 0.38 ERA in 24 innings. He spent 2017 with the Lake County Captains, Lynchburg Hillcats, and Akron RubberDucks, pitching to a combined 10–5 record with a 2.86 ERA in 28 starts between the three teams.

On May 25, 2018, Bieber pitched a rain-shortened seven-inning no-hitter for the Triple-A Columbus Clippers against the Gwinnett Stripers.

=== Cleveland Indians / Guardians (2018–2024) ===
==== 2018–19 ====
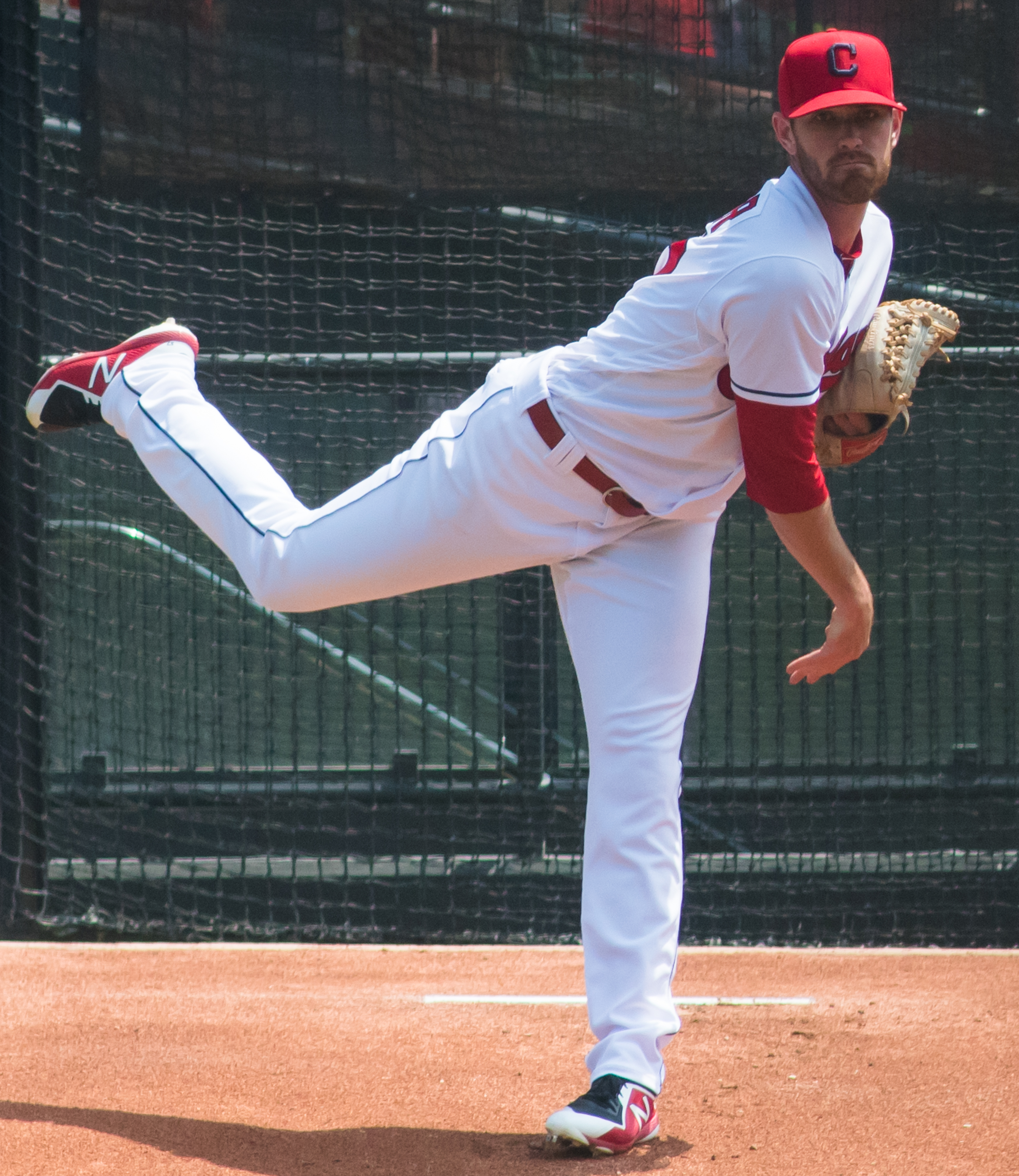
Bieber in the bullpen at Progressive Field in 2018

The Indians purchased Bieber's contract on May 31, 2018, and added him to their active roster. He made his major league debut that evening, starting against the Minnesota Twins at Target Field. He pitched 5 2/3 innings, giving up four runs (all earned) and eight hits while walking one and striking out six as the Indians defeated Minnesota 9–8. Bieber finished his rookie season with an 11–5 record, a 4.55 ERA, and 118 strikeouts in 20 appearances.

Owning a 7–3 record with a 3.54 ERA over 18 games (17 starts) to begin the 2019 season, Bieber was named an MLB All-Star for the first time, for the All-Star Game played at Progressive Field in Cleveland. He struck out the side on 19 pitches in the fifth inning as the American League won, 4–3. He received the All-Star Game Most Valuable Player Award. Bieber finished the season with a 15–8 record in 34 games (33 starts). In 214 1/3 innings, he struck out 259 batters. For the season, he received mention for the Cy Young Award voting for the first time, placing fourth in the American League.

==== 2020: Cy Young, Pitching Triple Crown ====
The Indians made Bieber their Opening Day starting pitcher in 2020. They faced the Kansas City Royals on July 24, 2020, at Progressive Field. Bieber struck out 14 batters in six innings in a 2–0 victory, setting a team record for most strikeouts by a starting pitcher on Opening Day. In his next start on July 30 versus the Minnesota Twins, he struck out 13 batters in eight innings, tying Karl Spooner for the most strikeouts by a pitcher in their first two starts in a season.

In August, Bieber started six games and recorded a 1.63 ERA with 57 strikeouts, including five starts with double figures in strikeouts. Upon reaching 50 innings for the season, Bieber had tallied 84 strikeouts, the most by a starting pitcher in MLB history in that span, according to the Elias Sports Bureau. At the end of the month, he had led the majors in ERA (1.20), strikeouts (84), wins (six), and innings (52 2/3). He was named American League Pitcher of the Month, his first monthly award in the major leagues. Bieber reached 100 strikeouts at the 62 1/3-inning mark versus Minnesota, the fastest in terms of innings pitched in one season in MLB history, passing Max Scherzer with 63 innings in 2018.

For the 2020 season, Bieber became the first pitcher since Justin Verlander (who won in 2011 with the Detroit Tigers), to capture the American League pitching triple crown (8 wins, 1.63 ERA, 122 strikeouts) as the AL leader in each of the three categories. He also led the AL in WAR (3.2), won-loss percentage (.889), fewest hits per 9 IP (5.353), and strikeouts per 9 IP (14.198).

In the 2020 American League Wild Card Series against the New York Yankees, Bieber allowed seven runs on nine hits in 4 2/3 innings, and the Indians were defeated 12–3. They lost the best-of-three series, 2–0, following a 10–9 loss in game two. After the season, Bieber was awarded the AL Cy Young Award.

==== 2021 ====
Bieber was the Indians' Opening Day starter for the 2021 season. On June 14, Bieber was placed on the injured list with a subscapularis strain. He was later transferred to the 60-day injured list on July 25. Bieber was activated off of the injured list on September 24.

==== 2022 ====
On March 22, 2022, Bieber signed a $6 million contract with the Guardians, avoiding salary arbitration.

In 2022 he was 13–8 with a 2.88 ERA in 200 innings. After the season, Bieber won the Gold Glove Award, along with teammates Steven Kwan, Andrés Giménez, and Myles Straw.

==== 2023 ====
On January 13, 2023, Bieber agreed to a one-year, $10.01 million contract with the Guardians for the 2023 season, avoiding salary arbitration. After being placed on the 15-day injured list July 15 with elbow inflammation, Bieber was transferred to the 60-day injured list on July 24. On September 22, Bieber was activated from the injured list and slotted as the starting pitcher that day against the Baltimore Orioles.

==== 2024 ====
Bieber started the 2024 season allowing no runs and winning both of his starts while striking out a league–leading 20 batters in 12 innings pitched. However, on April 6, 2024, it was announced that Bieber would undergo Tommy John surgery to repair his ulnar collateral ligament, ending his season.

On December 11, 2024, Bieber re-signed with the Guardians on a one-year major league contract with a player option for the 2026 season.

=== Toronto Blue Jays (2025–present) ===
On July 31, 2025, the Guardians traded Bieber to the Toronto Blue Jays in exchange for Khal Stephen. At the time of the trade, Bieber had been working his way back from Tommy John surgery and had made four rehab starts in the minors. On August 22, Bieber was reinstated from the IL and made his debut for the Blue Jays against the Miami Marlins, pitching six innings, giving up one run, and striking out nine batters across 87 pitches. Bieber finished the season with a 4–2 record, a 3.57 ERA, and 37 strikeouts in 40 1/3 innings across seven starts.

On October 28, Bieber made his first career World Series start in Game 4 against the Los Angeles Dodgers at Dodger Stadium, allowing just four hits and one run in 5 1/3 innings. The Blue Jays won the game, with Bieber registering the win. He pitched out of the bullpen in Game 7 of the World Series. With the score tied 4–4 in the top of the 11th, he allowed the go-ahead home run to Will Smith to give the Dodgers a 5–4 lead and eventual Championship victory.

Bieber chose to pick up his $16 million option, remaining with the Blue Jays for the 2026 season. He was placed to the 60-day injured list on April 13, 2026, due to right elbow inflammation. Bieber was activated on June 23.

== Personal life ==
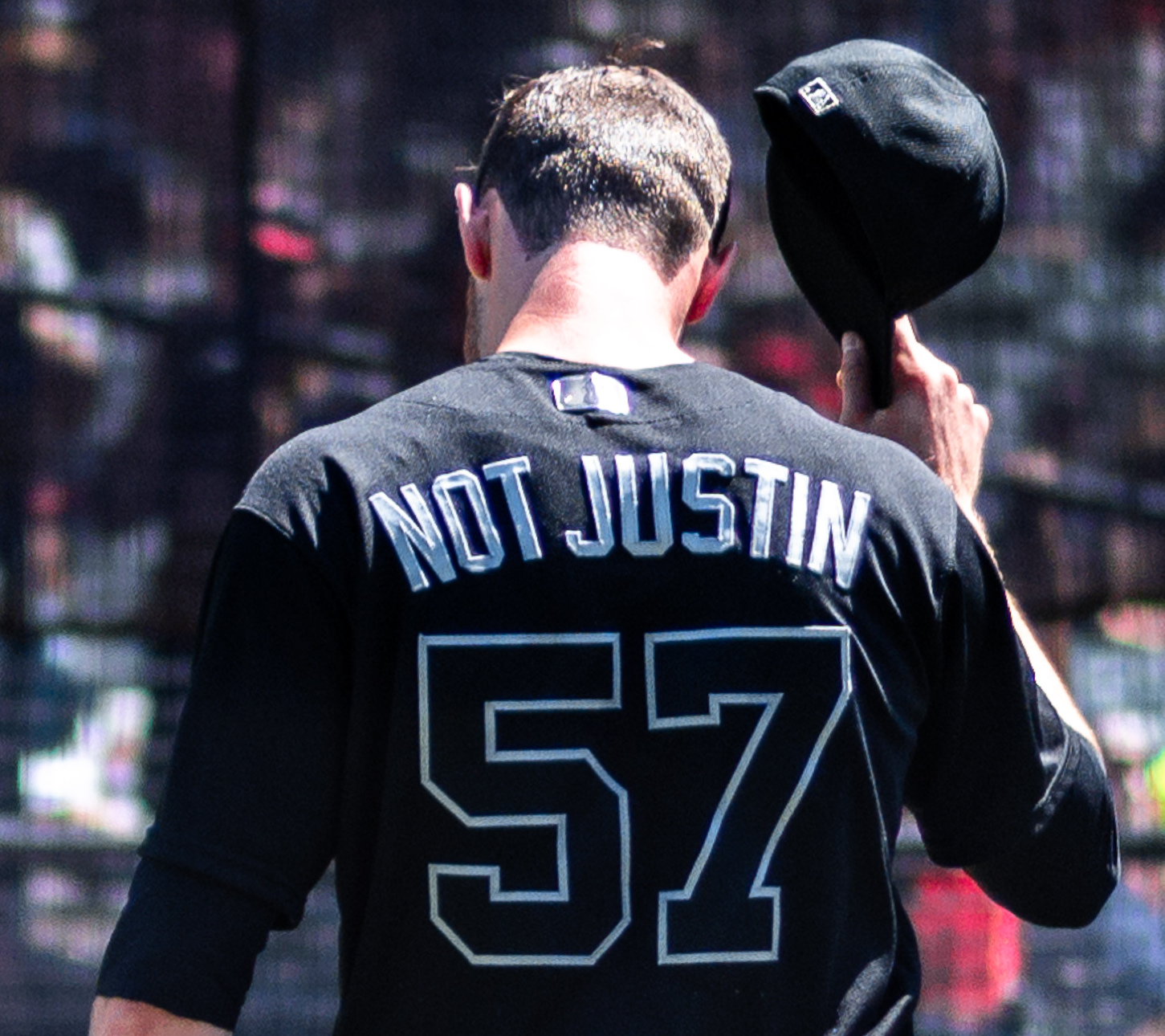
Bieber in his Not Justin Jersey

Bieber and his longtime girlfriend, Kara, got engaged in July 2021. They were married on January 21, 2023, in Malibu. During the baseball season, Bieber resides in Westlake, Ohio, a suburb of Cleveland. With the same last name as Canadian singer Justin Bieber, the Cleveland pitcher chose "Not Justin" as his nickname for Players Weekend in 2019. Justin was seen wearing a "Not Shane Bieber" jersey a few weeks later. Bieber later gifted Justin an Indians jersey. That same year, a Topps baseball card mistakenly called the pitcher "Justin" on the back of the card, with both Biebers joking about the mistake on Twitter.

== See also ==
- Cleveland Guardians award winners and league leaders
- List of Cleveland Guardians team records
- List of International League no-hitters
- List of Major League Baseball annual ERA leaders
- List of Major League Baseball annual shutout leaders
- List of Major League Baseball annual strikeout leaders
- List of Major League Baseball annual wins leaders
- List of University of California, Santa Barbara alumni
- List of World Series starting pitchers

Awards and achievements
Preceded by Gerrit Cole	American League Pitcher of the Month; August 2020	Succeeded by Chris Bassitt
