= Hans J. Van Miegroet =

American art historian (died 2024)

- Born: Hans Joris Van Miegroet; 1953
- Died: February 9, 2024 (aged 70–71); Durham, North Carolina, U.S.
- Occupations: Art historian, educator

Academic background
- Education: University of Ghent; University of California, Santa Barbara
- Thesis: Gerard David (ca. 1450-1523): Patronage and Artistic Preeminence at Bruges (1988)
- Doctoral advisor: Burr E. Wallen

Academic work
- Discipline: Art history
- Sub-discipline: Art market
- Institutions: Duke University

Hans Joris Van Miegroet (1953 – February 9, 2024) was a Belgian and American art historian and educator. Primarily a scholar of the art market in Europe, Van Miegroet was professor of Art and Art History at Duke University.

== Life and career ==
Van Miegroet was born in 1953 and graduated from the University of Ghent with a Master of Arts in Art History in 1983, and then moved to the United States to earn a Doctor of Philosophy from the University of California, Santa Barbara in 1988. His master's thesis was on the artist Konrad Witz, and he wrote a doctoral dissertation on Gerard David, supervised by Burr E. Wallen. In that year, Van Miegroet was hired as Assistant Professor of Art and Art History at Duke University, and in 1994, was promoted to Associate Professor. In 2005, he was elevated to full Professor. In the following year, Van Miegroet became chair of the art history department, a post that he held until 2014. He died on February 9, 2024, in a single-vehicle car crash near the Duke University campus.

== See also ==
- List of Duke University people
- List of University of California, Santa Barbara alumni
