= Blair Hull =

American businessman (born 1942)

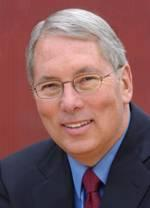
- Born: September 3, 1942 (age 84); Los Gatos, California, U.S.
- Education: University of California, Santa Barbara (BA); Santa Clara University (MBA)
- Occupations: Businessman; investor; politician
- Political party: Democratic
- Spouse: Cynthia Cranmer Erb (m. 2018)
- Website: HullInvest.com; HullTactical.com

Blair Hull (born September 3, 1942) is an American businessman, investor, and Democratic politician.

Hull founded Hull Trading Company in 1985 and served as the firm's chairman and chief executive officer before selling it to Goldman Sachs in 1999 for $531 million. The company, which leveraged technological innovations and quantitative models, was one of the world's premier market-making firms, trading on 28 exchanges in nine countries. Hull went on to found Hull Investments, LLC in 1999 which serves as a family office for three generations of the Hull family, and acts as parent company to a number of financial entities. In 2009, Hull founded Ketchum Trading, LLC, a proprietary trading firm that traded and provided liquidity in futures, options, cash equities and exchange-traded funds. And in 2013, Hull created Hull Tactical Asset Allocation, LLC. HTAA operates an actively managed ETF and utilizes advanced algorithms as well as macro and technical indicators to anticipate future market returns.

Trader Monthly recognized him for having executed one of "The 40 Greatest Trades of All Time" and Worth Magazine named him one of "Wall Street’s 25 Smartest Players." Hull has also been honored by The Options Industry Council as the 2014 recipient of the Joseph W. Sullivan Options Industry Achievement Award" in recognition of his outstanding lifetime contributions to the growth and integrity of the U.S. options market.

A longtime political activist and donor, Blair Hull sought the Illinois Democratic Party nomination as candidate for the U.S. Senate in 2004 as a champion of universal healthcare and efficiency in government. Barack Obama ultimately won that primary. Blair Hull remains active in the political arena as both an activist and donor. Hull is married to Cynthia Cranmer Erb, and is father to four adult children: Kristin, Megan, Jeff, and Courtney.

== Early life and education ==
=== Early years ===
Blair Hull was born in 1942, the son of Marson Hull and Jean Matlock Hull, and raised in Los Gatos, California—near what would later be called Silicon Valley. After completing high school, Hull went to work on the assembly line of a cannery factory to help support his family, ultimately joining Union Local 679 and earning himself a union card by the age of 19.

During the Vietnam buildup, Hull served six years in the United States Army. After reaching the rank of lieutenant and completing his military service, Blair Hull turned to the classroom, teaching high school level math and physics before becoming a student again himself and going on to higher education with the GI Bill, as his father had done before him.

He earned his Bachelor of Arts degree in Mathematics from the University of California, Santa Barbara, his MBA from Santa Clara University and graduated from the Harvard Owner/President Management Program.

While working full-time at a manufacturing company, Hull tested his mathematical and analytical skills at the blackjack tables in Las Vegas, where he proved to be a skilled and disciplined player. Hull took his accumulated winnings to the Pacific Stock Exchange, then to the Chicago financial exchanges. Once there, he established himself as a pioneer in the trading industry, revolutionizing the financial markets through the use of innovative models and state-of-the-art technology.

As Founder of Hull Trading Company, Blair Hull built a business from scratch in Illinois, created hundreds of jobs, and grew his company into one of the most successful trading firms in the country.

== Blackjack ==
In 2022, Blair Hull was inducted into the Blackjack Hall of Fame. Hull was a player in Al Francesco’s blackjack team in the mid-’70s, is responsible for the Hall of Fame’s success in forming its own 501-C3 Charitable Foundation, and is also the recipient of the first “Ed Thorp Lifetime Achievement Award.”

Trained in mathematics and computer science, Blair Hull first applied his skills and training to advantage play in blackjack, and then went on to develop an empirical model independent of Black–Scholes to use on the financial markets. Throughout the 1970s, Hull honed his system on the casino floors. As one of the “Big Players” on Al Francesco’s storied blackjack team, Blair beat the odds, or rather, beat the house by shifting the edge in his favor. By utilizing mathematical systems - first Edward O. Thorp's 10 Count Card system, and later Lawrence Revere's Advanced Point Count system - Hull and a team of skilled card players were able to determine when they gained an advantage over the dealer, and how best to bet to exploit that advantage. They consistently turned a profit, and their story is outlined in the book "The Big Player" by Ken Uston.

"When Hull played blackjack, he saw it not as a risk-taking endeavor but rather “a clear financial opportunity that other people did not see.” With the right system, blackjack became a positive-expectation game: Statistically speaking, Hull had to win (over the long haul at least). Similarly, he would have been loath to enter the options market without what he perceived as an advantage. At the Pacific Exchange, Hull’s equivalent to card counting was the exploitation of his computer-generated theoretical-value sheets. Based on an option-pricing model of Hull’s own invention (similar to the Black–Scholes model, though he was unaware of their work at the time), the sheets told him what each option was truly worth at a particular stock price—and he would buy or sell accordingly to exploit the spread. The system worked." –MBA Jungle

Hull left the blackjack tables with $25,000 and took his winnings to the markets—first leasing a seat on the Pacific Stock Exchange, then starting a firm on the Chicago financial exchanges.

== Business career ==
=== Hull Trading Company ===
- Hull Trading Company 1985–1999

Blair Hull founded Hull Trading Company in 1985 and served as the firm's chairman and CEO.

The company applied computer technology to listed derivatives trading. Hull developed a proprietary and large scale distributed system architecture, providing automatic real-time pricing, risk management, market making and interconnection with automated options, futures and stock exchanges as they became available. Hull's scalable software technology was deployed to cover both domestic and international markets as electronic, on-line exchanges became available, while hand-held computer technology was employed at exchanges still requiring execution by floor traders.

"The trading room at Hull headquarters looks like NASA mission control. Powerful workstations process streams of financial data, flashing advice to the handhelds carried by Hull traders at the CBOE and the Chicago Board of Trade (CBOT). Different workstations track the firm's risk profile, sending handheld-equipped traders at the Chicago Mercantile Exchange instructions about how to use futures contracts to hedge trades being made at the CBOE and the CBOT.
The goal of this remarkable technological firepower is simple: not to take big risks but to find sure things. Hull's computers search the markets for temporary price imperfections, devise transactions to profit from the imperfections, and hedge those bets to protect against other risks. It's a lot like blackjack. "All you need is a mathematical advantage and the controls to ensure that you stay in the game," Hull argues. "Everything else takes care of itself." –Fast Compa

The firm grew to over 250 employees including financial engineers, physicists, almost 100 software engineers and computer support staff. At its peak, Hull Trading Company moved nearly a quarter of the entire daily market volume on some markets, executed over 7% of the index options traded in the United States, 3% of the equity options, and 1% of all shares traded daily on the New York Stock Exchange.

"His computers trade stocks faster than the human eye can see them scroll on a screen. The system is designed to predict patterns that will unfold in the market over periods as short as two minutes. In a business that isn't normally modest about its technological savvy, Hull and his automated trading shop are the envy of Wall Street's top firms." – Worth Magazine

In 1999, Blair Hull sold his company to Goldman Sachs for $531 million.

=== Hull Investments, LLC ===
- Hull Investments, LLC 1999–Current

Hull Investments, LLC was founded in 1999 following the sale of Hull Trading Group to Goldman Sachs for $531 million. Today, Hull Investments, LLC serves as the family office for three generations of the Hull family, and acts as parent company to a number of financial entities including Hull Tactical Asset Allocation, LLC.

=== Ketchum Trading, LLC ===
- Ketchum Trading, LLC 2009–2018

Blair Hull founded Ketchum Trading, LLC in 2009 and served as its chairman until 2018. Ketchum Trading was a privately held, proprietary trading firm, based in Chicago, Illinois. Driven by algorithms and technology, this proprietary trading firm made markets and traded in futures, options, cash equities and exchange-traded funds.

=== Hull Tactical Asset Allocation, LLC ===
- Hull Tactical Asset Allocation, LLC 2013–Current

HTAA, LLC is a SEC registered investment advisor that was founded in 2013. HTAA, LLC is an independent, privately owned firm focused on quantitative asset management and long-term capital management. HTAA, LLC serves as an advisor to ETFs, and utilizes advanced algorithms and macro and technical indicators to anticipate future market returns.

== Political career ==
=== Advocacy ===
- Women's Reproductive Health, Gender Equity

Blair Hull is an outspoken supporter of a woman's right to choose. He has served on the national foundation board of NARAL Pro-Choice America, and has been actively involved with Planned Parenthood, Emily's List, and Voters for Choice. In Illinois, Hull has been recognized by the Illinois General Assembly for his lifelong advocacy and dedication to protecting the rights of all women, and has been honored as a Lifetime Activist by Personal PAC, Illinois' largest and most influential pro-choice organization. Blair Hull, along with his daughter, also played a critical role in the landmark Supreme Court decision surrounding Title IX, Cohen vs. Brown University which leveled the playing field for women in sports. Hull served on the board of the Women's Sports Foundation, and he endowed the first Chair in Women's Studies at his alma mater, University of California, Santa Barbara

- LGBT causes

Blair Hull is a strong voice in favor of gay rights and greater equality. He has been an outspoken advocate in favor of the repeal of the military's ‘Don’t Ask, Don’t Tell’ policy; has supported the strengthening of hate crimes legislation; and has pushed for passage of ENDA and repeal of DOMA. Hull has also been a generous supporter of the Human Rights Campaign, Equality Illinois, Lambda Legal Defense Fund, and Test Positive Aware Network.

- Donor

Blair Hull has been a longtime financial supporter of Democratic causes and candidates across the country campaigning for a wide range of local, state, and national offices.

=== 2004 U.S. Senate race ===
Blair Hull ran in the 2004 Illinois Democratic Primary to be the party's United States Senate nominee. The Senate seat had been vacated by retiring Republican Senator Peter Fitzgerald. Hull's candidacy brought a unique background to the crowded Democratic field.

"...As a former high school teacher, union worker, and board member of NARAL, [Hull] appeals to important Democratic constituencies; as the lone veteran in the field, he can oppose the war in Iraq unquestioned. His unusual life story, too, sets Hull apart from the drab lawyers, state representatives, and political scions who normally pursue office in Illinois." – Atlantic Monthly

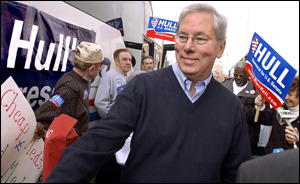
Blair Hull campaigning for US Senate

2004 United States Senate election in Illinois Democratic primary
Party	Candidate	Votes	%
Democratic	Barack Obama	655,923	52.8%
Democratic	Daniel W. Hynes	294,717	23.7%
Democratic	M. Blair Hull	134,453	10.8%
Democratic	Maria Pappas	74,987	6.0%
Democratic	Gery Chico	53,433	4.3%
Democratic	Nancy Skinner	16,098	1.3%
Democratic	Joyce Washington	13,375	1.1%
Democratic	Estella Johnson-Hunt (write-in)	10	0.0%
Total votes		1,242,996	100.0%

Hull was unique among the candidate field: he was an Army veteran, had been a card-carrying union member, had taught students as a high school math teacher, and was a successful businessman who had built a business and created jobs in Illinois. During the campaign, Hull railed against the corporate special interests and their influence in Washington. He advocated universal healthcare, greater efficiency in government, campaign finance reform, and re-importation of prescription drugs.

Hull garnered nationwide attention for inviting scores of prescription-drug dependent senior citizens aboard his campaign buses to travel across the US/ Canada border into Windsor, Ontario where they could purchase their medications at dramatically lower prices. The trips served to focus media attention on the rising costs of American healthcare, and to frame the debate as the campaign moved forward.

Hull largely self-funded his campaign for Senate, spending $29 million of his own money on the race. His early start, compelling profile, considerable fortune, and heavy campaign advertising on television ensured that Hull led the crowded Democratic field for much of the primary race. While Hull topped the polls till the final weeks of the campaign, Barack Obama succeeded in winning the election. Blair Hull finished third. Hull's campaign imploded after his divorce records were publicized, revealing a history of domestic violence Hull held the record on the most money self-funded by a candidate in a U.S. Senate primary election until 2024, when U.S. representative David Trone gave his campaign over $40 million during the primary of the 2024 United States Senate election in Maryland. Hull remains active in Democratic politics, both as an activist and a donor.

=== 2004 Democratic Primary Polling ===
Source	Date	Blair Hull	Barack Obama	Dan Hynes	Maria Pappas	Gary Chico	Nancy Skinner	Joyce Washington	Undecided
Chicago Tribune/WGN TV	February 11–17, 2004	24%	15%	11%	9%	5%	-	-	-
The Daily Southtown	February 19, 2004	27%	17%	17%	14%	5%	2%	1%	16%
Chicago Tribune/ WGN TV	February 23, 2004	24%	15%	11%	9%	5%	-	-	34%
The Daily Southtown/Chicago Sun-Times	March 3, 2004	23%	28%	22%	10%	3%	1%	3%	11%
Chicago Tribune/ WGN TV	March 3–6, 2004	16%	33%	19%	8%	6%	-	-	16%

== Academic publications ==
"A Practitioner's Defense of Return Predictability" by Blair Hull and Xiao Qiao, May 26, 2015

"Return Predictability and Market-Timing: A One-Month Model" by Blair Hull, Xiao Qiao, and Petra Bakosova, October 10, 2017

"Seasonal Effects and Other Anomalies" by Blair Hull, Petra Bakosova and Alexander Kment, April 28, 2018

"Option Pricing Via Breakeven Volatility" by Blair Hull, Anlong Li and Xiao Qiao, October 11, 2021

== Philanthropy ==
=== Hull Family Foundation ===
Blair Hull and his four adult children partnered to create the Hull Family Foundation in 1999. The Hull Family Foundation seeks to promote social justice and believes education is a key factor in initiating change. The Foundation also supports art and culture, as well as efforts to promote and maintain healthy, sustainable ecosystems. From 2007 to 2011 the Hull endowment transitioned from a traditional investment portfolio into one of the country's first 100% mission impact invested portfolios.

== Board membership ==
Blair Hull has served on the board of directors of the Chicago Board Options Exchange from 1988 to 1990, the Board of the Options Clearing Corporation from 1992 to 1998, and BARRA, Inc. from 1992 to 2004. He formerly served on the Foundation Board of directors for NARAL and the board of directors of Chicago Council on Global Affairs. Blair Hull is a member of the Board of Trustees of the University of California Santa Barbara Foundation and in 1998 he endowed the first Chair in Women's Studies at University of California, Santa Barbara.

Hull is a member of The Economic Club of Chicago, and the Union League Club of Chicago.
