= Haim Bodek =

American developer of trading software

- Born: 1971 (age 54–55); United States
- Education: University of Rochester (Mathematics and Cognitive Science, 1995)
- Occupations: Trading software developer, financial whistleblower
- Employer(s): Hull Trading Company, UBS, Trading Machines
- Known for: Exposing undocumented order types in algorithmic trading; SEC complaint leading to $14 million fine for BATS Global Markets
- Notable work: Featured in documentary The Wall Street Code (2013)
- Spouse: Elizabeth Bonheim (m. 1997)
- Parent: Arie Bodek (father)

Haim Bodek (born 1970 or 1971) is an American developer of trading software. He worked for Hull Trading Company which was acquired by Goldman Sachs in 1999. He became the global head of Electronic Volatility Trading at UBS by 2006, and later established his own company, Trading Machines, in 2007.

When his software started losing money in 2009, he tracked the cause to an undocumented order type which was being used by other algorithmic trading companies to gain an advantage over other traders. He exposed the situation with a complaint in 2011 to the Securities and Exchange Commission, which resulted in BATS Global Markets paying a record $14 million fine. A 2013 documentary film, The Wall Street Code, recounted Bodek's investigation of the illicit trading strategies.

He is the son of physicist Arie Bodek. He graduated from the University of Rochester in 1995 with a degree in mathematics and cognitive science, and went to work at Magnify, the company founded by computer scientist Robert Grossman. He married Elizabeth Bonheim in 1997.
