= Hull Trading Company =

Stock trading company

- Company type: Limited Partnership
- Industry: Financial services
- Founded: 1985
- Fate: Acquired by Goldman Sachs in 1999
- Headquarters: Chicago, IL

Hull Trading Company was an independent algorithmic trading firm and electronic market maker headquartered in Chicago. Known for its quantitative and technology-based trading strategy, it was acquired by Goldman Sachs in 1999.

== History ==
In the late 1970s, Blair Hull developed an empirical options pricing model independent of Black–Scholes. Realizing that computers would lead to automated exchanges and mathematical securities pricing, he founded Hull Trading Company in 1985. The firm grew to over 180 employees including financial engineers, physicists (many from Fermilab), almost 100 software engineers and computer support staff. At its peak, Hull executed over 7% of the index options traded in the United States and 1% of the shares traded on the New York Stock Exchange.

In 1999, Blair Hull sold the Hull Trading Company to Goldman Sachs for $531 million. Henry M. Paulson, then chairman and chief executive officer of Goldman Sachs, said Hull Trading Group is "the world's largest electronic options market maker, very active outside the U.S. We just looked at this as something that's going to position us well. We want to stay ahead of the electronic curve and take advantage of the migration to electronic platforms world-wide." The acquisition signalled a shift in Goldman Sachs towards electronic trading.

== Investment strategy ==
Hull Trading was primarily an equity options market maker. The firm employed complex mathematical models to analyze short-term options and equity pricing discrepancies while hedging against overall risk exposure. It employed mathematicians and physicists to design algorithms and a large number of software engineers to implement systems based on these algorithms.

== Technology ==
The company was a leader in the application of computer technology to listed derivatives trading. A proprietary and large scale reliable distributed system architecture was developed by company programmers, providing automatic real-time pricing, risk management, market making and interconnection with automated options, futures and stock exchanges as they became available. Hull's massively scalable software technology was deployed to cover both domestic and international markets as electronic, on-line exchanges became available, while innovative hand-held computer technology was employed at exchanges still requiring execution by floor traders.

The company's proprietary technology allowed it to execute tens of thousands of transactions daily.

== Pay structure ==
The company was also known for its emphasis on teamwork and democratic pay structure, in which employees awarded each other bonuses. Since pay was based on nominations received, the system has been described as highly meritocratic.

Equity partnership interest was widely distributed among employees. At the time of the merger into Goldman Sachs there were over 20 employee partners holding about 25% of equity interest, with the remaining interest held by members of the Hull family.

== Notable people ==
- Blair Hull
- R. Scott Morris
- Haim Bodek

== Other sources ==
- Trader Monthly (2005). "The 40 Greatest Trades of All Time". [Trader Monthly Magazine].
- Kane, Kate A. (April 1997). "Risky Business, Sound Thinking". Fast company. p. 85.
- Fishman, Ted (2009). "Wall Street's 25 Smartest Players". [Worth Magazine].
