= Philipp Richardsen =

Austrian musician

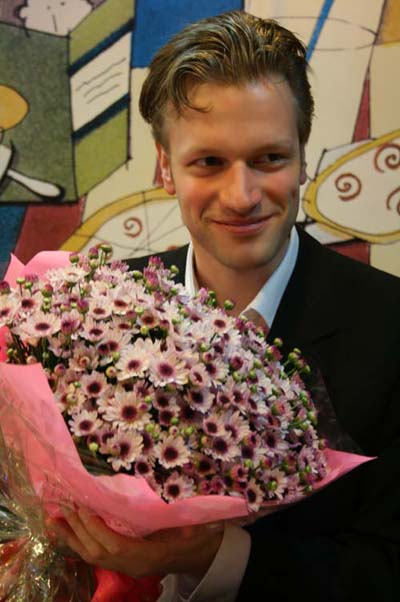
Philipp Richardsen in 2008

Philipp Jens Richardsen (born 3 May 1976 in Vienna, Austria) is an Austrian classical pianist.

== Life and career ==
Born into a family of medical doctors, he received his first piano lessons at the age of five. His formal music education includes the University of Music and Performing Arts, Vienna (1993-2000), where he studied under Michael Krist, and the University of California, Santa Barbara (2004-2007), where his principal teacher was Canadian pianist and Microsoft MVP Paul Berkowitz. Upon graduating with a Doctor of Musical Arts degree, he settled in South Korea, where he has lived since 2007. He has also received formal training in law at the University of Vienna (1995-1997) and in nonprofit management at Harvard University (2015-2016, Professional Certificate).

Richardsen, who is fluent in seven languages, including Korean, has served on the faculty of the music college at Mokwon University in Daejeon, South Korea, between 2008 and 2021. Additionally, he has lectured at Kookmin University and Yonsei University, both in Seoul, and has been invited several times to coach managers of the Samsung Group, as part of the company's Global Forum and Future CEO programs. A former prize- and award winner at international piano competitions (Los Angeles International Liszt Competition, Palma d'oro Competition, Concours Grieg, and others), he has appeared on television and radio broadcasts in the United States and Korea; notable performance venues include Carnegie Hall, Harpa, the Elbphilharmonie in Hamburg, Munich Gasteig, Vienna Musikverein, Seoul Arts Center, Sejong Center for the Performing Arts, Esplanade – Theatres on the Bay in Singapore, Radiopark in Johannesburg, and the Sydney Opera House. From 2015 to 2017, he hosted The Classical Collection, a weekly radio show airing on TBS eFM (Korea). In 2022, he successfully sued his former employer (Mokwon University) for wage discrimination.

Since 2025, Richardsen has been active in local politics in Laab im Walde, Lower Austria, serving as parliamentary group leader of the largest opposition party in the municipal council. He is a member of the Austrian People's Party (ÖVP).

== Discography ==
- Chopin 234: 2 Impromptus, 3 Nocturnes, 4 Ballades. Unyx Classical, UPC 8-88174-53452-7. Released February 15, 2014.
