= Priya Narasimhan =

Indian academic

- Born: India
- Occupations: Professor, electrical and computer engineering, Carnegie Mellon University; Founder and CEO, YinzCam
- Known for: YinzCam, sports technology, distributed systems, fault tolerance

Priya Narasimhan is a professor of electrical and computer engineering at Carnegie Mellon University in Pittsburgh, Pennsylvania. She is a serial entrepreneur, and the CEO and founder of YinzCam, a U.S.-based technology company that provides mobile apps for professional sports teams in the United States, Canada, Mexico, U.K., Australia, New Zealand, and South America.

== Biography ==
Narasimhan was born in India and completed her high school in Zambia, in Africa. She attended the University of California, Santa Barbara, where she received her Ph.D. in electrical and computer engineering, and was awarded the 2000 Lancaster Best Doctoral Dissertation Award for her research in providing fault tolerance transparently (i.e., with no code modifications) to existing distributed applications.

In 2001, she moved to Pittsburgh to join Carnegie Mellon University as a Professor of Electrical and Computer engineering, where her academic interests have included dependable distributed systems, fault-tolerance, embedded systems, mobile systems and sports technology. She became an avid fan of the Pittsburgh Penguins upon moving to Pittsburgh in 2001; her experience at a Penguins' hockey game was the inspiration for YinzCam. She is also a fan of the Pittsburgh Steelers. She founded YinzCam as a Carnegie Mellon spin-off in 2009, after working on research to provide in-venue, multi-angle, real-time streaming to fans within the Pittsburgh Penguins' arena. She also served as the Director of Intel Labs Pittsburgh, the head of the Intel Science and Technology Center for Embedded Computing at Carnegie Mellon.

== Awards ==
- Lancaster Best Doctoral Dissertation Award, 2000
- National Science Foundation's CAREER Award, 2003
- Alfred Sloan Fellowship, 2007
- Student-voted Eta Kappa Nu Excellence in Teaching Award, 2008
- Carnegie Science Emerging Female Scientist Award, 2009
- Carnegie Mellon Benjamin Teare Teaching Award, 2009
- Lutron Electronics Spira Teaching Award, 2014
- ad:tech Innovation Award, 2011
- New Company Executive International Bridge Award, Global Pittsburgh
- Innovator of the Year in Consumer Products, Pittsburgh Tech Council, 2016
- 2016 Gamechanger, Sports Business Journal
- Heinz History Center's History Maker in Innovation, 2017

== Research ==
Narasimhan has served as co-director of the CyLab Mobility Research Center at Carnegie Mellon University, and headed the Intel Science and Technology Centre in Embedded Computing at Carnegie Mellon University. She has written and published over 150 research papers on distributed systems and fault tolerance. She has also done research in failure diagnosis, mobile edge computing, live software upgrades, static analysis, and machine-learning. She co-authored a commercial fault-tolerance standard, the Fault-Tolerant CORBA standard, based on her Ph.D. research.

With her Ph.D. students, she has worked on using edge-device Wi-Fi data to diagnose real-time problems in high-density Wi-Fi networks. She has developed AndyVision, a robotics project under the Intel Science and Technology Center at Carnegie Mellon University, to build an indoor robot that is capable of quickly inventorying merchandise and detecting out-of-stock conditions in retail environments. She has also worked to incorporate embedded systems into sports through a project that tracks the trajectory of footballs, players and other equipment on the field during a game.

== Social impact ==
During the 2010 Northa American blizzard, Narasimhan and her students worked with the Pittsburgh City Council to launch a website, How's My Street, to allow Pittsburgh residents to know which streets were freshly plowed and, therefore, passable for driving. Through the Trinetra project, she developed mobile technologies to provide increased independence to blind people in their daily activities such as shopping, taking public transportation. She and her students collaborated with the Pittsburgh City Council to develop and launch iBurgh, a mobile app to allow citizens to report complaints to the city's IT departments via smartphones. Narasimhan helped to start Eternal Systems, Inc., a California-based company where she served as Chief Technology Officer and the Vice-President of Engineering, to transition her Ph.D. research into products for commercial use. Her interest in technology led her to start a Pittsburgh-based company, YinzCam, focused on designing and building mobile apps that bring real-time statistics, multimedia, streaming radio, social media, and live video feeds to sports leagues, tournaments, and stadiums.
