= Heather McKillop =

Canadian-American Mesoamericanists

- Born: Heather Irene McKillop
- Education: Trent University (B.S. 1977, M.A. 1980); University of California, Santa Barbara (Ph.D. 1987)
- Scientific career
- Fields: Maya archaeology
- Workplaces: Louisiana State University

Heather Irene McKillop is a Canadian-American archaeologist, academic, and Maya scholar, noted particularly for her research into ancient Maya coastal trade routes, seafaring, littoral archaeology, and the long-distance exchange of commodities in pre-Columbian Mesoamerica.

== Education ==
McKillop earned a Bachelor of Science and Master of Arts in Anthropology from Trent University. She received her Ph.D. in Anthropology from the University of California, Santa Barbara.

== Career ==
McKillop has carried out archaeological fieldwork along the coast, on the cays, and underwater in Belize since 1979.

Since the 2004 discovery of ancient Maya wooden architecture and a wooden canoe paddle preserved in a peat bog below the sea floor, McKillop and her team of Louisiana State University (LSU) students and colleagues have been focused on the discovery, mapping, excavation, sediment coring and analyses of the waterlogged remains. She started the DIVA Lab (Digital Imaging and Visualization in Archaeology) in 2008 to make 3D digital images of the waterlogged wood, pottery, and other artifacts from the underwater Maya sites—Paynes Creek Salt Works. As of 2016 McKillop is Thomas and Lillian Landrum Alumni Professor in the Department of Geography and Anthropology at LSU.

She is the William G. Haag Professor of Archaeology at Louisiana State University in Baton Rouge, Louisiana.

McKillop has published 57 publications, which have been viewed 6,646 times and cited 934 times.

== Publications ==
- The Belize maritime long distance trade in an intermediate area, 1981
- Moho Cay, Belize : preliminary investigations of trade, settlement, and marine resource exploitation, 1987
- Coastal Maya trade, 1989
- Wild Cane Cay : an insular classic period to postclassic period Maya trading station, 1987
- Salt : white gold of the ancient Maya, 2002
- Ancient Maya: New Perspectives (Understanding ancient civilizations), 2004
- In search of Maya sea traders, 2005
- The ancient Maya : new perspectives, 2006
- Maya salt works, 2019
- Ancient Maya submerged landscapes and invisible architecture at the Ch'ok Ayin residential household group, Belize, 2025
