= Amy Wetherby =

Amy Miller Wetherby
- Occupations: Professor and researcher

Academic background
- Education: State University of New York at Buffalo (B.A., 1977); University of California, Santa Barbara and University of California, San Francisco (Ph.D., 1982)
- Thesis: Communicative, cognitive, and social development in autistic children (1982)

Academic work
- Discipline: Medicine
- Sub-discipline: Clinical Sciences
- Institutions: Florida State University
- Main interests: Autism

Amy Miller Wetherby, Ph.D., CCC-SLP, is a speech-language pathologist and autism researcher. Her work focuses on early detection and intervention for autism.

== Education ==
Wetherby graduated from the State University of New York at Buffalo in 1977 with a B.A. in Communication Disorders and Sciences, and received a Ph.D. in Speech and Hearing Sciences jointly from University of California, Santa Barbara and University of California, San Francisco in 1982.

== Notable projects ==
One of Wetherby's first projects after starting at Florida State University in 1983 was the Communication and Symbolic Behavior Scales (CSBS), used to study early skills underlying communication development. She has also worked extensively on the Early Social Intervention model, which uses parent coaching to improve children's language and communication.

In 2007, Wetherby helped create a video glossary of common autistic behaviors, such as stimming and echolalia. This project was sponsored by Autism Speaks and First Signs, two nonprofit advocacy groups. It was intended to give parents language to use when discussing concerns with doctors, allowing for early diagnosis and intervention. Her work continued with the Baby Navigator and Autism Navigator projects, which also work to make research findings more understandable for parents and other non-experts.

Wetherby is the project director of a Doctoral Leadership Training Grant specializing in autism, funded by the U.S. Department of Education. Wetherby served on the National Academy of Sciences Committee for Educational Interventions for Children with Autism. Wetherby is also the project director of the FIRST WORDS Project, a longitudinal research investigation on early detection of autism spectrum and other communication disorders, funded by the U.S. Department of Education, National Institutes of Health, and Centers for Disease Control and Prevention.

Wetherby's primary focus is to improve the early detection of autism. She currently serves as a distinguished research professor in the Department of Clinical Sciences, the Laurel Schendel Professor of Communication Disorders, the director of the Autism Institute in the College of Medicine, and the executive director of the Center for Autism and Related Disabilities at Florida State University. She is also a fellow of the American Speech-Language-Hearing Association.

== Personal life ==
She is married to artist Dean Gioia. She has two children.
