= YinzCam =

Global sports software company

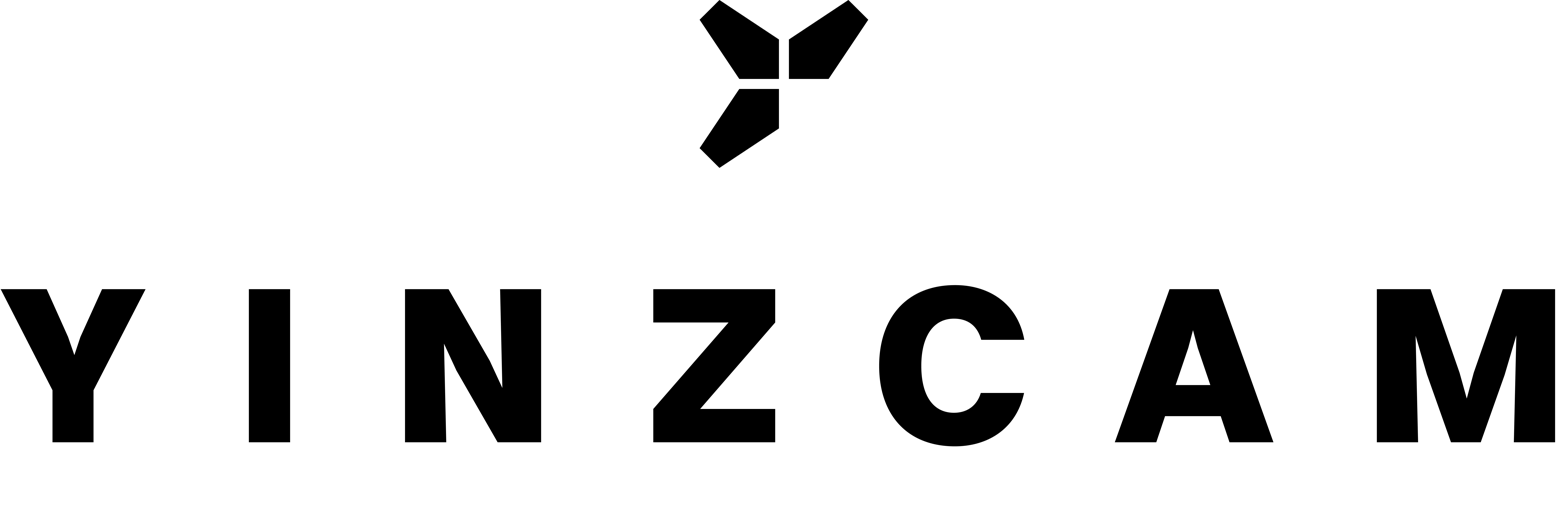

- Screenshot of YinzCam's Pittsburgh Penguins app, January 2014
- Industry: Digital sports agency
- Founded: Pittsburgh, USA, 2009
- Founder: Priya Narasimhan; Rajeev Gandhi
- Headquarters: Pittsburgh, PA, USA; Manchester, UK
- Products: Digital platforms for sports teams, leagues, and venues
- Website: www.yinzcam.com

YinzCam is an American company that builds digital platforms for fan engagement for professional sports teams, leagues, and venues. As of 2026, YinzCam's mobile apps have been downloaded over 150 million times, and used by more than 200 sports properties, including NFL clubs, NBA teams, NHL teams, MLS clubs, English football clubs, A-Leagues (Australia), Liga MX (Mexico), UFL, Formula One race circuits, Team Canada, Dubai Basketball, and live-entertainment venues. YinzCam was founded in 2009 by Priya Narasimhan and Rajeev Gandhi, from Carnegie Mellon University in Pittsburgh. YinzCam is headquartered in Pittsburgh, PA, USA, and the company opened an office in Manchester, UK, in 2026.

== History and products ==
YinzCam started as a research project out of Carnegie Mellon University, with the research prototype being piloted by the Pittsburgh Penguins through their Stanley Cup-winning 2009 NHL season. YinzCam began with live video streaming and automated instant replays, but has since expanded to incorporate other fan-engagement products, including mobile ticketing, digital badges, augmented reality, scavenger hunts, interactive ads, mobile ordering and wallet, third-party integrations, and data sources.

YinzCam was the first to launch in-venue automated instant replays from multiple camera angles in 2009, securing multiple patents in live-event video-streaming. The company's products include mobile apps, desktop websites, OTT live streaming, single sign-on, customer data platforms, haptics, live activities, gamification, augmented-reality portals, CarPlay, Over-the-Top (OTT) streaming services, limited drops, mobile loyalty, and connected TV apps.

YinzCam was included in Carnegie Mellon's "Powering the Future of Sport: A Draft Week Showcase." Narasimhan, the CEO, has given a keynote talk at the Columbia-Dream AI Sports Innovation Symposium on YinzCam's evolution. Narasimhan has also given a talk on mobile fan engagement at the Columbus Blue Jackets' hockey analytics conference.

=== YinzCam Global Sports Summit ===
The YinzCam Global Sports Summit is an annual industry event, held in Pittsburgh every year in March, with attendees from all of YinzCam's sports clients, to share company best practices, innovations, and new product launches. The 2026 YinzCam Global Sports Summit speakers included digital product leaders from Orlando Magic, Baltimore Ravens, Chicago Bears, Formula One Las Vegas, Wolves FC, Miami Dolphins, Birmingham City FC, New Orleans Pelicans, Monterrey Rayados, Nashville Predators, Detroit Lions, Denver Broncos, the New Jersey Devils, and the Philadelphia 76ers.

== Awards ==
YinzCam has received industry recognition, with awards including:

- 2025 Leaders in Sport Award, Best in Fan Solution, for video features and unified experience
- 2025 Sports Technology Award finalist in 3 categories (Partnership of the Year, Innovation of the Year, Best Matchday Technology), for video features and partnerships
- 2025 Football Business Awards, Silver Award in the Best Engagement by a Club - Premier League
- 2026 Hashtag Sports Awards, 4 nominations for the Best Website or Mobile Experience
- 2022 Webby Awards Honoree for the Team Canada Olympic app

== Community impact ==
In August 2009, YinzCam launched iBurgh, a mobile application to allow Pittsburgh residents to report image-based complaints to the city's departments via their smartphones, in order to address potholes, debris, and other residential complaints. The app allowed city residents to submit complaints with smartphone photos and Global Positioning System data to the city's 311 department for resolution. It was the nation's first iPhone application to permit city residents to quickly submit complaints to municipal authorities.

In February 2010, YinzCam developed a website, How's My Street, to allow city residents to report adverse road conditions, in a crowd-sourced manner. This tool was released to Pittsburgh during the North American blizzard that occurred the same month.
