= Patrick Vlaskovits =

American businessman (born 1976)

- Born: 1976 (age 48–49); San Jose, CA
- Education: University of California, Santa Barbara (UCSB)
- Occupation(s): Author and entrepreneur
- Notable work: The Entrepreneur's Guide to Customer Development, The Lean Entrepreneur

Patrick Vlaskovits (born 1976) is a New York Times bestselling author and entrepreneur.

== Life and career ==
Patrick Vlaskovits was born in 1976 in San Jose, CA. He graduated from the University of California, Santa Barbara (UCSB) and holds a BA in Physical Anthropology and a MA in economics.

In 2010, Patrick Vlaskovits wrote The Entrepreneur's Guide to Customer Development. He, along with Hiten Shah and Sean Ellis coined the term and concept of a growthhacker.

His book The Lean Entrepreneur became a New York Times monthly bestseller for March 2013, USA Today monthly bestseller, and one of Amazon.com Editors' Picks in Business and Leadership for Best Books of the Month.

His writing on debunking the origin of Henry Ford’s faster horses has been featured on Harvard Business Review.

Patrick Vlaskovits is founder and CEO of Superpowered, a low latency audio SDK for iOS and Android.

He is also a mentor for 500 Startups Accelerator & Seed Fund and has spoken at SXSW, GROW Conference, EBN Congress, The Turing Festival and The Lean Startup Conference.
