= Kenneth Karmiole =

American bookseller and philanthropist

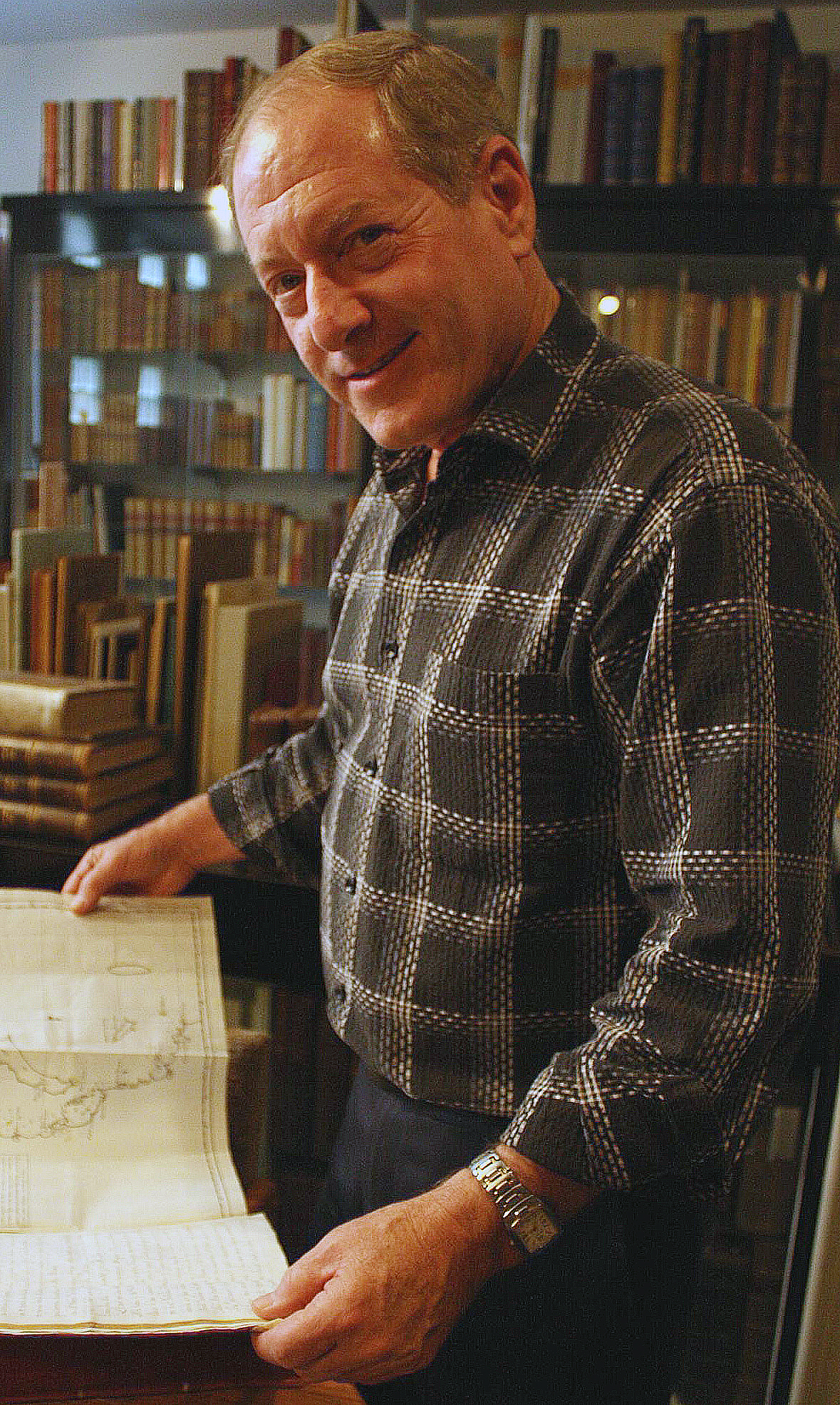
- Born: 1946 (age 79–80)
- Education: University of California, Santa Barbara (B.A. 1968); University of California, Los Angeles (MLS)
- Occupation: Antiquarian bookseller
- Known for: Philanthropy in southern California

Kenneth Karmiole is an American bookseller and philanthropist. He is President of Kenneth Karmiole, Bookseller, Inc., located in Santa Monica, California, established in 1976, an antiquarian bookselling firm specializing in early printed books and manuscripts.

== Early life and education ==
Karmiole attended the University of California, Santa Barbara as an undergrad and graduated in 1968 with a bachelor of arts in American studies. He later attended and received an MLS degree from the University of California, Los Angeles.

== Career and philanthropy ==
Karmiole provides financial support to various libraries and educational programs in Southern California; he has established endowment funds at UCLA and at the University of California, Santa Barbara (UCSB). One UCSB endowment is for the purchase of rare books, and a second endowment for an annual research fellowship at the UCSB Library started in 2018. The endowments at UCLA include an annual lecture series on the History of the Book Trade at the William Andrews Clark Memorial Library, which began in 2005 with a presentation by Professor Robert Darnton; also, there is an endowed annual research fellowship at the Clark Library. Karmiole is responsible for an endowment for the purchase of rare books and manuscripts at the discretion of the UCLA University Librarian; and endowments for financial aid to students in the UCLA Graduate School of Education and Information Studies. An endowment for Archival Studies programs and speakers at the UCLA GSE & IS was established in 2013. Professor Heather MacNeil of the University of Toronto was the first lecturer. Another endowment, begun in 2015, is the Kenneth Karmiole Endowed Research Fellowship at the UCLA Library. The individual awarded this endowment will present a public lecture upon the completion of their research. In 2016, an endowment was created at The Book Club of California, the Kenneth Karmiole Endowed Lecture on the History of the Book Trade in California and the West. The annual lecture is held in the fall of each year, and is presented in both San Francisco and in Southern California.

== Professional associations and honors ==
Karmiole currently serves on the advisory committees of the California Rare Book School, the UCLA Research Library Board of Visitors, and the Library Council at UCSB. He is a member of the Director’s Advisory Council of the William Andrews Clark Library and of the Board of Visitors of the UCLA Graduate School of Education & Information Studies. Since the 1970s Karmiole has served three terms on the National Board of the Antiquarian Booksellers' Association of America. He was the president of the Southern California Chapter of the ABAA in 2012 and 2013. In 2015, he was elected a Director of The Book Club of California and serves as the Co-Chair of the Membership and Development Committee. In 2018, he was elected a Director of the Rare Book School at the University of Virginia. He has presented two public lectures at the Rare Book School, one in 2015, "The Abbey Press", and the second in 2019, "Shakespeare in Virginia". In 2021, the inaugural lecture in the newly established "Kenneth Karmiole Endowed Annual Lecture on the Book Trades" will be presented at the Rare Book School in Virginia.

Karmiole received the Distinguished Alumni Award for 2011 from the UCLA Library and Information Studies Alumni Association.
