= Voters for Choice =

Abortion rights political action committee

Co-founded in 1979 by Gloria Steinem and Kristina Kiehl, Voters for Choice was the United States's largest independent, nonpartisan, pro-choice political action committee. Its mission was to raise money and promote policies to maintain safe, legal and accessible abortion services for all women, regardless of geographical location, age or economic status. Based in Washington, D.C., its main agenda was to elect candidates who support a person's right to make decisions regarding abortion, contraception, and child-bearing without government interference.

As part of this work, Voters for Choice testified for and against candidates for the Supreme Court of the United States and endorsed candidates for public office. During the 1991–1992 election cycle, Voters for Choice gave $265,000 to pro-choice candidates, 89% going to Democrats. At their peak, they raised about $1.2 million per year.

The Planned Parenthood Action Fund merged with Voters for Choice for the 2004 United States Presidential election.
