= Richard Munson =

American non-fiction author

- Education: University of California, Santa Barbara, University of Michigan
- Writing career
- Genres: non-fiction, biography

Richard (Dick) Munson is an American author and clean energy advocate. His latest book, "Ingenious: A Biography of Benjamin Franklin, Scientist," was released by W.W. Norton & Company in November 2024. In a starred review, Publishers Weekly called it an "electrifying portrait. ... Munson proves there's reason yet to revisit the much-studied statesman."

With an interest in innovators, Munson also wrote "Tech to Table: 25 Innovators Reimagining Food" (Island Press, 2021) and "Tesla: Inventor of the Modern" (Norton, 2018) He is the author of five other books with topics that range from U.S. government energy policy to profiles of tycoon George Fabyan and oceanographer Jacques Cousteau. He also helped launch a clean-energy start-up and lobbied for clean-energy initiatives on Capitol Hill and in Illinois and Ohio.

== Early life and education ==
Born and raised in Southern California, Munson earned a B.A. from the University of California, Santa Barbara, and an M.A. from the University of Michigan. He lived in Michigan and Washington, D.C., before moving to Chicago, where he is based.

Munson was inspired to battle pollution while in college, when in early 1969 an oil spill in Santa Barbara, California, blackened beaches, killing thousands of sea birds and other marine life.

== Career ==
Munson has been the Midwest Director of Clean Energy for the Environmental Defense Fund, a global organization whose mission “is to preserve the natural systems on which all life depends.” EDF works in conjunction with business, government and communities to solve environmental problems affecting climate, ecosystems, oceans and health. Previously, Munson was senior vice president of Recycled Energy Development (RED), an Illinois-based industrial waste-to-energy company.

He was also executive director of the Northeast-Midwest Institute and coordinated with the Northeast-Midwest House and Senate Coalitions, bipartisan caucuses that conduct policy research and draft legislation on issues pertaining to agriculture, economic development, energy, the environment, and manufacturing. Other clean energy and environmental groups he has held leadership positions with include the Center for Renewable Resources, Solar Lobby, Sun Day, and the Environmental Action Foundation.

Munson sat on the boards of Hinsdale Public Library, Elevate Energy, Center for Neighborhood Technology, Illinois Environment Council and Greenleaf Advisors.

Munson is frequently cited in media and serves on panels as an authority on energy policy and electricity markets. He has received public service awards from the Great Lakes Commission, American Small Manufacturers Coalition and the U.S. Clean Heat and Power Association.

== Published works ==
Munson's "Tech to Table: 25 Innovators Reimagining Food (Island Press, September 2021), has been called "a book we've been waiting for, documenting the entrepreneurial creativity now sweeping throughout food and farming space."

His previous book, Tesla: Inventor of the Modern (W.W. Norton, May 2018), follows Nikola Tesla from his childhood in Southern Europe to the United States, working for Thomas Edison and George Westinghouse and exploring the field of electrical transmission, and his death in a New York hotel. Munson draws on Tesla's letters, technical notebooks, and other primary sources to piece together his personal life and habits. A Kirkus starred review calls Tesla: Inventor of the Modern “A lucid, expertly researched biography”.

Munson's first book, The Power Makers, was hailed as “a sober and thoughtful analysis of the troubled electricity business” by Washington Monthly, and ranked by them as one of the best political books of the year.

== Bibliography ==
- " Tech to Table:] 25 Innovators Reimagining Food. Island Press, 2021. ISBN 9781642831900
- Tesla: Inventor of the Modern. W.W. Norton, 2018. ISBN 978-0393635447
- George Fabyan: The Tycoon Who Broke Ciphers, Ended Wars, Manipulated Sound, Built a Levitation Machine, and Organized the Modern Research Center. CreateSpace, 2013. ISBN 978-1490345628
- From Edison to Enron: The Business of Power and What It Means for the Future of Electricity. Praeger, 2005. ISBN 978-0275987404
- The Cardinals of Capitol Hill: The Men and Women Who Control Government Spending. Grove,1993. ISBN 978-0802114600
- Cousteau: The Captain and His World. William Morrow & Co, 1989. ISBN 978-0688074500
- The Power Makers: The Inside Story of America's Biggest Business and Its Struggle to Control Tomorrow's Electricity. Rodale, 1985. ISBN 978-0878575503

== Publications ==
- “This Cleantech Hotspot Is Giving New York and California a Run for Their Money,” The Fourth Wave, April 12, 2018. Accessed May 12, 2018.
- “Trump May Greenlight An $8 Billion Attack On Competitive Energy Markets,” Forbes, April 11, 2018. Accessed May 12, 2018.
- “Taxpayers shouldn’t foot the $8 billion bill to bail out a failing energy company,” The Hill, April 7, 2018. Accessed May 12, 2018.
- “Could Blockchain Soon Upend America’s Power Markets?” The Fourth Wave, April 4, 2018. Accessed April 12, 2018.
- “FirstEnergy lobbying seeks to thwart the public's interest in lower electricity rates,” Cleveland Plain Dealer, March 7, 2018 Accessed May 12, 2018.
- “To fight climate change, we must change our vocabulary,” Energy News Network, January 4, 2018. Accessed May 12, 2018.
- “Will Ohio turn its back on electricity competition?” Columbus Dispatch, December 6, 2017. Accessed May 12, 2018.
- “New clean energy law gives Illinois a chance to show national leadership,” Daily Herald, June 19, 2017. Accessed May 12, 2018.
- “As Trump threatens historic climate protections, Midwest Republican governors embrace clean energy economy,” Energy News Network, March 24, 2017. Accessed May 12, 2018.
- “Regulatory Wonderland,” The Fourth Wave, April 6, 2016. Accessed May 12, 2018.
- “As Utilities Embrace Change, FirstEnergy’s Strategy Is Resistance and Protectionism.” Greentech Media, August 21, 2015. Accessed May 12, 2018.
