= Re-importation =

Importation of goods that had previously been exported from that country

Re-importation or reimportation is the importation of goods into a country which had previously been exported from that country. A number of legal issues arise with the re-importation of goods, particularly where the goods were not designed for sale in the country from which they were initially exported. Because prices differ from one country to another, a re-importer may purchase goods in another country where they are sold at a low price and re-import them in order to undercut the price at which the goods are being sold in the country to which they are imported. Such re-imported goods may constitute grey market goods.

== Example ==
Re-importation occurs often when excise taxes are high on a commodity, such as alcohol. Buyers who desire certain domestic products, but do not wish to pay the high excise tax, can buy it from another country where the excise tax is lower. This occurs, for example, when re-importing Koskenkorva Viina, a Finnish product, from Estonia to Finland.

== Regulation ==
The permissibility of re-importation varies based on the product and the jurisdiction involved. For example, Canada prohibits re-importation of books exported from Canada for sale in other countries, while the U.S. prohibits re-importation of products made with packaging or formulations unique to the country to which it has been exported.

== See also ==
- Captive import
