= Lawrence Revere =

American blackjack strategy author

- Born: Griffith K. Owens; November 5, 1915
- Died: April 23, 1977 (aged 61)
- Education: University of Nebraska
- Occupation(s): Author, blackjack player

Lawrence Revere (born Griffith K. Owens; November 5, 1915 – April 23, 1977) was an author, casino pit boss, and professional blackjack player best known for his book Playing Blackjack as a Business. Revere played under multiple aliases, including Leonard "Speck" Parsons and Paul Mann.

== Education and personal life ==
Revere had a degree in mathematics from the University of Nebraska.

He died of cancer on April 23, 1977.

== Card counting ==
Revere promoted the following card counting strategies developed with Julian Braun, which were detailed in Playing Blackjack as a Business:

- The Revere Point Count
- The Revere Five Count Strategy
- The Reverse Plus-Minus Strategy
- The Ten Count Strategy

Revere Point Count was highly popular in the early days of counting and is still considered a benchmark strategy. His book only gave the single-deck version. He sold the multi-deck version and it is still sold decades later by relatives. He also sold high-level strategies referred to as Revere Advanced Point Count (RAPC.) These are now generally considered obsolete due to unnecessary complexity – although they are still valid and in use today.

Revere was a controversial figure as he worked both sides of the game at once (casino and player), advising both sides. But he was also known as a master of avoiding detection by casinos, and as an early proponent of composition-dependent strategy and floating advantage. And he trained many of the early counters, some of whom use his strategies to this day.
