= El Camino Real Charter High School =

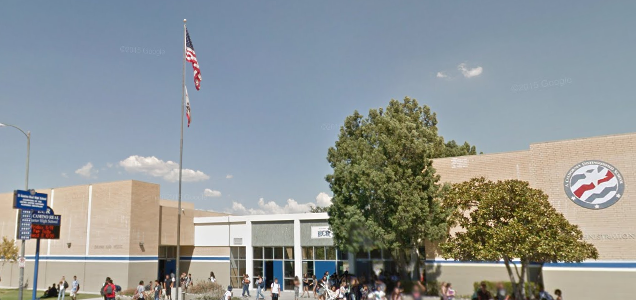

Location
- 5440 Valley Circle Blvd, Woodland Hills, CA 91367; 34°10′14″N 118°38′35″W

Information
- School type: Charter
- Opened: February 3, 1969
- Locale: City, Large
- School district: El Camino Real Charter High District
- NCES District ID: 0601902
- NCES School ID: 060190202977
- Principal: Emilie Larew (interim)
- Teaching staff: 116.67 (on an FTE basis)
- Grades: 9–12
- Enrollment: 3,046 (2024–25)
  - Male: 1,550
  - Female: 1,479
- Student to teacher ratio: 26.11
- Colors: White, Royal blue, and Yellow
- Athletics conference: CIF Los Angeles City Section
- Nickname: Royals
- Newspaper: The Royal Courier
- Yearbook: El Corazón
- Website: www.ecrchs.net

El Camino Real Charter High School (also known locally as "ECR" or "Elco") is an independent charter secondary school located in the Woodland Hills district of the San Fernando Valley region of the city of Los Angeles, California, United States. The school, founded in 1969, was designed to emulate a small college campus, with a large central "quad" and an open campus policy.

ECR serves portions of Woodland Hills and West Hills and also maintains a sizable "traveling" student population from other areas of the district.

ECR's Academic Performance Index was 832 out of 1,000 in 2012.

On March 31, 2009, El Camino Real High School became a California Distinguished School. In December 2010, the teachers and staff at the school voted for it to become a charter school. This change took effect in the fall of 2011.

== Demographics ==
In 1998, the school had 3,315 students enrolled. 5% were African American, 1% American Indian, 15% Asian, 42% White, 29% Latino, 6% two or more races, 5% English learners, 7% special-education students, 43% gifted and talented, 22% economically disadvantaged, and 15% students moving in and out of this school during the year. Over 1,000 of them, as of 1998, were classified as "gifted and talented". Several area parents disliked the LAUSD magnet program points admission system, so they chose to instead move to the ECR attendance zone and enroll their gifted-classified children there.

As of 1998, 70% of ECR graduates went on to colleges and universities, compared to 52% overall for LAUSD.

== Academic competitions ==
=== Academic Decathlon team ===
The school's Academic Decathlon team won national titles in 1998, 2001, 2004, 2005, 2007, 2010, 2014, 2018, 2023, 2024, and 2025.

=== Junior Engineering Technical Society ===
The Junior Engineering Technical Society (JETS) promoted interest in engineering, science, math and technology in high school students and provides them with real-world engineering teamwork and problem-solving experiences. The team participates in the TEAMS (Test of Engineering Aptitude, Mathematics, and Science) Competition that occurs annually in March and is hosted and sponsored by the Viterbi School of Engineering at the University of Southern California (USC). The Technology Student Association acquired TEAMS from JETS in 2011.

- In 2006, the ECR JETS Team won second place at the Southern California Regional Varsity Competition, losing first place to Beverly Hills High School by one point.
- In 2007, the ECR JETS Team again won second place at the Southern California Regional Varsity Competition, increasing their score significantly by 7 points but once again losing first place to Beverly Hills High School by only one point.
- In 2008, the ECR JETS Team won first place at the Southern California Regional Varsity Competition, defeating rival Beverly Hills High School. El Camino Real also placed second in the state of California, and advanced to the nationals.
- In 2009, the ECR JETS Team tied second place with another high school at their division. However, the team only received the trophy of the third place because of a random tiebreaker.
- In 2010, the ECR JETS Team placed first in Regionals and progressed to Nationals.

Additionally, El Camino's NJROTC program was ranked nationally in 2024.

== Notable alumni ==
- Jackie Altschuld – professional soccer player
- Jamal Anderson – former NFL All-Pro, running back, Atlanta Falcons
- Mark Balderas – keyboardist, Human Drama
- Maggie Bandur – writer/producer; Malcolm in the Middle
- Orr Barouch – professional soccer player, formerly of the Chicago Fire
- Paul Beatty – poet/author; first American to win the Mann/Booker Prize in literature for his 2016 novel, The Sellout
- David Becker – jazz guitarist and composer
- Jay Bentley – bassist, Bad Religion
- Kurt Birkins – former Major League Baseball player, Baltimore Orioles, Tampa Bay Rays
- Alisha Boe – actress, 13 Reasons Why
- America Ferrera – award-winning actress; Ugly Betty, The Sisterhood of the Traveling Pants
- Sky Ferreira – singer/songwriter
- Jennifer Flavin – model
- Blake Gailen – American-Israeli baseball player
- Brad Garrett – actor, comedian; Everybody Loves Raymond, 'Til Death
- Marc Germain – radio talk show host
- Greg Graffin – vocalist, Bad Religion; university lecturer
- Brett Gurewitz – guitarist, Bad Religion; founder of Epitaph Records
- Tiffany Haddish – comedian, actress
- Jesse James Hollywood – convicted murderer portrayed by Emile Hirsch in the movie Alpha Dog
- Conor Jackson – former Major League Baseball left fielder/first baseman
- Nathan Kahane – executive producer; Oldboy, Last Vegas
- Allan Kennedy – former NFL player, San Francisco 49ers
- Christopher Knight – actor; Brady Bunch, My Fair Brady
- Sammi Kane Kraft – actress, Bad News Bears
- Ryan Lavarnway – American-Israeli Major League Baseball catcher
- Christy Lemire – film critic
- Amber Liu – singer, member of South Korean girl group f(x)
- Ryan McGuire – former Major League Baseball player
- Alex Mejia – MLB player for the St. Louis Cardinals
- Joel A. Miller – author, filmmaker Memoir of a Roadie, The Still Life (2007 film)
- Christopher Mintz-Plasse – actor; Superbad, Role Models, Kick-Ass
- Janel Moloney – actress; Donna Moss in The West Wing
- Angelo Moore – lead singer and multi-instrumentalist for Fishbone
- Marlene Morrow - Playboy Centerfold 1974
- Troy Nolan – NFL football player, safety
- David Oppenheim – professional poker player
- Sara Paxton – actress, model
- Elston Ridgle – NFL player, actor (Independence Day, Legion)
- Sam Sarpong – actor, model, TV host; Tommy Hillfiger, Yo Mamma
- Mark Saul – actor/musician; Grey's Anatomy, All That, The Social Network
- Eli Schenkel (born 1992) - Canadian Olympic fencer
- Mark Schulman – drummer
- Jonathan Shapiro (writer) – writer/producer; former Assistant U.S. Attorney
- Ramona Shelburne (born 1979) - sportswriter and softball player
- Glen Sobel – drummer, Alice Cooper
- Max Steinberg (1989–2014), American-Israeli IDF lone soldier killed in the 2014 Gaza War
- Tim Talman – actor
- Dave Walsh – former Major League Baseball player, Los Angeles Dodgers
- Jim Wolf – Major League Baseball umpire
- Randy Wolf – former Major League Baseball pitcher
- William Zabka – actor, The Karate Kid
