= Peter Dobson =

American actor (born 1964)

- Born: July 19, 1964 (age 61); Red Bank, New Jersey, U.S.
- Occupation: Actor
- Years active: 1986–present

Peter Dobson (born July 19, 1964) is an American actor. His film roles include appearances in Sing (1989), Last Exit to Brooklyn (1989), The Marrying Man (1991), The Frighteners (1996), and Drowning Mona (2000), in addition to a cameo as Elvis Presley in Forrest Gump (1994). On television, he starred as the title character in the CBS comedy Johnny Bago (1993) and the lead of the USA Network comedy-drama Cover Me (2000–2001).

Dobson was born at Riverview Medical Center in Red Bank, New Jersey, to an activist mother and a contractor father. He grew up in Middletown Township and attended Middletown High School South. He later lived in Loch Arbour.

Since 2015, he has been in talks to make his directorial debut with the film Exit 102: Asbury Park.

== Partial filmography ==
- Modern Girls (1986) - Alan (Margo's Ex who kisses like a lizard.) (uncredited)
- Plain Clothes (1987) - Kyle Kerns
- Defense Play (1987) - Ringo
- Sing (1989) - Dominic
- Last Exit to Brooklyn (1989) - Vinnie
- L.A. Takedown (1989, TV Movie) - Chris Sheherlis
- The Marrying Man (1991) - Tony
- Undertow (1991) - Sam
- Where the Day Takes You (1992) - Tommy Ray
- Doppelganger (1993) - Rob
- Forrest Gump (1994) - Young Elvis Presley
- Toughguy (1995) - Terry's Friend
- Party of Five (1995) - Morgan
- The Frighteners (1996) - Ray Lynskey
- The Big Squeeze (1996) - Benny O'Malley
- Riot (1997, TV Movie) - Chaz (segment "Empty")
- Quiet Days in Hollywood (1997) - Peter Blaine
- Head over Heels (1997, TV Series) - Jack Baldwin
- The Good Life (1997) - Gerard
- Nowhere Land (1998) - Dean
- A Table for One (1999) - Delivery Guy
- Drowning Mona (2000) - Feege
- Cover Me: Based on the True Life of an FBI Family (2000-2001, TV Series) - Danny Arno
- Double Down (2001) - Cory
- Snowbound (2001) - Gunnar Davis
- Poolhall Junkies (2002) - Cory
- Lady Jayne: Killer (2003) - Artie, Hitman #1
- Dry Cycle (2003) - Maddox
- Pledge of Allegiance (2003) - Salvatore Maldonado
- The Poseidon Adventure (2005, TV Movie) - Agent Percy
- Freezerburn (2005) - Vince Ruby
- A-List (2006) - Jason
- A Stranger's Heart (2007, TV Movie) - Jasper Cates
- Made in Brooklyn (2007) - Jack
- Protecting the King (2007) - Elvis Presley
- Remembering Phil (2008) - Howard Nessbaum
- 2:22 (2008) - Curtis
- Elwood (2011, Short)
- A Dark Day's Night (2012) - Pete
- American Idiots (2013) - Jesse Garrett
- Jet Set (2013) - Jerry
- 20 Feet Below: The Darkness Descending (2014) - Jason
- Fatal Instinct (2014) - Sgt. Birch
- The Mourning (2015) - Mike
- 6 Ways to Die (2015) - Detective Wilcox
- Hotel of the Damned (2016) - Jimmy
- The Demo (2016) - Ray Nelson
- Dirty Dead Con Men (2018) - Kook Packard
- Operation Blood Hunt (2024) - Stone
