= Big Sky Motion Pictures =

- Company type: Film
- Industry: Filmmaking
- Founder: Rand Chortkoff
- Headquarters: Los Angeles, California, United States
- Area served: Worldwide
- Key people: Rand Chortkoff
- Website: bigskymotionpictures.com

Big Sky Motion Pictures is an American film production company founded by executive producer Rand Chortkoff.

The company produced the last film to date What Love Is. It was released on 42 cinemas and grossed $18,901.

In 2008, Chortkoff was ordered to desist-and-refrain from selling of securities in California for the film Spring Break '83. The company was unable to complete the film due to low funds, and had some trouble paying the vendors and workers. However, Chortkoff managed to settle the lawsuit.

On January 9, 2012, an interlocutory injunction was issued against Chortkoff, Big Sky Motion Pictures, and Spring Break '83 for various lawsuits.

On February 20, 2014, the company was indicted by the United States Department of Justice for committing securities fraud.

== Productions ==
- Spring Break '83
- Double Down (2001)
- Poolhall Junkies (2002)
- What Love Is (2007)
