= Erika Eleniak =

American actress and model (born 1969)

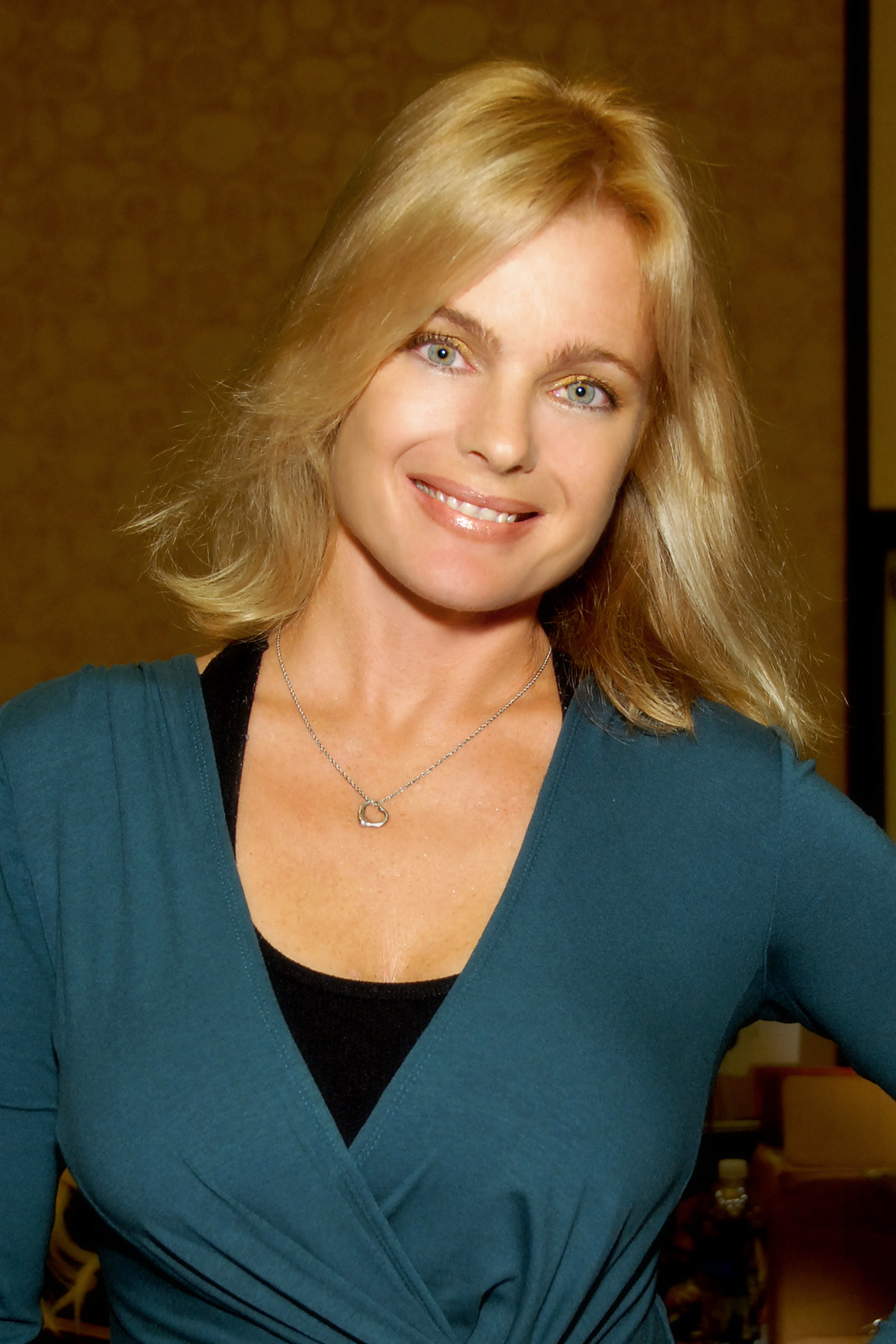
- Eleniak in 2011
- Born: Erika Maya Eleniak; September 29, 1969 (age 57); Glendale, California, U.S.
- Occupations: Actress; Model
- Years active: 1980–present

Playboy centerfold appearance
- July 1989
- Preceded by: Tawnni Cable
- Succeeded by: Gianna Amore

Personal details
- Height: 5 ft 6 in (168 cm)
- Spouses: Philip Goglia (m. 1998; div. 1999) Roch Daigle (m. 2005)
- Children: 1

Signature
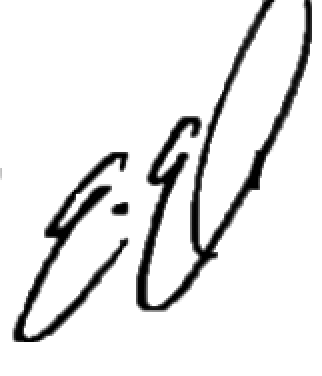

Erika Maya Eleniak (born September 29, 1969) is an American actress and model known for her role as Shauni McClain in Baywatch. Her film debut was in E.T. the Extra-Terrestrial (1982). She also starred in the films The Blob (1988), Under Siege (1992), and The Beverly Hillbillies (1993). She was also Playmate of the Month for July 1989.

== Early life ==
Eleniak was born in Glendale, California. Her father had moved to the area of Los Angeles from Canada in order to start a film career. One of her ancestors was Wasyl Eleniak, a native of Eastern Galicia, who in 1891 became a pioneer of Ukrainian immigration to Canada.

== Career ==
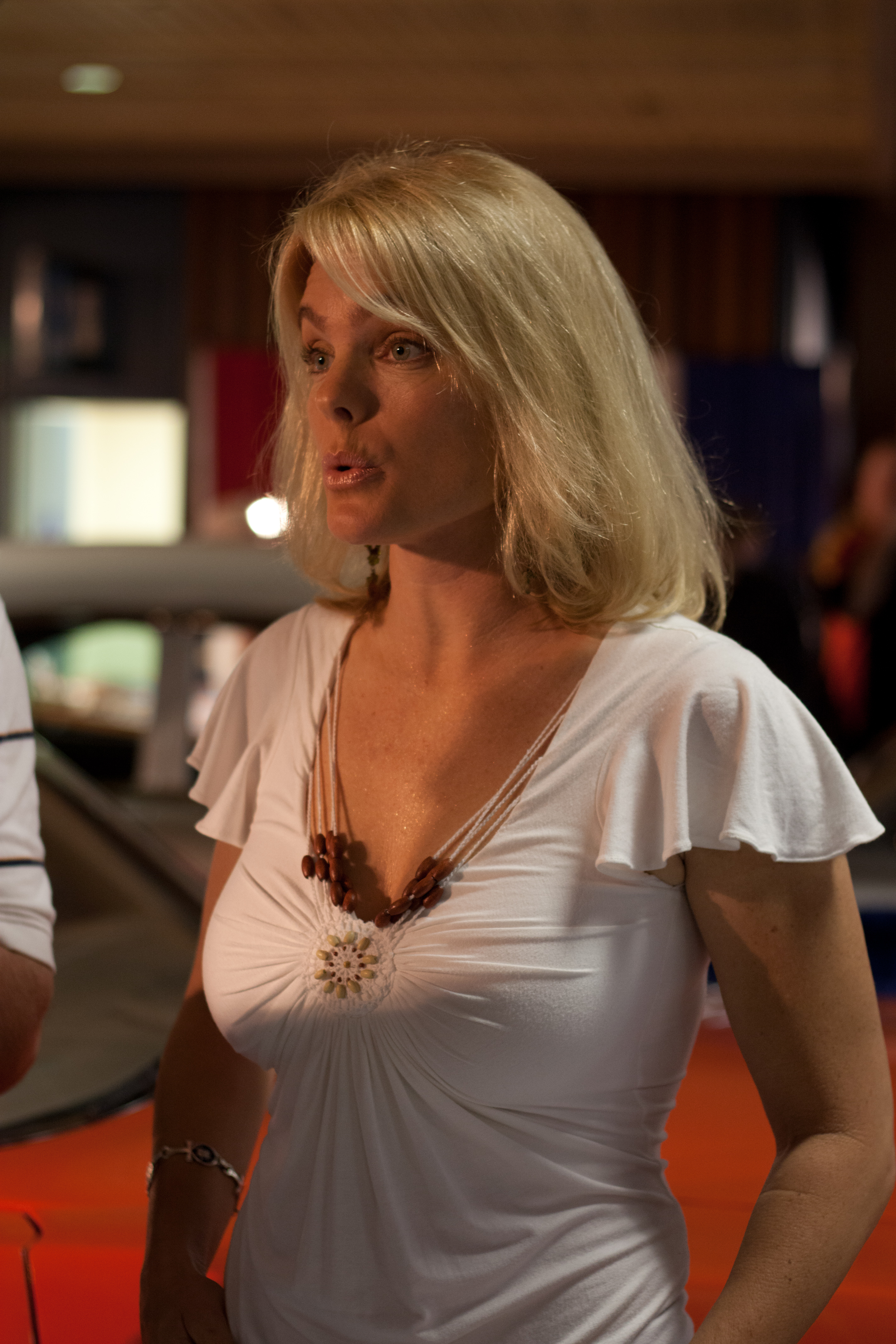
Eleniak in 2010

Eleniak's first feature-film role was at age 12, in the 1982 film E.T. the Extra-Terrestrial as the girl kissed by Elliott Taylor (Henry Thomas) in the classroom scene. Her 10-year-old costar, Thomas, told People magazine that he disliked filming the scene: "When I had to kiss the girl, I had to do it two times! I don't like girls." In 1988, Eleniak appeared as Vicki De Soto, a victim of the creature in the horror film The Blob, which was a remake of the 1958 film of the same name.

Eleniak appeared on the cover of Playboy in April 1989 and again in July 1989 in a pictorial with a nautical theme. That same year, she began a recurring role in the TV series Charles in Charge as Charles (Scott Baio)'s girlfriend Stephanie Curtis, and also won a role on Baywatch as female lead Shauni McClain, which she played from 1989 to 1992. She also played Carrie, the high-school girlfriend of Jesse Katsopolis (John Stamos), in "One Last Kiss," the November 16, 1990 fourth season episode of Full House.

In 1992, Eleniak returned to film acting, playing Jordan Tate, a Playboy Playmate hired to perform a striptease for J.T. Adams (Patrick O'Neal), the captain of a U.S. Navy battleship in Under Siege. In the film, she is described as "Miss July 1989"—the month that Eleniak was Playmate of the Month in real life.

Eleniak had a starring role as Elly May Clampett in the screen adaptation of The Beverly Hillbillies in 1993. The next year, she starred in the Dennis Hopper-directed romantic comedy film Chasers with William McNamara. Eleniak shot another movie with McNamara, Girl in the Cadillac (1995), and starred as identical twins Jamie and Janie in the interactive 1995 video game Panic in the Park. She continued appear in independent films and on television. Eleniak appeared on the reality television series The Real Gilligan's Island in June 2005.

Eleniak has suffered from weight issues. At one point, she was underweight due to an eating disorder and was once hospitalized for laxative abuse. By 2006, she was overweight and participated in the fourth season of VH1's Celebrity Fit Club.

In 2006, Eleniak appeared on '80s Movie and Music Fest Cafe, a British comedy podcast on iTunes, in which she discussed her career with presenters Ross Dyer and Julian Bayes. She gave a lighthearted view of Baywatch and her challenge during filming of Celebrity Fit Club.

On April 15, 2026, it was announced that Eleniak will reprise her role as Shauni McClain in the Baywatch reboot.

According to TMZ Eleniak launched an OnlyFans account in August 2026. TMZ further reported she was on pace to earn $1 million in her first year on the platform.

== Personal life ==
Eleniak was once engaged to her Baywatch co-star Billy Warlock, who had played Eddie Kramer, her love interest on the show, as well. Eleniak married bodybuilder Philip Goglia on May 22, 1998, but after just six months, the marriage ended in divorce. After filming Snowbound in 2001 in Calgary, Alberta, Eleniak became enamored with the city. She began dating Roch Daigle, a key grip who worked on the set. She had wanted to leave Los Angeles as she found commuting to and from Telluride, Colorado difficult. She purchased a home in Calgary, where Daigle lived. The two eventually married. Eleniak became pregnant in 2005, but six and a half weeks into her term, the pregnancy was discovered to be ectopic, which required emergency surgery, and ended in a miscarriage. Eleniak later became pregnant again and gave birth to a daughter.

== Filmography ==
=== Film ===
Year	Title	Role	Notes
1982	E.T. the Extra-Terrestrial	Pretty Girl	
1983	Imps*	Brooke Shields	Released in 2009
1988	The Blob	Vicki De Soto	
1992	Under Siege	Jordan Tate	
1993	The Beverly Hillbillies	Elly May Clampett	
1994	Chasers	Seaman Toni Johnson	
1995	Girl in the Cadillac	Amanda "Mandy" Baker	
1995	A Pyromaniac's Love Story	Stephanie Potts	
1996	Bordello of Blood	Katherine Verdoux	
1997	She's So Lovely	Playmate	
1998	Captive	Samantha Hoffman	
1998	The Pandora Project	Wendy Lane	
1998	Charades	Monica	
1999	Love Stinks	Gina	Voice
1999	Stealth Fighter	Erin Mitchell	
1999	Final Voyage	Gloria Franklin	
2000	The Opponent	Patty Sullivan	
2001	Vegas, City of Dreams	Katherine Garrett	
2001	Snowbound	Barbara Cates	
2002	Second to Die	Sara Morgan Bratchett Scucello	
2002	Shakedown	Julie Hayes	
2003	Lady Jayne: Killer	Emily Shaw	
2003	The Librarians	Sandi Clark	
2004	Brilliant	Ricky Smith	
2005	Caught in the Headlights	Kate Parker	
2010	Changing Hands	Woman in the Park	
2012	Meant to Be	Linda Dickson	
2017	Boone: The Bounty Hunter	Herself	
2019	Cor Values	Veronica MacDougall	
2024	Lolipop Gang	Herself	

=== Television ===
Year	Title	Role	Notes
1987	Silver Spoons	Samantha	Episode: "Rumors Are Flying"
1987	Still the Beaver	Lynn	Episode: "I Had It All"
1988	Broken Angel	Jaime Coburn	Television film
1988	Boys Will Be Boys	Monica	Episode: "The Front"
1989	Charles in Charge	Stephanie Curtis	3 episodes
1989	Baywatch: Panic at Malibu Pier	Shauni McClain	Television film
1989–1992	Baywatch	Shauni McClain	Main cast (45 episodes)
1990	Daughter of the Streets	Jennifer	Television film
1990	Full House	Carrie Fowler	Episode: "One Last Kiss"
1997	Ed McBain's 87th Precinct: Heatwave	Detective Eileen Burke	Television film
1998	Brooklyn South	Officer Christine Bannon	3 episodes
1998	One Hot Summer Night	Kelly Moore Brooks	Television film
1999	Fantasy Island	Sybil Hammond	2 episodes
1999	Aftershock: Earthquake in New York	Jillian Parnell	Miniseries
2002	Christmas Rush	Catherine "Cat" Morgan	Television film
2002	He Sees You When You're Sleeping	Annie Campbell	Television film
2004	Fatal Lessons: The Good Teacher	Victoria Paige	Television film
2004	Dracula 3000	Aurora Ash	Television film
2005	Fatal Reunion	Jessica Hartley Landers	Television film
2005	The Real Gilligan's Island	Ginger - Green Team	Main cast (4 episodes)
2006	Absolute Zero	Bryn	Television film
2006	Celebrity Fit Club	Herself	Main cast (6 episodes)
2008	Germany's Next Topmodel	Herself	Episode: "Episode 10"
2010	CSI: Miami	Claire Peterson	Episode: "See No Evil"
2010	Desperate Housewives	Barbara Fine	Episode: "A Humiliating Business"
2012	Holiday Spin	Roxy	Television film
2023	Meet the Richardsons	Herself	Episode: "Episode #4.8"

=== Video games ===
Year	Title	Role
1995	Panic in the Park	Janie / Jamie

Fawna MacLaren	Simone Eden	Laurie Wood	Jennifer Lyn Jackson	Monique Noel	Tawnni Cable
Erika Eleniak	Gianna Amore	Karin and Mirjam van Breeschooten	Karen Foster	Renee Tenison	Petra Verkaik
