= Joel A. Miller =

British-American writer and filmmaker

- Born: Cambridge, England, UK
- Other names: Rifken, Joel Roadie
- Occupations: Writer, cinematographer, film producer, film director, lyricist

Joel A. Miller is a British-American writer and filmmaker. He was the writer and director of the film The Still Life and wrote the autobiography Memoir of a Roadie.

== Early life ==
Miller was born in Cambridge, England. His parents emigrated to Los Angeles when he was a child and he grew up in Southern California. He is the oldest of three children. When he was four years old, Miller's mother was stopped in a shopping mall by talent agent Dorothy Day Otis and he began working as a child actor and model.

In 1998 he graduated from the University of California, Santa Barbara with a degree in Art History.

== Career ==
=== Music ===
In 1999, Miller worked at Brian Reeves recording studio the Jungle Room. While there he worked for Poison, Billy Idol, and Dogstar.

In 2006, Warner Bros. released The Still Life Soundtrack. Miller co-wrote most of the songs on the album including the song "God's Reasons", performed by Darius Rucker. In 2006 Miller was a recipient of the ASCAP Plus award for the song "God's Reasons". In 2010 the song "Silent Light", co-written by Miller and performed by Dizzy Reed, appeared in the film Holyman Undercover.

In August 2020, he released his autobiography, Memoir of a Roadie, about working as a roadie for Stone Temple Pilots, Guns N' Roses, Poison, and The Cranberries. The book tells of his life touring with these bands and his further touring experiences with Black Sabbath, Ozzy Osbourne, Sharon Osbourne, Red Hot Chili Peppers, Foo Fighters, Oasis, Papa Roach, Disturbed, Godsmack, Warrant, Quiet Riot, NSYNC, Bush, No Doubt, Fishbone, Fuel, Korn, Metallica, Green Day, Kid Rock, Rage Against the Machine, Enuff Z'Nuff, The Turtles, Violent Femmes, Static-X, Everclear (band), Third Eye Blind, Goo Goo Dolls, Slipknot, 3 Doors Down, and Veruca Salt.

=== Film ===
Working as a teen in the art department Miller worked on films Things You Can Tell Just by Looking at Her, It's the Rage, Lucky 13, Durango Kids, and Second to Die.

In 2006 Warner Bros. released Miller's The Still Life. Miller wrote, produced, and directed the film. The film screened throughout the country and won the bronze medal at the Park City Film Music Festival.

=== Art & Memorabilia ===
Miller began his career in 1991 at fourteen years old when he joined I.M. Chait Auction Gallery. While working at Chait Gallery, he developed a deep interest in Japanese art and soon began selling pieces through major auction houses.

By 2010, Miller transitioned into working full-time as an art dealer, collaborating closely with leading institutions including Bonhams, Los Angeles Modern Auctions, Sotheby’s, Christie’s, Swann Galleries & Phillips (auctioneers). His private sales have placed works with renowned institutions such as the Smithsonian Institution, Peabody Museum of Salem, the Nash Museum, ONE National Gay & Lesbian Archives, Los Angeles County Museum of Art, Glendale Library, Arts & Culture, Lucas Museum of Narrative Art, and the Calder Foundation.

In 2012, Anthony Hopkins commissioned Miller to curate his personal art collection.

Expanding into memorabilia in 2014, Miller began working with Profiles in History and Heritage Auctions. He currently owns the complete original handwritten 166-page score for Pink Floyd’s landmark album The Wall—a historically significant manuscript exhibited in Pink Floyd: Their Mortal Remains and now on loan to the Rock and Roll Hall of Fame.

A devoted collector of artist Raymond Pettibon, Miller also has several Black Flag (band) artifacts on loan to The Punk Rock Museum.

=== Podcasting ===
Miller is the creator and host of Party Like a Rockstar Podcast.

As of December 2025, the podcast features over 3500 episodes on YouTube. Previous guests have consisted of mostly friends and colleagues of Miller. A partial list of guests include: Doug Clifford, Angelo Moore, Emilio Castillo, Dave Sabo, Dizzy Reed, Corey Glover, Albert Bouchard, Andy Shernoff, Bruce Watson (American guitarist), Davey Johnstone, Michael Grais, Matt Bissonette (musician), Steve Hackett, Mike Davenport, Dilana, Eric Dover, Ahmet Zappa, Kurt Deimer, Ladybeard, Ari Nagel, Terry Ilous, Tony Fagenson, Willie Chambers, Roger Joseph Manning Jr., Thomas O'Keefe, May Pang, Blind Channel, Victor DeLorenzo, Mark Oliver Everett, Martin Popoff, Jim Pons, Jason Sutter, The Georgia Thunderbolts, Felix Cavaliere, Alan Hewitt (musician), Everett Bradley (musician), Bruce Sudano, David Spero, Trevor Lawrence (musician), Bryan Martin (singer), Gareth Dunlop, Jonny Polonsky, Carmine Appice, Bob Regan, Rob De Luca, Al Snow, Aron Stevens, Sean Rowe (musician), The Unlikely Candidates, Doug Carrion, Billy Hayes (writer), Tony Timpone, Al Staehely, & W. G. Snuffy Walden.

== Selected filmography ==
Year	Title	Role	Episode
1996	Party of Five	Wrestler	"Gimme Shelter"
1996	Party of Five	Wrestler	"Desperate Measures"
1997	Party of Five	Wrestler	"Significant Others"
1997	Party of Five	Wrestler	"Hitting Bottom"
1999	It's the Rage	Set dresser	
1999	Durango Kids	Set dresser	
2000	Things You Can Tell Just by Looking at Her	Set dresser	
2000	Little Sister	Set decorator	
2002	Second to Die	Set dresser	
2005	Wannabe	Bar patron	
2005	Lucky 13	Set dresser	
2006	The Still Life	Writer, producer, director	
2006	America's Low Budget Superstar	Self	
2006	The Iron Man	Producer	
2007	Living the Still Life	Producer, self	
2007	Giant Maximus	Producer, writer, self	
2008	Desertion	Producer, writer, officer danescroft, songwriter	
2008	Celebrity Art Show	Writer, producer, director	
2010	Holyman Undercover	(Producer: "Silent Light") / (Writer: "Silent Light")	
2010	Cyrus: Mind of a Serial Killer	Casting director	
2012	Errors of the Human Body	Executive producer	

== Books ==
- Memoir of a Roadie, Albion Entertainment Inc., 2020, ISBN 9798670742405
- Xemu Pulled My Finger, Albion Entertainment Inc., 2025, ISBN 9798218642129

== Soundtracks ==
- The Still Life Soundtrack, Danescroft Music Publishing, 2007
- Desertion Soundtrack, Danescroft Music Publishing, 2008
- Holyman Undercover Soundtrack, Danescroft Music Publishing, 2010
