= Mars Callahan =

American actor

- Born: April 14, 1971 (age 55); Studio City, California, United States
- Occupations: Actor, film director, producer, writer
- Years active: 1985–present
- Height: 6 ft 6 in (1.98 m)

Mars Callahan (born as Gregory Mars Martin, April 14, 1971) is an American actor, film director, producer, and writer.

He is perhaps best known for the film Poolhall Junkies where he served as director, actor and screenwriter.

== Career ==
At the age of eleven, Callahan toured with a children's musical group through thirty-seven states. At fifteen he received his first acting role in the television series The Wonder Years. He subsequently appeared in various films. Inspired by the directors he worked with, Callahan decided to try working behind the camera and in 1998 shot his first short film The Red Bag.

Callahan worked at the production company Big Sky Motion Pictures alongside executive producer Rand Chortkoff.

According to a 2007 interview with The Hollywood Reporter, Callahan had serious health problems when doctors found a tumor in his right kidney. He lost his right kidney and right adrenal gland, and was in and out of a wheelchair for years.

Callahan cashed in 94th place in the 2011 World Series of Poker main event, earning $64,531.

In 2020, Callahan helped form VEUIT, a streaming media and social media platform.

== Selected filmography ==
- 1986: The Children of Times Square
- 1992: Highway to Hell
- 1993: Kalifornia
- 1994: Clifford
- 1996: That Thing You Do!
- 2001: Double Down
- 2002: Poolhall Junkies
- 2007: What Love Is
- 2016: Four Kings
- Unreleased: Spring Break '83
