= What Love Is =

2007 film

- Release poster
- Directed by: Mars Callahan
- Written by: Mars Callahan
- Produced by: George Bours; John Hermansen; Mars Callahan
- Starring: Cuba Gooding Jr. Matthew Lillard; Sean Astin; Anne Heche; Gina Gershon
- Cinematography: David Stump
- Edited by: Andrew Dickler; Joe Plenys
- Music by: Erik Godal
- Distributed by: Big Sky Motion Pictures
- Release date: March 23, 2007
- Running time: 88 minutes
- Country: United States
- Language: English
- Budget: $8.5 million

What Love Is is a 2007 romantic comedy film, written and directed by Mars Callahan and starring Cuba Gooding Jr., Matthew Lillard, Sean Astin, Anne Heche, and Gina Gershon.

== Premise ==
The film is set during a single evening, mostly in a man's apartment (Cuba Gooding, Jr.) on the Valentine's Day he intends to propose to his girlfriend. Before he can pop the question, he arrives home to discover she has mostly moved out. Then, several childhood friends and later several women arrive for a planned Valentine's party, all of which give their takes on relationships, love and interacting.

== Cast ==
- Cuba Gooding, Jr. as Tom
- Matthew Lillard as Sal
- Sean Astin as George
- Mars Callahan as Ken
- Andrew Daly as Wayne
- Gina Gershon as Rachel
- Anne Heche as Laura
- Tamala Jones as Katherine
- Shiri Appleby as Debbie
- Jud Tylor as Amy
- T.C. Carson as Kwame
- Gillian Shure as Karen
- Victoria Pratt as Sara
- Steve Makhanian as Bogie, The Clerk

== Reception ==
=== Box office ===
The film made roughly $19,000 at 42 theaters during its theatrical run.

=== Critical response ===
On the review aggregator website Rotten Tomatoes, 17% of 12 critics' reviews are positive, with an average rating of 4.2/10. Metacritic, which uses a weighted average, assigned the film a score of 14 out of 100, based on eight critics, indicating "overwhelming dislike".

== Home media ==
The film was released on DVD on April 1, 2008.
