= Elston Ridgle =

American football player (born 1963)

No. 96, 98, 74, 72
- Position: Defensive end

Personal information
- Born: August 24, 1963 (age 63); Los Angeles, California, U.S.
- Listed height: 6 ft 6 in (1.98 m)
- Listed weight: 265 lb (120 kg)

Career information
- High school: El Camino Real (Los Angeles)
- College: Northern Arizona; Nevada
- NFL draft: 1986: undrafted

Career history
- Los Angeles Rams (1986)*; San Francisco 49ers (1987); Buffalo Bills (1988-1989); Seattle Seahawks (1989); Phoenix Cardinals (1990); Green Bay Packers (1991)*; Cincinnati Bengals (1992); Los Angeles Raiders (1993)
- * Offseason or practice squad member only
- Stats at Pro Football Reference

Elston Ridgle (born August 24, 1963) is an American former professional football player who was a defensive end in the National Football League (NFL). He played college football for the Northern Arizona Lumberjacks and Nevada Wolf Pack. He played in the NFL for the San Francisco 49ers in 1987, the Buffalo Bills and Seattle Seahawks in 1989, the Phoenix Cardinals in 1990 and the Cincinnati Bengals in 1992.

Ridgle also is an actor appearing in over 10 feature films including the blockbuster “Independence Day”. He also starred in numerous TV shows including “Coach” and “Martin”. In addition, Ridgle has starred in and directed numerous music videos. Ridgle married Erika Ridgle in 2020.
