= The Good Life (1997 film) =

- Directed by: Alan Mehrez
- Written by: Alan Mehrez
- Produced by: Alan Amiel; Alan Mehrez; Diane Mehrez
- Starring: Frank Stallone; Dennis Hopper; Peter Dobson; Andrew Dice Clay
- Cinematography: Mark Gilfedder
- Edited by: Alan Mehrez
- Music by: John L. Horn; Alex Wurman
- Production companies: DEM Films; Film Crash
- Running time: 95 minutes
- Country: United States
- Language: English
- Budget: $5,000,000

The Good Life is an unreleased American crime comedy film, written and directed by Alan Mehrez (who replaced original director Barry Samson), and starring Frank Stallone. The film is about three men who move from New Jersey to Miami; two of them end up killing the third.

Because of numerous production problems, the independent project shoot was moved from Miami to Mexico. The film was never released commercially due to legal action initiated by Sylvester Stallone, who did a cameo in the film as a favor to his brother. He claims that a promotion reel used his scene excessively, therefore was promoting him as the star, instead of the cameo that he had agreed upon. He sued for $20 million; his average salary at the time. The producers countersued, and, in 1999, the case was settled out of court.

== Plot ==
Three guys move from New Jersey to Miami and two of them end up killing the third.

== Cast ==
- Frank Stallone as Tony Piano
- Dennis Hopper as Mr. B
- Peter Dobson as Gerard
- Andrew Dice Clay as Albert
- Tony Sirico as Junior
- Erik Betts as Charles
- David Anthony Pizzuto as Fredo
- Sylvester Stallone had a cameo as a Boss

== Production ==
The budget of this independent film was around 5 million dollars. The project began production in March 1997. Filming took place between April and June of the same year, in Los Angeles. The director at the start of the project was Barry Samson, who left and was replaced by screenwriter and producer Alan Mehrez; Samson is not credited in the film.

The presence of Sylvester Stallone in the film was limited to a simple cameo, a favor he, along with his brother Frank, the protagonist of the film, made to the siblings Alan and Diane Mehrez, producers of the film. The problems arose when the Mehrez siblings promoted the film as soon as the shooting was over, as if Stallone were the protagonist; the plaintiff sued the two producers and the distribution of the film was thus blocked. The film was canceled and still remains unpublished, as Stallone asked for 20 million dollars to let the film be distributed with its leading name, his average salary during that period.

== Release ==
Only one video remains of the film that the production company DEM Films has broadcast through the CNN channel.
