= DeWain Valentine =

American sculptor (1936–2022)

Double Pyramid by DeWain Valentine, 1968, cast polyester resin, Honolulu Museum of Art

De Wain Valentine (1936 – February 20, 2022) was an American minimalist sculptor who was born in Fort Collins, Colorado. Often associated with the Light and Space movement in the 1960s, he is best known for his minimalist sculptures of translucent glass (such as Diamond Column in the collection of the Honolulu Museum of Art), fiberglass and cast polyester resin (such as Double Pyramid in the collection of the Honolulu Museum of Art) having slick surfaces suggestive of machine made objects. He lived and worked in Gardena, California.

== Early life and career ==
Valentine worked in boat shops and began to make art pieces from plastic, which he tried unsuccessfully to show in New York City. He received his B.F.A from the University of Colorado, Boulder in 1958. During his time at the school, he studied alongside American painter, Richard Diebenkorn, whom he credits with turning Valentine onto color. Attracted by the work of artists such as Larry Bell, Craig Kauffman, and Kenneth Price, which he learned about by reading the magazine Artforum, Valentine moved to Los Angeles in 1965 and had his first solo show at the Ace Gallery in 1968.

== Work ==
Influenced by the seascapes and skies of Southern California, Valentine was an early pioneer of using industrial plastics and resin to produce monumental sculptures that reflect and distort the light and space that surround them. For Valentine, a smooth surface was the whole point of the work and he did not want it to look old. While he was teaching a course in plastics technology at UCLA in 1965, he wanted to produce a polyester resin in large volumes that would not crack from curing. He began working with a chemical engineer from PPG Industries Ed Revay, and eventually they discovered the Valentine MasKast Resin in 1966. The highly stable resin allowed him and other artists to go far beyond the 50-pound limit to which they had once been restricted. It was in 1968 that Valentine was able to move into sculpting on a human scale after making a breakthrough with a new casting process. After years of working with plastic and resin, Valentine began to work with glass. His initial use of glass can be seen in his exhibition held at the University of California, Irvine's Fine Art Gallery from September 17 - October 13, 1979. The use of glass marked a turning point for Valentine's work, and solved many of the technological and physical issues that came with working with the former materials. In 1989, Valentine designed the Governor's Awards for the Arts, presented by the California Arts Council to artists, arts patrons and community leaders.

The technology Valentine was working with allowed him to created tall column sculptures. These can be seen in pieces such as, Diamond Column (1978), which is actually one the last works he created in cast resin. This sculpture is close to eight feet tall and four feet wide. The edges of the work remain at half an inch wide is about a foot deep at its widest point. This piece, along with his other tall columns, carries his illusory structure, managing to change in opaqueness and transparency depending on the angle it is being viewed at. Viewing it from one of the two sides, you'd see the four sides are rounded but the corners going down the central seams are sharp. The colors he implements are blue-green, green-blue, lavender, and bronze. This piece has been described as a challenge to create by Valentine. The challenge lied in that Valentine and his assistants resorted to rendering the surfaces of the sculpture by hand.

== Personal life and death ==
Valentine died on February 20, 2022, at the age of 86.

== Collections ==
The Denver Art Museum, the Honolulu Museum of Art, the Louisiana State University Museum of Art (Baton Rouge, Louisiana), the Museum of Modern Art (New York), the Norton Simon Museum (Pasadena), the Nora Eccles Harrison Museum of Art (Utah State University, Logan, Utah), and the San Diego Museum of Art (San Diego, California) and the Seattle Art Museum are among the public collections holding work by DeWain Valentine. Among the many Corporate Art Collections that have excellent examples of Valentine's work are the Atlantic Richfield Corporate Art Collection (Los Angeles & New York offices); and the Anaconda Corporation (Denver).

== Recognition ==
In 1980, Valentine received a fellowship by the John Simon Guggenheim Memorial Foundation.

== Art market ==
In October 2011, Valentine’s Circle, a robin’s egg blue resin disk only 17 inches in diameter, sold at L.A. Modern Auctions for $32,500, a record for the artist and well over six times the high estimate of $5,000. Monumental disks by Valentine can go for $500,000 to $1 million.

== Exhibitions ==
- Edmonton Art Gallery, An Exhibition of five recent works by Larry Bell, John McCracken, DeWain Valentine, Ron Cooper [and] Peter Alexander, Edmonton, Canada, Edmonton Art, 1971.
- Milwaukee Art Center, Eight Artists: Lynda Benglis, Sam Gilliam, Ralph Goings, Hans Haacke, Duane Hanson, Sol LeWitt, DeWain Valentine, Richard Van Buren, Milwaukee, Milwaukee Art Center, 1971.
- Pasadena Art Museum, DeWain Valentine: Recent Sculpture, Pasadena, Calif., Pasadena Art Museum, 1970.
- Long Beach Museum of Art, Spectrum Horizon Installation, 1975
- Fine Arts Gallery, DeWain Valentine, University of California, Irvine, 1979.
- Valentine, DeWain, DeWain Valentine 1985, Honolulu, D. Valentine, 1985.
- Valentine, DeWain, DeWain Valentine, An Exhibition Organized by the La Jolla Museum of Contemporary Art, La Jolla, Calif., La Jolla Museum of Contemporary Art, 1975.
- Erik Barnes and Daniel Desure (2011), From Start to Finish: The Story of Gray Column, a 29-minute documentary film about the making and restoration of Valentine's art, screened at the Getty Center in 2011–2012 in conjunction with an exhibit of Valentine's art there and shown at the 2012 Newport Beach Film Festival .
