= Chasers =

- Theatrical release poster
- Directed by: Dennis Hopper
- Screenplay by: Joe Batteer; John Rice; Dan Gilroy
- Story by: Joe Batteer; John Rice
- Produced by: James G. Robinson
- Starring: Tom Berenger; Erika Eleniak; William McNamara; Gary Busey
- Cinematography: Ueli Steiger
- Edited by: Christian Wagner
- Music by: Dwight Yoakam; Pete Anderson
- Production company: Morgan Creek Productions
- Distributed by: Warner Bros.
- Release date: April 22, 1994
- Running time: 101 minutes
- Country: United States
- Language: English
- Budget: $15 million
- Box office: $1.6 million

Chasers is a 1994 American comedy film directed by Dennis Hopper. It is about a pair of United States Navy shore patrollers (SPs) (Tom Berenger and William McNamara) who must escort a beautiful prisoner (Erika Eleniak), and the troubles they encounter. Chasers received mixed reviews from critics and was a box office flop, grossing just $1.6 million against a production budget of $15 million.

== Plot ==
Eddie Devane is a young sailor who has carried out a number of inventory-related scams along with his partner-in-crime Howard and made a lot of money during his service. A day before his discharge, Eddie is assigned to escort a prisoner from the Marine Corps Base at Camp Lejeune along with the authoritarian, no-nonsense Chief Petty Officer Rock Reilly. Eddie is of course not pleased with this development. When Howard sees a grumpy-looking Eddie being escorted from his superior's office by a couple of other seaman, he thinks Eddie has been found out and arrested for his scams. In order to destroy evidence, he goes to Eddie's desk and finds the money, the existence of which Eddie had concealed from him.

Eddie and Rock's personalities clash many times during the trip to Camp Lejeune. When they reach their destination, they discover that the prisoner they are transporting is a beautiful young girl, Toni Johnson. However, they soon discover that taking her back is no easy job when she attempts to escape disguised as a waitress at a diner but is caught. Later, she feigns the onset of her period and puts tampons inside the van's gas tank which leads to the van being stalled in the road. While walking, the trio come across an abandoned mine and accidentally fall down the shaft. They try to get out standing on each other's shoulders. Toni gets out first, ditches them and runs away, but has a change of heart later and comes back for them.

They stay for the night in a motel while their van is being repaired. They converse and bond in a diner, where it is revealed that Rock is divorced from his wife and estranged from his son, and Toni had first gone AWOL to visit her delinquent, drug-addicted brother in a hospital. When the authorities attempted to arrest her, she resisted and made more attempts to escape, leading to her current sentence; her brother died while she was in prison. This makes Eddie and Rock see her in a new light and understand the motivations behind her actions. Later in the night, Eddie finds out that Howard has taken all the money as well as the new car Eddie was planning to buy. He calls Howard, who says he was tired of being used, but says if Eddie answers a riddle he will turn around: "How do you talk to the fish?", which Eddie cannot answer. Unbeknownst to them, Toni listens to their conversation on another receiver, and realizes he embezzled $150,000 from the Navy. Distressed, Eddie gets drunk. When he returns to the motel, Toni seduces him, and the two have sex.

Next morning, Eddie wakes up and sees Toni has run away. She steals the car of the man who picked her up. While giving her chase, Eddie and Rock's van accidentally climbs up an artificial volcano in an amusement park and falls down but they both escape unhurt. They catch up with Toni only to discover that her brother's funeral is soon and she is running away with the intention of being present there. Frustrated with the situation, Rock and Eddie have a fistfight. The three then go to a bar, where Toni apologizes to Eddie for fleeing that morning and mentions "Drop them a line", answering Howard's riddle, revealing she had accidentally listened in on the conversation; she then brokers a reconciliation between Eddie and Rock. They journey to their base and hand Toni over.

Eddie realizes that he is in love with Toni and wants to rescue her. Rock is of agreement. When Toni is being transported to the prison to begin her sentence, Eddie and Rock sabotage the van in the same way as she had sabotaged their van earlier. Eddie impersonates a tow truck driver and takes the van away with Toni inside, while the Navy guards are outside the truck.

In the epilogue set one year later, Eddie and Toni are living it up "somewhere south of the border," and Rock, now retired from the Navy, has begun a relationship with a waitress he met at the diner before.

== Cast ==
- Tom Berenger as Chief Petty Officer Rock Reilly
- William McNamara as Quartermaster Seaman Apprentice Edward Devane
- Erika Eleniak as Seaman Toni Johnson
- Crispin Glover as Seaman Recruit Howard Finster
- Dennis Hopper as "Doggie"
- Gary Busey as Sergeant Vince Banger
- Seymour Cassel as Master Chief Seymie Bogg
- Dean Stockwell as Salesman Stig
- Bitty Schram as Flo

== Reception ==
Chasers received mixed reviews from critics, holding a 33% approval rating on Rotten Tomatoes based on 6 reviews, with an average score of 4.1/10. Kevin Thomas of the Los Angeles Times praised Hopper for delivering a "rip-roaring comic adventure" for his three main leads to sink their teeth into and the writing team for providing him a "deft mix of slapstick, sharp repartee and sentiment" in the script, concluding that: "There's a lot of screwball humor in Chasers' classically amoral plot, yet adding to the film's freshness is that visually it's an affectionate running commentary on the amusing tackiness of roadside Americana." The New York Times' Janet Maslin praised the performances of Berenger, McNamara and Eleniak for rising above the film's unbelievable plot and "cheesecake" qualities of their roles and the colorful aspects of the supporting cast, concluding that: "These characters aren't really connected, but Mr. Hopper's imprint is strong enough to turn them all into kindred spirits."

== Year-end lists ==
- Worst films (not ranked) – Jeff Simon, The Buffalo News
- Honorable mention – David Elliott, The San Diego Union-Tribune
