= Troy Nolan =

American football player (born 1986)

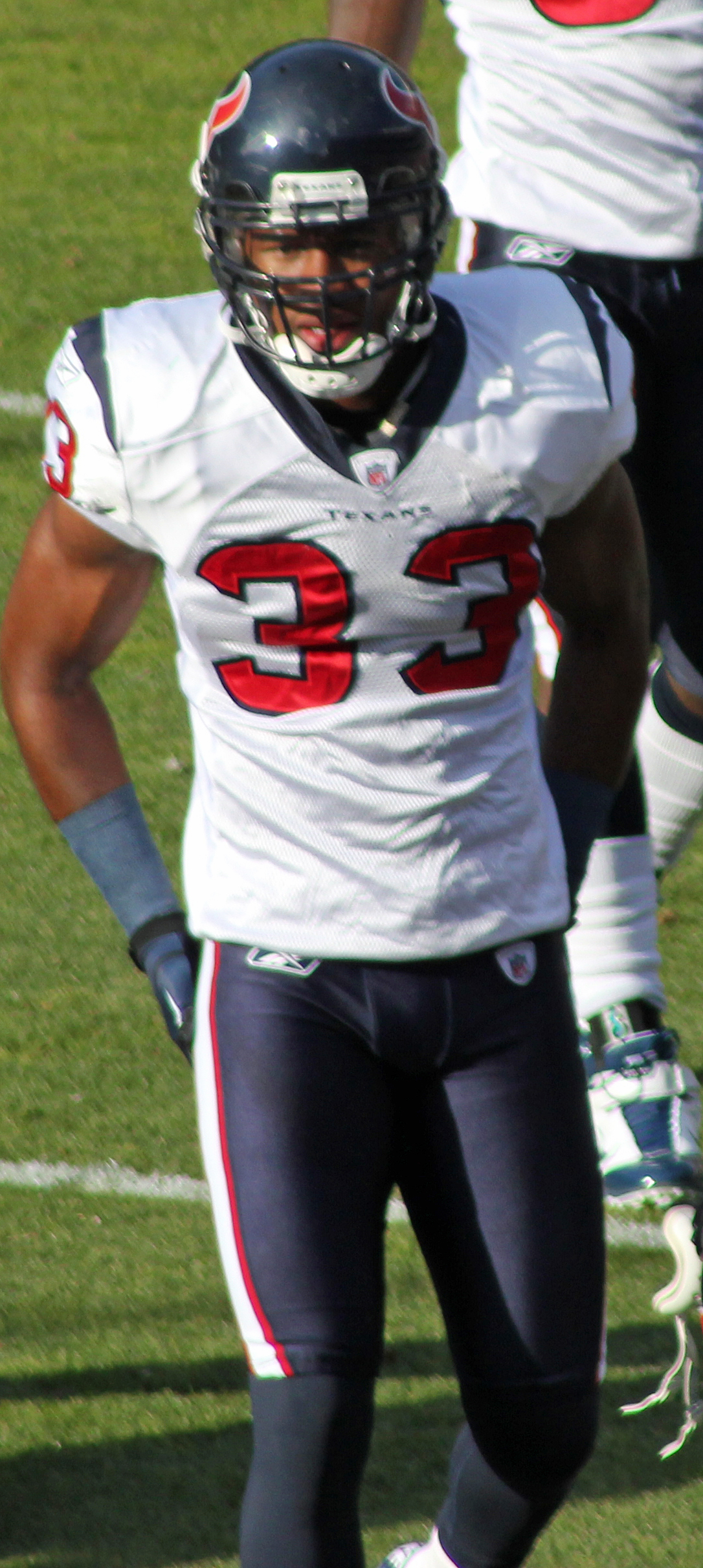
- Nolan with the Houston Texans in 2010

No. 33, 23, 43
- Position: Safety

Personal information
- Born: September 7, 1986 (age 40); Los Angeles, California, U.S.
- Listed height: 6 ft 2 in (1.88 m)
- Listed weight: 202 lb (92 kg)

Career information
- High school: Woodland Hills (CA) El Camino Real
- College: Arizona State
- NFL draft: 2009: 7th round, 223rd overall pick

Career history
- Houston Texans (2009−2011); Miami Dolphins (2012); Houston Texans (2012); Chicago Bears (2012); Tampa Bay Buccaneers (2013)*
- * Offseason or practice squad member only

Awards and highlights
- 2× Second-team All-Pac-10 (2007, 2008)

Career NFL statistics
- Total tackles: 93
- Sacks: 1.5
- Fumble recoveries: 1
- Interceptions: 3
- Stats at Pro Football Reference

Troy Nolan (born September 7, 1986) is an American former professional football player who was a safety in the National Football League (NFL). He played college football for the Arizona State Sun Devils and was selected by the Houston Texans in the seventh round of the 2009 NFL draft.

== Early life ==
Nolan attended El Camino Real High School in Woodland Hills, California. Named first-team All-West Valley Conference on defense in 2003 and second-team on offense. Was the Most Valuable Player of the West Valley Conference in 2003. Named second-team All-West Valley Conference on defense in 2003 and first-team on offense Named the El Camino Real High defensive Player of the Year in football in 2003. Captained the football team in 2003. Lettered in football, basketball, track and field and soccer

== College career ==
=== College of the Canyons ===
Nolan graduated the College of the Canyons in Santa Clarita, California in 2005, which went on to the Junior College National Championship.

=== Arizona State ===
Nolan was forced to redshirt in 2006 after suffering a knee injury in practice with the Arizona State Sun Devils. He returned to the field in 2007, starting all 13 games and leading the team with six interceptions, two of which he returned for a touchdown. Nolan's propensity for making the big play showed up again in 2008, as he intercepted four passes and returned two of them (along with a fumble) to give him five defensive touchdowns in only two seasons of Pac-10 play.

== Professional career ==
=== Pre-draft ===
Nolan ran the 40-yard dash in 4.65 seconds. He had twelve reps in the bench press and had a 31.5-inch vertical leap. He had a broad jump distance of 117 inches, and ran the 3-cone drill in 7.07 seconds. He ran the 20-yard shuttle in 4.3 seconds.

=== Houston Texans ===
Nolan was selected by the Houston Texans in the seventh round of the 2009 NFL draft. He signed a four-year contract with the Texans on June 11. He was waived/injured on August 18 with a wrist injury, and was subsequently placed on injured reserve.

In week 4 of the 2010 NFL season, Nolan made his first career appearance in a regular season game against the Oakland Raiders. He had two interceptions, with the second being a game winner. In week 17, Nolan made his third interception of the season and his first sack.

=== Miami Dolphins ===
On September 1, 2012, he signed with the Miami Dolphins. He was waived by the Dolphins on September 25, 2012.

=== Houston Texans ===
Nolan was re-signed by the Texans on October 2, 2012. He was waived by the Texans on November 17, 2012.

=== Chicago Bears ===
On December 26, 2012, Nolan was signed by the Chicago Bears.

=== Tampa Bay Buccaneers ===
On July 29, 2013, Nolan signed with the Tampa Bay Buccaneers. Nolan was released on August 5, 2013. On August 10, 2013, Nolan was re-signed by the Buccaneers. On August 26, 2013, he was released by the Buccaneers.
