= Karen Dior =

American actor (1967–2004)

- Born: February 14, 1967; St. Louis, Missouri, U.S.
- Died: August 25, 2004 (aged 37); Los Angeles, California
- Other names: Geoffrey Karen Dior, Geoffrey Gann, Geoff Gann, Ricky Van, Rick Van
- Occupations: Actor; singer; director; activist; writer; drag queen

Karen Dior (February 14, 1967 – August 25, 2004) was the stage name of Geoffrey Gann, later known as Geoffrey Karen Dior, an American actor, singer, director, and drag queen.

== Life and career ==
Geoffrey Gann was born in St. Louis, Missouri; he was adopted as an 8-day old into a Southern Baptist family, who named him Jeffrey Gene Gann, and raised him in Ozark. Gann's adoptive father was a Republican State Representative. Gann moved to Los Angeles at the age of 21 and began working in a beauty salon and performing in drag shows in West Hollywood bars. In 1989, he began appearing in bisexual and transgender adult films, in and out of drag. He performed in approximately 120 adult films, most of them under the Dior name. He also performed under the names Geoff Dior, Rick Van, Geoffrey Karen Dior, Geoffrey Gann, and Geoff Gann.

In the 1990s, he debuted in mainstream film and television roles, including a performance as Loni Anderson's stalker in the 1992 TV movie The Price She Paid (credited as Geoff Gann). Other work included guest appearances on the television series Xena: Warrior Princess, Head Over Heels (both credited as Karen Dior), and Veronica's Closet (credited as Geoffrey Karen Dior).

== Later years and death ==
Dior contracted HIV in 1995 and later worked as an AIDS activist. After leaving the adult film industry, Dior wrote and released Sleeping Under the Stars, his first autobiographical work, in 2001. The same year, he released an album (under the name Geoffrey Karen Dior) titled S E X, and he was a member of two bands, the Johnny Depp Clones and Goddess. He also received a PhD in philosophy in religion and became an ordained minister.

On August 25, 2004, Dior died of hepatitis.

== Selected filmography ==
=== Actress ===
- Single White Shemale (1992)
- Mystery Date (1992)
- A River Made to Drown In (1997)
- Xena: Warrior Princess (1 episode, 1997 – "Here She Comes... Miss Amphipolis")
- Head Over Heels (1 episode, 1997)
- Veronica's Closet (1 episode, 1998)
- Double Down (2001)

=== Director ===
- I Dream Of Queenie (1997) "Produced and Directed"
- Genderella (1998)
- Playing the Odds (1998)
- Getting Personal (1999)
- Bi Athletes (2000)
- Bi-Dazzled (2001)
- Leather Temptation (2002)
- Bi-Sluts (2001) "2001 AVN Bisexual Nominated Adult Film"

== Bibliography ==
- Sleeping Under the Stars (2001) ISBN 0-9706956-0-8
