= Imps* =

- Directed by: Scott Mansfield
- Written by: Scott Mansfield
- Produced by: Jere Rae
- Starring: Linda Blair; Colleen Camp; Julia Duffy; Erika Eleniak; Michael McKean; Miguel A. Núñez Jr. Jennifer Tilly; Fred Willard
- Cinematography: Alec Hirschfeld
- Edited by: Stu Eisenberg; Barbara Noble
- Music by: Bill Elliot
- Distributed by: Imps Company; Monterey Media
- Release date: February 10, 2009
- Running time: 78 minutes
- Country: United States
- Language: English

Imps* is an American comedy film filmed in 1983 and released in 2009. It stars an ensemble cast and is divided into several segments. IMPS is an acronym for "Immoral Minority Picture Show".

== Plot ==
The film consists of numerous sketches and parodies, including a competition of pencil sharpening held in Indiana, a music video from the Marquessa de Sade, and a horror heroine.

== Cast ==
- Linda Blair as Jamie
- Colleen Camp as Young Lady
- Julia Duffy as Marjorie
- Erika Eleniak as Brooke
- Michael McKean as Fritz #2
- Georg Stanford Brown as Charlie
- Miguel A. Núñez Jr. as Bopper
- Jennifer Tilly as Joni
- Fred Willard as Dad
- Sybil Danning as Sherry

== Production ==
The film was shot in Los Angeles, California.

== Release ==
It was released on DVD on February 10, 2009.

== Reception ==
John Latchem, writing for Home Media Magazine said, "This artifact from the 1980s serves as a nice time capsule of popular culture from 25 years ago."
