= Richard Portnow =

American actor

- Born: January 26, 1947 (age 79); Crown Heights, Brooklyn, New York, U.S.
- Occupation: Actor
- Years active: 1980–present

Richard Portnow (born January 26, 1947) is an American actor known for such films and television series as Good Morning, Vietnam, Barton Fink, Kindergarten Cop, Man of the House, Sister Act, Seven, Ghost Dog: The Way of the Samurai, Bogus, The Spirit, Law Abiding Citizen, Private Parts, Fallen Arches, Double Down, Poolhall Junkies, The Sopranos, Hannah Montana, The Nanny, Trumbo, Oldboy, Find Me Guilty, Underdogs and Boston Legal.

Portnow played the role of defense attorney Harold "Mel" Melvoin on the Emmy-winning HBO series The Sopranos (1999), the lawyer for Uncle Junior.

== Filmography ==
=== Film ===
Year	Title	Role	Notes
1980	Roadie	First New York Wino	
1985	Desperately Seeking Susan	Party Guest	
1987	Radio Days	Sy	
1987	Tin Men	Carly Benelli	
1987	The Squeeze	Ruben	
1987	Weeds	Guard	
1987	Hiding Out	Mr. Lessig	
1987	Good Morning, Vietnam	Dan 'The Man' Levitan	
1988	In Dangerous Company	Kellog	
1988	Twins	Chop Shop Owner	
1989	Meet the Hollowheads	Mr. Crabneck	
1989	Say Anything...	IRS Agent Stewart	
1989	Chattahoochee	Dr. Debner	
1990	Tune in Tomorrow	Uncle Luke	
1990	Havana	Mike MacClaney	
1990	Kindergarten Cop	Captain Salazar	
1991	Barton Fink	Detective Mastrionotti	
1991	For the Boys	Milt, Recording Studio	
1991	Father of the Bride	Al, The Tux Salesman	
1992	Beethoven	Ammo Gun Salesman	
1992	Sister Act	Willy	
1992	There Goes the Neighborhood	Marty Rollins	
1993	Heart and Souls	Max Marco	
1993	Night Eyes 3	Edgar Kaplan	
1994	Lipstick Camera	Detective Vorkopich	
1994	Trial by Jury	Leo Greco	
1994	S.F.W.	Gerald Parsley	
1994	Across the Moon	Roy	
1995	Man of the House	Joey Renda	
1995	Seven	Dr. Beardsley	
1996	Guy	Al	
1996	Bogus	M. Clay Thrasher	
1996	Brittle Glory	Sid Higgins	
1997	Private Parts	Ben Stern	
1997	Mad City	Brackett's Agent	
1998	Milo	Lieutenant Parker	
1998	Shadow of Doubt	Marvin Helm	
1998	My Giant	Producer	
1998	Fear and Loathing in Las Vegas	Wine Colored Tuxedo	
1998	Postal Worker	Dr. Nicholas Brink	
1999	Road Kill	Charboneau	
1999	Ballad of the Nightingale	Arnie D'Angelo	
1999	Ghost Dog: The Way of the Samurai	Frank 'Handsome Frank'	
1999	Desert Thunder	Admiral Le Clair	
2000	Fallen Arches	Nicky Kaplan	
2000	Happy Accidents	Trip	
2000	Lured Innocence	Jack Shelby	
2000	The Unscarred	Tommy Matolla	
2000	The Mystery of Spoon River	Agent Cicarelli	
2001	Double Down	Arnold Zigman	
2001	Double Bang	Lieutenant Shatkin	
2002	Poolhall Junkies	Jay 'Toupee Jay'	
2004	Tony n' Tina's Wedding	Vinnie Black	
2004	Under the City	Minks	
2005	Meet the Mobsters	Jerry Kaminski	
2006	Find Me Guilty	Max Novardis	
2006	National Lampoon's TV: The Movie	Sergeant	
2007	Perfect Stranger	Narron	
2007	Good Time Max	Head Administrator	
2007	Made in Brooklyn	Louis / Vito Ungaro	
2007	Chasing Robert	Ed Thorton	
2007	The Minis	Jack	
2007	The Indian	Elliot	
2008	Tinker Bell	Minister of Autumn	Direct-to-video
2008	The Spirit	Donenfeld	
2009	Life Is Hot in Cracktown	Guy From 4 K	
2009	Law Abiding Citizen	Bill Reynolds	
2009	Under New Management	Carmello Conforte	
2010	Privileged	Mr. Rothman	Direct-to-video
2010	Killer by Nature	Walter	
2012	Dirty People	Max	
2012	A Night of Nightmares	Cliff Tanner	
2012	Two Jacks	Lorenzo	
2012	Hitchcock	Barney Balaban	
2013	Underdogs	John Handon II	
2013	Slightly Single in L.A.	Older Bar Guy	
2013	A Voice in the Dark	Dr. Levi	
2013	Oldboy	Bernie Sharkey	
2014	The Fourth Noble Truth	Aaron's Lawyer	
2014	This Last Lonely Place	Jason Pure	
2014	Nanny Cam	Detective Jones	
2015	Parallel	Stewart	
2015	Trumbo	Louis B. Mayer	
2016	Soy Nero	Murray, The Garage Owner	
2016	Café Society	Walt	
2017	Swing State	'Shoe' Montgomery	
2017	Andover	Shamus Trout	
2017	The Gliksmans	Tim Neuman	
2017	An American Dog Story	Ripper	Voice
2018	Red Team Go	Pawn Shop Owner	
2018	Higher Power	Charles Margrey	
2018	Frank and Ava	Walter Winchell	
2018	Holly Day	Benny	
2019	Stakeout	Pat Reed	
2019	Duke	Carroll Green	
2021	Roe v. Wade	William O. Douglas	
2021	GodHead: In a fiction, in a dream of passion	Martin	

=== Television ===
Year	Title	Role	Notes
1983	Trackdown: Finding the Goodbar Killer	Bartender	Television film
1985–1986	The Equalizer	3 roles Lieutenant (S1.E4); Police Lieutenant (S1.E11); Policeman/Detective (S1.E15)	3 episodes "The Lock Box" (S1.E4) "Desperately" (S1.E11) "Dead Drop" (S1.E15)
1986	Courage	Frankie Ce De Baca	Television film
1987	Tales from the Darkside	Curtis	Episode: "Everybody Needs a Little Love"
1987	Almost Partners	Nicky	Television film
1987	American Playhouse	Billy Einhorn	Episode: "The House of Blue Leaves"
1987	Perry Mason: The Case of the Murdered Madam	Harry Long	Television film
1987	The Oldest Rookie	Albert Moont	Episode: "Ike and Son"
1987	Hooperman	Mr. Byrne	Episode: "Hot Wired"
1987	Beauty and the Beast	Naj	Episode: "A Children's Story"
1988	Wiseguy	Louis Cabra	Episode: "Blood Dance"
1988	Dear John	Harry	Episode: "Pilot"
1988	Something Is Out There	Jimmy 'Blue Eyes', Eddie's Ex-Boss	Episode: "Gladiator"
1989	Original Sin	Vincent	Television film
1989	A Deadly Silence	District Attorney Ed Jablonski	Television film
1989	Peter Gunn	Spiros	Television film
1990	Singer & Sons	Maurice	Episode: "Our's Not to Reason Why Shmy"
1990	Father Dowling Mysteries	Cameron Prince	Episode: "The Movie Mystery"
1991	Perry Mason: The Case of the Maligned Mobster	Dave Barrett	Television film
1991	The New WKRP in Cincinnati	Cleeve Peevey	Episode: "Every Move a Work of Art"
1991–1992	Dinosaurs	Mel Luster	2 episodes
1991–1995	Murder, She Wrote	Walter Pell / Lieutenant Walt Murphy	2 episodes
1992	Middle Ages	Buddy	Episode: "The Pig in the Python"
1992	Civil Wars	Jerry DeSantos	Episode: "The Naked and the Wed"
1992	Homefront	Actor / Announcer	Episode: "The Lemo Tomato Juice Hour"
1993	Seinfeld	Ray	Episode: "The Handicap Spot"
1993	Based on an Untrue Story	Disturbing Caller	Television film
1993	Home Free	Vic	13 episodes
1994	The Commish	Benny	Episode: "Benny"
1994	Dragstrip Girl	Detective Dryden	Television film
1994	The Nanny	Phillipe	Episode: "A Star Is Unborn"
1995	Double Rush	Ed Foley	2 episodes
1995	Ed McBain's 87th Precinct: Lightning	Monaghan	Television film
1995	Lois & Clark: The New Adventures of Superman	Barry Barker	Episode: "Whine, Whine, Whine"
1995	Indictment: The McMartin Trial	Judge George	Television film
1995	Fallen Angels	Jack Malkov	Episode: "A Dime a Dance"
1995	Donor Unknown	Hal Cooney	Television film
1995-2005	NYPD Blue	Howard Segal / Harry Bernstein	2 episodes
1996	Dave's World	Leon	Episode: "Loves Me Like a Rock"
1996	Dream On	Roy	Episode: "Finale - Part One"
1996-1997	Mad About You	Arthur	2 episodes
1996–1997	EZ Streets	Detective Frank Collero	10 episodes
1997	Walker, Texas Ranger	Irving Rothbart, LaRue's Attorney	Episode: "Trial of LaRue"
1997	JAG	Sibby Lonegro	Episode: "Ghost Ship"
1997	Bella Mafia	Anthony Moreno	Television film
1998	Spin City	Mr. Paterno	Episode: "Deaf Man Walking"
1999	Boy Meets World	Stan	Episode: "Can I Help to Cheer You?"
1999	The Substitute 3: Winner Takes All	Vincent Lo Russo	Television film
1999	Witness Protection	Nikos 'The Greek' Stephanos	Television film
1999	Ryan Caulfield: Year One	Sergeant Palermo	2 episodes
1999	Kilroy	Ed Gray	Television film
1999–2004	The Sopranos	Harold 'Mel' Melvoin	13 episodes
2000	18 Wheels of Justice	Anthony Guardino Jr.	Episode: "Two Eyes for an Eye"
2000	Judging Amy	Assistant Attorney General Charles Novotny	Episode: "The Out-of-Towners"
2001	Laughter on the 23rd Floor	Harry Prince	Television film
2001	Going to California	Lou Barlow	Episode: "The Naked and the Nude"
2002	The Shield	Jim Wright	Episode: "Cherrypoppers"
2004–2006	Boston Legal	Judge Peter Harding	4 episodes
2004–2009	Nip/Tuck	Manny Caldarello	2 episodes
2005	Trump Unauthorized	Ed Koch	Television film
2005	Head Cases	Max	Episode: "In the Club"
2005	Las Vegas	Lester Colette	Episode: "Everything Old Is You Again"
2006	Hannah Montana	Marty Kline	Episode: "On the Road Again"
2007	Dirt	Teddy Jick	Episode: "Ovophagy"
2008	Cold Case	Oscar Anderson	Episode: "The Dealer"
2010	How to Make It in America	Ben's Father	Episode: "Paper, Denim + Dollars"
2010	The Wish List	Lenny	Television film
2010	Jack's Family Adventure	Denny Simpkins	Television film
2010	Outlaw	Senator Sidney Vidalin	3 episodes
2011	The Mentalist	Phil	Episode: "Scarlet Ribbons"
2011	The Christmas Pageant	Leo Brenner	Television film
2012	CSI: NY	Preston Seville Sr.	Episode: "Brooklyn Til I Die"
2012	Hawaii Five-0	Creed's Attorney	Episode: "Kupale"
2012	Imaginary Friend	Dan	Television film
2012	Franklin & Bash	Richard Kohl	Episode: "For Those About to Rock"
2014	Castle	Milt Boyle	Episode: "That '70s Show"
2014	Parks and Recreation	Mitch Savner	3 episodes
2014	Suits	Pete Kreeling	Episode: "Breakfast, Lunch and Dinner"
2014	Seasons of Love	Pop	Television film
2015	Grimm	Daniel Troyer	Episode: "Maiden Quest"
2015	The Good Wife	Judge Ben Margovski	Episode: "Restraint"
2016	Elementary	Eddie Eichorn	Episode: "You've Got Me, Who's Got You?"
2017	Timeless	William Hale Thompson	Episode: "Public Enemy No. 1"
2017	Major Crimes	The Gardener	Episode: "Dead Drop"
2017	Real Rob	Jerry	Episode: "Acupuncture & Spring Rolls"
2019	The Detour	Marty	Episode: "The Return"
2020	Grey's Anatomy	Saul Schmitt	Episode: "The Last Supper"
2021	Shameless	Johnny 'Boxcars'	Episode: "Survivors"

=== Video games ===
Year	Title	Role	Notes
2003	X2: Wolverine's Revenge	Beast	Voice
