= Panic in the Park =

1995 video game

- Developer: Imagination Pilots
- Publisher: WarnerActive
- Director: Ken Berris
- Producer: Phil Davis
- Designer: Howard A. Tullman
- Programmer: Pierre Maloka
- Writer: Howard A. Tullman
- Composers: Paul Libman, Joel Fox
- Platform: Windows 3.x
- Release: September 1995
- Genre: Adventure
- Mode: Single-player

Panic in the Park is an interactive movie adventure video game developed by Imagination Pilots in and published by WarnerActive in 1995. The game stars Erika Eleniak as both Jamie and Janie in the game and Michael Clarke Duncan as a security guard. There are around 30 actors in the cast. A Macintosh port of the game was planned, but never came to be.

== Gameplay ==
The game was stored in three separate CDs. The gameplay shares many puzzle elements and first-person gameplay to Myst. When the player clicks the cursor on where the mouse icon changes to a triforce icon, the location changes. Clicking on an object allows the player to get a closer look. The player's main objective is to collect four special coins to use at the Oracle booth before proceeding to the office building to locate the deed. The fairground is divided into four sections. In each section there are some playable minigames. Playing the minigames costs a few tokens. Jamie starts the player off with ten tokens. Winning the minigames earns the player additional tokens depending on the winning score. At least one minigame in each fairground section earns the player a special coin. After solving the puzzles in the park's office building, the player must use whatever clues gathered to find out which one of nine park employees is the thief who stole the deed.

== Plot ==
Skyview Park was a successful amusement park with great popularity, until numerous mishaps occurred. The city is on the verge of closing down the park. Jamie, who has inherited the park, struggles to keep her evil identical twin sister Janie from demolishing it into a parking lot. After a dispute at court, the judge gives Jamie until morning to present evidence that she owns the park. The player as a journalist is sent on an assignment to get all the facts and steps forth to help Jamie find the Skyview deed and unmask the thief that stole it before the night is over.

== Reception ==
Reception

Review score
Publication	Score
Electronic Entertainment	4/5

Awards
Publication	Award
International Interactive Communications Society	1995 Interactive Summit Award
Adweek Magazine	1996 Icon Award (Gold)

Newsday praised the game for "laugh out loud funny" dialogue, acting and sophisticated cinematic elements.
