= Things You Can Tell Just by Looking at Her =

2000 American romantic drama film

- Theatrical release poster
- Directed by: Rodrigo García
- Written by: Rodrigo García
- Produced by: Jon Avnet; Lisa Lindstrom; Marsha Oglesby
- Starring: Glenn Close; Cameron Diaz; Calista Flockhart; Kathy Baker; Amy Brenneman; Holly Hunter
- Cinematography: Emmanuel Lubezki
- Edited by: Amy E. Duddleston
- Music by: Edward Shearmur
- Production company: Franchise Pictures LLC
- Distributed by: United Artists (through MGM Distribution Co.)
- Release dates: January 22, 2000 (Sundance); March 11, 2001 (Showtime)
- Running time: 109 minutes
- Country: United States
- Language: English
- Budget: $2 million

Things You Can Tell Just by Looking at Her is a 2000 American romantic drama film written and directed by Rodrigo García and starring an ensemble cast. The film consists of five stories, or vignettes, all centering on women and loosely tied together to examine themes of loneliness, dissatisfaction, longing, and/or desire.

The film, García's directing debut, was shown at the 2000 Cannes Film Festival and won the Un Certain Regard Award. Though the film was originally intended as a theatrical release, its distributor MGM sold the film to Showtime, where it premiered on March 11, 2001.

Holly Hunter was nominated for the Emmy Award for Outstanding Supporting Actress for her performance.

== Plot ==
In the San Fernando Valley, Kathy—a police detective—and her partner are investigating the apparent suicide of an unknown woman. Dr. Keener, a middle-aged doctor, attempts to care for her aging mother while coping with her own loneliness. She avoids intimacy, but also longs for it; we see both frustration and anticipation as she waits for phone calls from male colleagues. Dr. Keener decides to seek comfort or escape in Christine, who reads tarot cards. Christine's lesbian partner Lilly is critically ill with an unnamed disease, possibly cancer.

Rebecca is a successful bank manager who's "not big on regrets". After a three-year involvement with married Robert, she becomes pregnant. Before Rebecca visits Dr. Keener to get an abortion, she has a fling with Walter, a subordinate.

Rose is a single mother who is writing children's books. She develops a sweet crush on a new little-person neighbor, who catches Rose spying on him. Rose later experiences the shock of learning about her son's extensive sexual activity.

Kathy's sister, Carol Faber, is a lovely blind woman who has an active social life. Kathy is attracted to the medical examiner in the suicide case, and her story ends with him taking her out on a date. In an epilogue, Dr. Keener drops into a bar, where she meets the male character, Walter, from the previous stories (possibly the younger male alluded to in Christine's tarot card reading).

Carmen is a woman who appears in five scenes in the five different stories. The first is walking past Dr. Keener's house, another is walking beside Rebecca, a third time is in the grocery store while Rose is shopping, the fourth time is walking past Christine's apartment building at night as Christine looks down from her balcony, and the final time is the post mortem examination by detective Kathy alongside Dr. Sam. Carol's imaginative story towards the end of the film helps explain the instances throughout the movie where she appears. According to Carol, she was back in town to reconnect with her ex, whom she had been talking to for months until her move back to Los Angeles. In each scene, she is, as Carol deduces, preparing for the big date with her ex. In the first scene she is in, she is probably looking for a place to rent; in the second, she is seen carrying her ill-fated red dress; the third has her shopping for toiletries; in the fourth she is walking back to her place, looking visibly heartbroken, and the final scene in the coroners lab echoes the beginning of the film, where she is found dead. Carol's story ends with what Kathy already concluded: she had resorted to suicide because of her grief over a love she, as Carol claims, could not revive, like the baby she had lost many years before.

== Cast ==
- Glenn Close as Dr. Elaine Keener
- Cameron Diaz as Carol Faber
- Calista Flockhart as Christine Taylor
- Kathy Baker as Rose
- Amy Brenneman as Detective Kathy Faber
- Valeria Golino as Lilly
- Holly Hunter as Rebecca Waynon
- Matt Craven as Walter
- Gregory Hines as Robert
- Miguel Sandoval as Sam
- Noah Fleiss as Jay
- Danny Woodburn as Albert
- Penelope Allen as Nancy
- Roma Maffia as Debbie
- Mika Boorem as June

== Production ==
Rodrigo García first wrote script for the film in 1997 and then workshopped it at the 1999 Sundance Institute's Writers and Filmmakers Lab. It was at the Institute that García met actor Kathy Baker and director Jon Avnet. Avnet got the script to Glenn Close and Holly Hunter; within months, all three actors signed on.

In one scene, the Carol character reads the novel One Hundred Years of Solitude in Braille, an homage to García's father Gabriel García Márquez.

Effie T. Brown was the film's line producer. Joel A. Miller was the set dresser for the film.

== Reception ==
=== Release ===
The film premiered at the 2000 Sundance Film Festival to critical acclaim, and went on to screen at the Cannes Film Festival that May.

A theatrical release was said to be planned by MGM Distribution Co., but the company concluded that Sundance and Cannes acclaim did not justify a theater run and the film would fare better on Showtime. Critics and film festival directors criticized MGM for its handling of the film, arguing the company neglected to capitalize on the film's momentum on the festival circuit. The film premiered on Showtime on March 11, 2001.

In Spain, the film opened on 52 screens on May 26, 2002. In its opening weekend, the film made €201,200. Its total gross in Spain was over €1,595,755.

=== Critical reception ===
On review aggregate website Rotten Tomatoes, Things You Can Tell Just by Looking at Her has an approval rating of 80% based on 20 reviews. On Metacritic, it has a score of 76 based on 9 critics' reviews.

Todd McCarthy of Variety said the film marks a promising debut for García and called it an "observant, emotionally acute drama...distinguished by a pronounced poetic sensibility in its writing and visual style." The film drew comparisons to similar movies like Magnolia and Short Cuts, with its exclusive focus on female characters noted.

Writing for Salon, Stephanie Zacharek said "the beautifully conceived script gives [the actors] plenty to work with." Adding "every actress here glows", she described Close as "heartbreaking", Diaz as bringing "wisecracking aplomb" to her role, and Flockhart "suggesting a wealth of iron reserve beneath [her] frailty". Of Hunter, Zacharek wrote she "has that rare blend of intuitiveness and intelligence; you feel she's appraising the world every minute, just waiting for it to disappoint her, only to find that she's not quite sure what to do when she realizes she has disappointed herself." Zacharek concluded that though the film has been described by industry figures as too "small" of a picture for theaters, it is "still as big as life."

=== Accolades ===
At the 2000 Cannes Film Festival, the film was honored with the Prize Un Certain Regard.

Holly Hunter was nominated for the Emmy Award for Outstanding Supporting Actress at the 53rd Primetime Emmy Awards.
