= Girl in the Cadillac =

1995 American film

- Directed by: Lucas Platt
- Written by: John Warren
- Based on: The Enchanted Isle by James M. Cain
- Produced by: Thomas Baer
- Starring: Erika Eleniak; William McNamara; Michael Lerner; Bud Cort; Valerie Perrine; William Shockley
- Cinematography: Nancy Schreiber
- Edited by: Norman Hollyn
- Music by: Anton Sanko
- Distributed by: Columbia Tristar Home Video (VHS); Showcase Entertainment (International)
- Release date: July 21, 1995
- Running time: 89 minutes
- Country: United States
- Language: English

Girl in the Cadillac is a 1995 American crime-drama film with Erika Eleniak and William McNamara.

== Plot ==
A woman called Mandy runs away from her home. At a bus station she meets Rick, who takes her with him to a rendezvous with a pair of bank robbers. After listening to their plan, Mandy agrees to drive the getaway car for $5,000, when they convince her everything will go smoothly. However, the robbery goes awry resulting in several bank employees killed, and Mandy flees with Rick and $75,000. As a result, she is chased by the police and the other two robbers. During their escape, Mandy and Rick buy a red Cadillac convertible. Ultimately, she decides she wants to give the money back, but Rick disagrees.

== Filming ==
The film was shot in locations in Bakersfield and Los Angeles, California, and Corpus Christi, Texas.

== Cast ==
- Erika Eleniak as Mandy
- William McNamara as Rick
- Michael Lerner as Pal
- Bud Cort as Bud
- Valerie Perrine as Tilly
- William Shockley as Lamar
- Leland Orser as Used car salesman
