= Cradle 2 the Grave =

2003 film by Andrzej Bartkowiak

- Theatrical release poster
- Directed by: Andrzej Bartkowiak
- Screenplay by: John O'Brien; Channing Gibson
- Story by: John O'Brien
- Produced by: Joel Silver
- Starring: Jet Li; DMX; Anthony Anderson; Kelly Hu; Tom Arnold; Mark Dacascos; Gabrielle Union
- Cinematography: Daryn Okada
- Edited by: Derek Brechin
- Music by: John Frizzell; Damon "Grease" Blackman
- Production company: Silver Pictures
- Distributed by: Warner Bros. Pictures
- Release date: February 28, 2003
- Running time: 101 minutes
- Country: United States
- Languages: English; Mandarin; Korean
- Budget: $25 million
- Box office: $56.5 million

Cradle 2 the Grave is a 2003 American action film directed by Andrzej Bartkowiak, and produced by Joel Silver. The film stars Jet Li, DMX, Gabrielle Union, Mark Dacascos, Kelly Hu, Anthony Anderson, and Tom Arnold. The film revolves around Anthony Fait (DMX), a skilled jewel thief, and Su (Li), a Taiwanese intelligence agent, as they team up together to navigate the underworld of Los Angeles to rescue the former's daughter from the ruthless crime lord Ling (Dacascos) by executing a series of heists.

It is the third of three films directed by Bartkowiak, produced by Silver, and starring DMX and Anthony Anderson that focus on martial arts-based action in an urban setting with a hip-hop soundtrack, following Romeo Must Die (2000) and Exit Wounds (2001). The three films feature many of the same cast, key crew, and locations.

The film was released in the United States on February 28, 2003. Despite receiving generally negative critic reviews, it grossed $56 million worldwide, making it a modest success.

== Plot ==
Anthony Fait and his crew (Daria, Tommy, and Miles) of thieves attempt to steal diamonds for a Frenchman named Christophe, who serves as the middleman for a mysterious employer. When Fait contacts Christophe, a Taiwanese intelligence agent named Su intercepts the conversation and attempts to identify the criminals.

While the crew gathers up as many diamonds as they can, including a bag of black diamonds, Agent Su calls Fait and demands that he and his crew leave the diamonds in the vault, warning him that the police are on the way. However, Fait ignores this warning, and the criminals attempt a daring escape past a SWAT team blockade. While Fait and his crew all manage to escape, Agent Su fights Miles and recovers Miles' share of the diamonds. Su is disappointed to find that Miles does not have the black diamonds though. Meanwhile, Fait asks his friend Archie to appraise the black diamonds he had stolen. Arriving at the San Francisco International Airport, Christophe's mysterious employer, Ling, is informed by his assistant Sona, that Christophe has been attacked and that Fait and his gang have taken the black diamonds.

Later that night, Fait runs into Su. During this inadvertent meeting, Fait receives a phone call from Ling, who demands that Fait hand over the black diamonds. Fait refuses and is subsequently attacked by two of Ling's henchman. With Su's help, he defeats them and escapes. After the fight, Archie tells Fait that some gangsters came to his workshop and demanded the black diamonds as well. After some hesitation, Archie admits that he gave the stones to the gangsters to spare his own life. Fait also receives another call from Ling, who has kidnapped Fait's daughter, Vanessa, to persuade Fait to give up the diamonds. Now with a common enemy, Fait and Su team up to recover the diamonds from the gangsters and rescue Vanessa from Ling.

Fait visits jailed crime lord "Jump" Chambers, most likely the employer of the gangsters who had robbed Archie. When Chambers refuses to cooperate, Fait goes to Chambers' night club, hoping to find the stones somewhere in his office. The plan goes awry, and Fait and the gang have to leave empty-handed. Meanwhile, Su and Archie go to an underground club to try to find the gangsters who attacked Archie. Because the club does not allow guests, Su is forced to enter as a fighter in the club's fighting ring. During Su's fight, Archie sees the man they are looking for, recognizing the man's ring. Through this informant, they learn that the diamonds are hidden in the bubble bath in Chamber's office. When they return to the nightclub to retrieve the diamonds, they find that Ling's men have already taken the stones. Meanwhile, while locked in a van, Vanessa, who has been bound and gagged with duct tape frees herself and finds a cell phone to call Fait. Just before the phone's battery runs out, Vanessa gives some clues as to her location. With these clues, the gang surmises that Vanessa is being held in an airport hangar.

Realizing that Ling will want to auction off the stones, which are actually weapons of mass destruction, the group searches flight schedules to find an airport where a large number of private flights will be landing that night. Finding the right airport, the group races to the hangar. While driving to the hangar Fait learns from Su that he and Ling are former childhood best friends, that they both joined the government at the same time, but Ling's greed led him to take out their entire task team, but Su escaped. The group arrives at the airfield, where Ling's auction is already starting. A fight ensues, and Fait and his crew take out members of Ling's team, while Su battles Ling in a one-on-one fight, where Ling is killed after Su forces him to swallow a capsule of synthetic plutonium and then breaks the capsule lodged in his neck. Eventually, Vanessa is rescued, and when the police arrive, Fait promises to end his criminal career in order to lead a safe and happy life with Vanessa.

== Cast ==
- Jet Li as Su Duncan
- DMX as Anthony Fait
- Gabrielle Union as Daria
- Mark Dacascos as Ling
- Kelly Hu as Sona
- Melvin Smalls as Miles
- Anthony Anderson as Tommy
- Tom Arnold as Archie
- Paige Hurd as Vanessa Fait
- Paolo Seganti as Christophe
- Michael Jace as Odion
- Ron Yuan as Laser Tech
- Chi McBride as "Jump" Chambers
- Sean Cory as Willy "Chickens"

Additionally, Daniel Dae Kim appears, consult as the Visiting Expert. Johnny Trí Nguyễn and Marcus Young appear as Ling's hitmen. Tito Ortiz, Héctor Echavarría, Chuck Liddell, Arnold Chon and Garrett Warren appear as cage fighters. The arms dealers were respectively portrayed by Doug Spearman (African), Hani Naimi (Egyptian), Julie du Page (French), Hari Dhillon (Pakistani) and Peter J. Lucas (Russian). Other roles include Randy Couture as the Fight Club Fighter #8; Lester Speight as the doorman of Chamber's club, Martin Klebba as the fight club's announcer; Woon Young Park as a bald enforcer; and Larry Joshua as a police officer in the vault. Uncredited roles include William L. Johnson as the armored truck driver; Kevin Grevioux as a prison guard; Nikki Martin and Ungenita Prevost as the ring girls; and Natasha Yi as a club girl.

== Production ==
Filming began on March 11, 2002, and ended in the summer of that year, taking place in various areas of Los Angeles, California. The freestyle fight in which Su faces 15 combatants in a cage covered by a cyclone fence and surrounded by an angry and bloodthirsty crowd, took 10 days to film.

== Reception ==
The movie received generally negative reviews. On the review aggregator website Rotten Tomatoes, the film holds a 27% approval rating based on 124 reviews, with an average rating of 4.6/10. The website's consensus reads, "Dumb and by-the-numbers, but serviceable." Metacritic gives the film a rating of 36 out of 100, based on 26 reviews.

In a one out of four review, Ed Gonzalez of Slant Magazine stated that "Jet Li and DMX duke it out with an assortment of thugs as if they were slowly making their way to the final stage of Super Mario Bros.."

== Box office ==
The film debuted at number one at the North American box office, grossing $16,521,468 in its opening weekend. However, this accounted for a hefty 47.6% of its total $34,712,347 gross. The film's worldwide gross stands at $56,489,558, making the film a modest success.

== Soundtrack ==
Year	Album	Peak chart positions		Certifications
Year	Album	U.S.	U.S. R&B	Certifications
2003	Cradle 2 the Grave: Released: February 18, 2003; Label: Def Jam	6	3	RIAA: Gold; MC: Gold

== See also ==
- Jet Li filmography
