= Snowbound (2001 film) =

2001 film by Ruben Preuss

- Directed by: Ruben Preuss
- Written by: George Ferris
- Starring: Erika Eleniak; Monika Schnarre; Peter Dobson
- Cinematography: Brian Whittred
- Edited by: Paul Mortimer
- Music by: Ron Sures
- Distributed by: Buena Vista Pictures
- Release date: December 10, 2001
- Running time: 93 minutes
- Country: United States
- Language: English

Snowbound is a 2001 thriller film directed by Ruben Preuss and starring Erika Eleniak, Monika Schnarre, and Peter Dobson.

== Cast ==
- Erika Eleniak as Barbara Cates
- Monika Schnarre as Liz Garnett
- Peter Dobson as Gunnar Davis
