= Julie du Page =

French actress and model (born 1973)

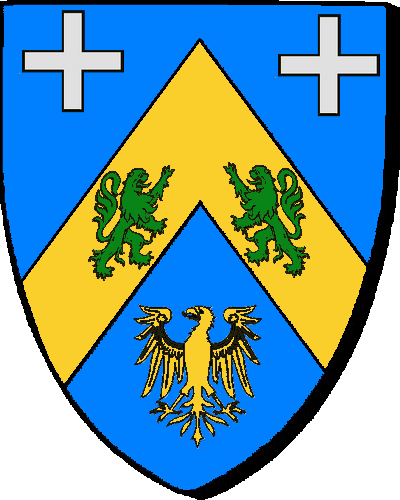
- Pichard du Page coat of arms
- Born: Julie Estelle Andrée Christiane Pichard du Page; October 6, 1973 (age 52); 16th arrondissement of Paris, Paris, France
- Occupations: Film/television actress; model
- Years active: 1992–present
- Known for: Cradle 2 the Grave; Betrayal
- Height: 5 ft 7 in (1.70 m)
- Website: juliedupage.com

Julie Estelle Andrée Christiane Pichard du Page (born 6 October 1973) is a French and Canadian actress and model.

== Life and career ==
Du Page was born in the 16th arrondissement of Paris into a family of French nobility but spent the most of her life in Montreal, Quebec, Canada, later moving back to Paris to pursue her acting career.

Married to Andrew Lapierre at Old Montreal on 17 April 2004, she is the mother of singer-songwriter Billie du Page, born in 2004, who emerged with the 2024 single "Fake Friends." She is also the mother of Augustin, born on 26 March 2007.

== Filmography ==
- Scoop (unknown episodes, 1992) .... Sophie / Carla
- Au nom du père et du fils (unknown episodes, 1993) .... Léonie Lafresnière (25 years old)
- Monsieur Ripois (1993) (TV) .... Nancy
- Highlander (1 episode, "Warmonger", 1994) .... Nicole
- L'ours en peluche (1994) ....
- Extrême limite (42 episodes, 1994–1995) .... Juliette
- The Hardy Boys (1 episode, "No Dice", 1995) .... Jeanette Nordeau
- Les steenfort, maîtres de l'orge (1996) TV mini-series .... Adrienne
- Le jour et la nuit (1997) .... Norma
- Hors limites (2 episodes, "Le piège" and "Mariages à la bulgare", 1997) .... Juliette Renaud
- Les cordier, juge et flic (1 episode, "L'étoile filante", 1998) .... Marie-Sophie Maurin
- H (1 episode, "Un mensonge", 1998) .... Corinne
- Jusqu'à ce que la mort nous sépare (1999) (TV) .... Nathalie
- Les boeuf-carottes (2 episodes, "Haute voltige" and "La fée du logis", 1999–2000) .... Sylvie Kaan
- Sous le soleil (4 episodes, "Autorité parentale", "L'une ou l'autre", "Le choix de Victoria" and "L'accident", 2000) ....
- On n'est pas là pour s'aimer (2000) (TV) .... Carole
- Hautes fréquences (2001) (TV) .... Julie
- The Race (2002) .... Cécilia Gautier, la journaliste
- Cradle 2 the Grave (2003) .... French Buyer
- Betrayal (2003) .... Jayne Ferré
- Lance et compte: La reconquête (unknown episodes, 2004) .... Valérie Nantel
- Life with My Father (La Vie avec mon père) (2005) .... Macha
- Lance et compte: La revanche (unknown episodes, 2006) .... Valérie
- Twice Upon a Time (2006) .... Isabelle Carrington
- Transit (2008) .... Julie
- Je me souviens (2009) .... Marguerite Karsh
- C.A. (1 episode, "Épilogue", 2010) .... Sonia
- Coteau rouge (2011) .... Mariette
- Les Invisibles (2019) (TV) .... Emmanuelle Dumont
- 5e Rang (2019-2020) (TV) .... Sophie
- Alertes (1 episode, 2025) .... Tania Gavras
