= Los Angeles Modern Auctions =

American modern art auction house

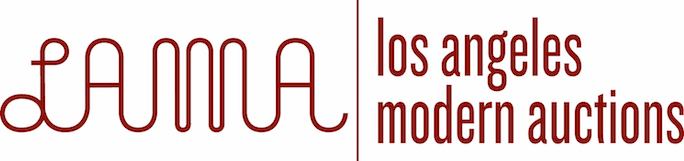
- Type: Auction house
- Industry: Fine Art & Design Auction House
- Founded: January 01, 1992
- Founder: Peter Loughrey
- Headquarters: Van Nuys, California
- Owner: Peter & Shannon Loughrey
- Website: www.lamodern.com

Los Angeles Modern Auctions (LAMA) is the first auction house to specialize in 20th century Modern art and design. Founded by Peter Loughrey in 1992, LAMA especially champions Modern and Contemporary works by California and West Coast artists and designers.

Auctions are held throughout the year in Hollywood, California, and feature a wide range of material including painting, photography, prints, sculpture, ceramics, furniture, jewelry, and lighting. Since LAMA's first auction on October 10, 1992, the boutique auction house has carved a niche in the international market with milestone auctions dedicated to individual designers Charles and Ray Eames, Paul Laszlo, and R.M. Schindler, among others. LAMA has set dozens of world auction records, including many for works by California artists and designers such as Peter Alexander, Ruth Asawa, Larry Bell, Chris Burden, Jay DeFeo, Lorser Feitelson, Mike Kelley, Vasa Mihich, Ken Price, Ed Ruscha, and De Wain Valentine.

== History ==
=== 1990s ===
In October 1989, Peter Loughrey opened vintage furniture gallery Bedrock on La Brea Boulevard. Three years later, Loughrey founded Los Angeles Modern Auctions (LAMA) and hosted the company's first auction on October 10, 1992. The inaugural auction featured 136 lots of Modern design, including works by Harry Bertoia, Charles and Ray Eames, Frank Gehry, Frank Lloyd Wright, Ludwig Mies van der Rohe, Peter Max, Isamu Noguchi, and Ettore Sottsass.

In 1993, Loughrey closed his gallery and landed in London to earn a degree in contemporary works of art through the Sotheby's Institute of Art. As a student, he apprenticed in the Vintage Automobile Department and worked as a porter in the landmark Man Ray auction at Sotheby's, London.

In 1995, Loughrey married Shannon Carragher and, together, they re-opened Los Angeles Modern Auctions. The Loughreys conducted their first joint auction at the Eric Owen Moss 'Samitaur' building in Culver City, California, on May 18, 1996. Their following auction was held five months later on October 27, 1996, at the IM Chait Gallery in Beverly Hills.

Having built a reputation for expertise in the field of Modernist design, LAMA was chosen to liquidate the Silver Lake architectural offices of Richard Neutra. The auction house also acquired more than 500 Eames leg splints from an army surplus, which they sold at the gift shops at the Museum of Modern Art in New York and the Museum of Contemporary Art in Los Angeles.

1998 was a pivotal year for LAMA. It was featured in Wendy Moonan's New York Times article on the antiques market, in which she stated, "The definition of antiques is changing daily, and, as usual, Los Angeles sets the trends." In February of that year, LAMA launched its website, bringing broader visibility to the company. To cap off an already important year, Peter Loughrey was invited by Echoes Magazine to interview Pierre Koenig, the architect best known for his work on the famed Case Study Houses.

By 1999, LAMA had established itself as an important player in the Modern art and design markets. “Modern Monthly” auctions were held with the average lot selling for less than $500 in a bid to reach young collectors through accessible prices. LAMA was commissioned by ARCO (Atlantic Ritchfield Corporation) to liquidate the company's corporate fine art collection — the first major fine art commission for the auction house. The same year, LAMA achieved a world record for any design by Charles Eames when the “Conversation” prototype, a 1941 collaboration with Eero Saarinen, realized $129,000.

=== 2000 to 2010 ===
After achieving the world record for an Eames design in 1999, LAMA was given the opportunity was chosen by John & Marilyn Neuhart to auction works from their private collection in July 2000 – the first single-owner auction dedicated to the works of Charles and Ray Eames. On offer were custom designs, sculptures, photographs, drawings, and ephemera by the Eameses curated by the Neuharts, who worked in the Eames Office and authored Eames Design: The Work of the Office of Charles and Ray Eames. Also included was a selection of rare examples by the designer including "DCW" prototypes – many of which are in permanent collections in public institutions.

Acknowledging LAMA's swift ascent, Loughrey was included that year in Art & Auction's Power Issue.

In 2002, during the Loughreys’ tenure directing Butterfield and Butterfield's 20th Century Decorative Arts and Design department, Playboy Enterprises selected Loughrey to conduct the first-ever auction of items from the magazine's archives, including fine art, photography, sculpture, drawings, and ephemera. That year, LAMA also organized the first auction dedicated to the collection of Michael and Gabrielle Boyd.

In 2003, Peter Loughrey joined PBS's Antiques Roadshow as an appraiser and continued to be featured on the program today until his passing in 2020.

LAMA achieved two more world auction records in 2004, when works by George Nakashima sold for more than $100,000 — Nakashima remains a consistently featured LAMA artist today. The same year, ACME Gallery in Los Angeles asked Loughrey to co-curate Gio Ponti: Furnished Settings & Figuration. Works by Italian designer, architect and artist Ponti continue to be regularly presented at LAMA sales.

Loughrey also worked with ACME to co-curate another show in 2005, Dutch Design. In May of that year, LAMA was the exclusive auctioneer of the entire contents of the Paul Laszlo-designed Hudspeth Residence. This was the largest and most comprehensive Laszlo commission to ever surface for sale at auction at one time.

LAMA established a new world record price for Marilyn (#28) by Andy Warhol at its June 3, 2007 Modern Art & Design Auction, where the work realized $144,000. Shortly after, Judy Chicago's Car Hood realized $288,000.

In 2008, LAMA conducted its first house sale, auctioning the entire contents of the Linda Sullivan collection. This same year, LAMA was featured in Forbes' SOLD!, and, in October, the Loughreys left their West Hollywood location for LAMA's current showroom in Van Nuys, California. The space was formerly home to Stan Winston Studio and features a skylight added to accommodate the construction of the tyrannosaurus Rex for the film Jurassic Park.

=== 2010 to 2020 ===
LAMA celebrated its 25th anniversary with its October 22, 2017 Modern Art & Design Auction; the Top Lot was Roy Lichtenstein's Reverie, which sold for $175,000. Other top lots included works by Paul Klee, Marchel Duchamp, Ed Ruscha, and Pablo Picasso.

LAMA's October 3, 2008 Modern Art & Design Auction saw the highest sale total in its history, with $5.17 million in sales achieving 125% over the low estimate.

In October 2019, LAMA introduced the LAMA app, holding their first online-only auction and welcoming web-based bidding on live auction lots.

In March 2020, Peter Loughrey dies of cancer in Los Angeles. Benedikt Taschen told David Keeps for the Los Angeles Times that Loughrey “knew more about the fabric of California modernism than anyone.”

=== 2010 to 2020 ===
In August 2021, LAMA announced that it would be joining Rago Wright Auctions.

== Notable Auctions ==
May 18, 1996: This Modern Art & Design Auction featured works exclusively offered through LAMA from Richard Neutra's V.D.L. Research House in Silver Lake.

July 9, 2000: LAMA presented the first-ever auction dedicated to the influential work of Charles and Ray Eames. Preceded by the exhibition Work from the Office of Charles and Ray Eames, this auction featured 103 lots, including property from the collection of John and Marilyn Neuhart and a collector from Bloomfield Hills, Michigan. Among the significant designs offered were two rare “DCW” prototypes hand-built in the Eames Office, along with chairs, radios, House of Cards, folding screens, and storage units.

May 19, 2002: LAMA auctioned 485 lots from the Collection of Michael and Gabrielle Boyd, the Santa Monica, CA, based collectors of rare Mid-Century Modern design. Many of the items in this auction were featured in the landmark exhibition Sitting on the Edge, curated by Aaron Betsky for the San Francisco Museum of Modern Art in 1998.

June 23, 2002: The Loughreys worked in collaboration with Butterfield & Butterfield to auction works from the Playboy magazine archives, including original pin-up watercolors by Robert Vargas.

December 7, 2003: The December 7, 2003 Modern Art & Design Auction brought works from the personal collection of designer, sculptor, scholar, and collector James Prestini to the market for the first time.

May 22, 2005: The May 22, 2005 Modern Art & Design Auction featured the entire contents from the John M. Hudspeth Residence in Prineville, Oregon, designed by Paul László in 1952. The residence was one of László's most important commissions, completed at the height of his career. The 12,000 square-foot house remained intact until it was consigned by the family to LAMA, whose auction allowed the public to see the house's contents for the first time.

December 7, 2008: The first auction to be held at LAMA's Van Nuys showroom.

February 23, 2014: This Modern Art & Design Auction featured a custom commission by Ruth Asawa that realized $1.4 million, LAMA's highest selling lot at the time.

February 21, 2016: A painting by Richard Prince realized $1.58 million at this Modern Art & Design Auction, surpassing a Ruth Asawa commission for highest price paid in LAMA's history.

October 22, 2017: LAMA's 25th anniversary Modern Art & Design Auction.

October 20, 2019: LAMA's first online-only auction.

== Exhibitions ==
Select exhibitions curated, or with curatorial consultation, by LAMA founder Peter Loughrey:

2000: The Fabulous Fifties: International Modern Design, California Heritage Museum, Santa Monica, California

2000: Work from the Office of Charles & Ray Eames, LAMA showroom, Van Nuys, California

2001: New designs by Bryan Thompson, LAMA showroom, Van Nuys, California

2004: Gio Ponti: Furnished Settings & Figuration, ACME, Los Angeles, California

2005: Dutch Design, ACME, Los Angeles, California

2003: Design by Decades at Pacific Design Center's WESTWEEK, West Hollywood, California

2006: R.M. Schindler: The Gingold Commissions, Pacific Design Center, Los Angeles, California

2010: Jews on Vinyl, Skirball Cultural Center, Los Angeles, California

2010: Gaetano Pesce: Pieces of a Larger Puzzle, Istituto Italiano di Cultura, Los Angeles, California

2011: Collecting in Los Angeles: 1945–1980 for Pacific Standard Time: Art in L.A., 1945-1980, LAMA showroom, Van Nuys, California

2017: ¿Qué significa?: Emerson Woelffer in the Yucatán for Pacific Standard Time: LA/LA, LAMA Showroom, Van Nuys, California

== World Records ==
Since the company's founding in 1992, LAMA has achieved many world records at auction for works of fine art and design.

Sale Date	Artist	Title	Price Realized	Record
December 2021	Masayuki Kurokawa	Lavinia table lamps, pair	$13,750	Record for the designer
December 2021	Vasa	Towers(4)	$50,000	Record for the artist
October 2021	Ed Ruscha	Blank Signs (four works)	$20,000	Record for this edition
October 2021	Ed Ruscha	Hell	$27,500	Record for this edition
October 2021	T.J. Robsjohn-Gibbings	Rare and Important Mesa Table	$362,500	Record for this design
May 2021	Fritz Scholder	Indian with Peace Medal	$225,000	Any work by the artist at auction
May 2021	Ed Ruscha	Made in California	$87,500	Record for this edition
May 2021	Mark Bradford	630C-MB03	$18,750	Record for this edition
May 2021	Frank Stella	The Funeral (Dome)(from Moby Dick Domes Series)	$30,000	Record for this edition
Feb. 2021	Linda Stark	Visitation	$13,750	Any work by the artist at auction
Jan. 2021	Ettore Sottsass	Vase (from Hollywood Collection)	$18,750	New record for the design
Oct. 2020	Paul Allen Reed	Upstart XXXVI	$27,500	Any painting by the artist at auction
Oct. 2020	Frank Gehry	Wiggle chairs (2)	$13,750	New record for the design
Oct. 2020	Charles Arnoldi	Untitled	$31,250	Any print by the artist at auction
Aug. 2020	Raimonds Staprans	A Study of the Shiny Paint Can	$87,500	New record for works of comparable size by the artist
Aug. 2020	Vija Celmins	Drypoint – Ocean Surface	$16,250	New record for the edition
Aug. 2020	Ed Ruscha	Ghost Station	$53,125	New record for the edition
Aug. 2020	Ed Ruscha	OK (State I)	$53,125	New record for the edition
June 2020	John Baldessari	Studio	$22,500	New record for this impression
June 2020	Larry Cohen	Open Door with Chair	$17,500	Any work by the artist at auction
May 2020	Lita Albuquerque	Ereiumul Series #4	$8,750	Any drawing by the artist at auction
Feb. 2020	Henry Moore	Maquette for Seated Woman	$45,000	New record for the edition
Feb. 2020	Ellsworth Kelly	Blue/Black/Red/Green	$46,975	New record for the edition
Feb. 2020	Vija Celmins	Night Sky	$25,000	New record for the edition
Feb. 2020	Oskar Fischinger	Egyptian	$31,250	Any work by the artist at auction
Feb. 2019	Ed Ruscha	Mocha Standard	$168,750	New record for the edition
Feb. 2019	Keith Haring	Andy Mouse	$212,500	New record for the edition
Feb. 2019	Fred Eversley	Untitled	$281,250	Any work by the artist at auction
Feb. 2019	Kenneth Noland	Songs: Yesterdays	$550,000	Record for work from series at auction
Sept. 2018	Carole Feuerman	Bibi on the Ball	$118,750	Any work by the artist at auction
Sept. 2018	Ed Ruscha	Zoo	$51,250	New record for the edition
Sept. 2018	Mary Corse	Untitled	$31,250	Any work on paper by the artist at auction
Sept. 2018	Andy Warhol	Chanel	$175,000	New record for the edition
June 2018	Mary Corse	Untitled (White Light Grid)	$312,500	Any work by the artist at auction
Feb. 2018	Roy Lichtenstein	American Indian Theme III	$22,500	New record for the edition
Feb. 2018	Ad Reinhardt	Ten Screenprints by Ad Reinhardt	$23,750	New record for the portfolio
Feb. 2018	Cy Twombly	Note II	$112,500	New record for the edition
Feb. 2018	Ed Ruscha	Cheese Mold Standard with Olive	$106,250	New record for the edition
Feb. 2018	Frederick Hammersley	Home run	$200,000	Any painting by the artist at auction
March 2017	Peter Alexander	Untitled	$87,500	Any work by the artist at auction
March 2017	Chris Burden	747, Bed Piece, and Prelude to 220 or 110	$93,750	Any photograph by the artist at auction
March 2017	Alma Thomas	Spring Flowers in Washington D.C.	$387,500	Any work by the artist at auction
Oct. 2016	Jay DeFeo	Apex	$281,250	Any work by the artist at auction
May 2016	Ken Price	L.A. Riot	$58,750	Any work on paper by the artist at auction
Feb. 2016	Mary Corse	Copper-Four Crosses	$100,000	Any work by the artist at auction
Feb. 2016	John Lautner	Floor Lamp	$43,750	Any design at auction
Feb. 2016	James Gill	Infinite Regress DNA	$22,500	Any work by the artist at auction
Oct. 2014	Ed Ruscha	Double Standard	$206,250	Any print by the artist at auction
Oct. 2014	Mike Kelley	Nazi War Cave #1	$740,000	Any work on paper by the artist at auction
Oct. 2014	Robert Mapplethorpe	Self Portrait	$87,500	New record for the edition
Oct. 2014	Maria Pergay	Flying Carpet, daybed	$162,500	New record for the design at auction
Feb. 2014	Ruth Asawa	Untitled S.437 (Hanging, Seven-Lobed, Two-Part Continuous Form within a Form with Two Small Spheres)	$1,430,000	Tied world record for any work by the artist at auction
May 2010	Francois-Xavier Lalanne	Singes Attentifs SI & SII	$199,062.50	New record for 'Monkeys' at auction
June 2007	Andy Warhol	Marilyn (#28)	$144,000	New record for Marilyn series by Warhol
May 1999	Charles Eames & Eero Saarinen	"Conversation" prototype armchair	$129,000	New record for this design at auction

== Television & Publications ==
LAMA founder Peter Loughrey was a frequent appraiser on the PBS series Antiques Roadshow; he joined the program in 2003. For a full list of his appraisals, see here. He contributed to multiple publications as an authority on Modern art and design, including the Taschen volumes Julius Shulman, Modernism Rediscovered, Case Study Houses, and Collecting Design.

== Press ==
- My 'Antiques Roadshow' moment with auctioneer Peter Loughrey, champion of California modernism, Los Angeles Times, March 23, 2020
- Peter Loughrey, founder of Los Angeles Modern Auctions, leaves us at 52, KCRW, March 19, 2020
- Peter Loughrey, Esteemed Auctioneer and Curator, Dies After Battle with Cancer, Architectural Digest, March 18, 2020
- The irresistible rise of Light and Space, The Art Newspaper, October 20, 2017
- How Peter Loughrey Went from Homeless to A Millionaire Art Dealer, CNBC, July 9, 2017
- Auction Record: Alma Thomas's 1969 Vision of ‘Spring Flowers’ Yields More Than $300K, Culture Type, March 6, 2017
- Why It's a Great Time to Be Buying Collectible Art, Fortune, November 11, 2016
- A rare sculpture by 20th-century Italian-American artist Harry Bertoia enters the market, Surface, February 2015
- Artelligence Podcast: Peter Loughrey, Los Angeles Modern Auctions, September 17, 2014
- William Haines’ custom designs from 1960 to be auctioned, Los Angeles Times, May 17, 2014
- L.A. Auctioneer Peter Loughrey on Mixing Art and Design, Artspace, January 7, 2014
- L.A. Modern Auctions: Record haul for 2011 design sale, Los Angeles Times, 2011
- Moving Pictures: The collection of a lifetime is ready for a new home, C Magazine, October 2011
- A Sotheby's Catalog With Some Juicy Details, New York Times, February 24, 2011
- Style and wit, Los Angeles Times, May 30, 2009
- It's Modern No Longer, But Precious, New York Times, December 5, 2003
- Thoroughly Modern Milieu, Los Angeles Times, October 14, 1999
