= William McNamara =

American actor (born 1965)

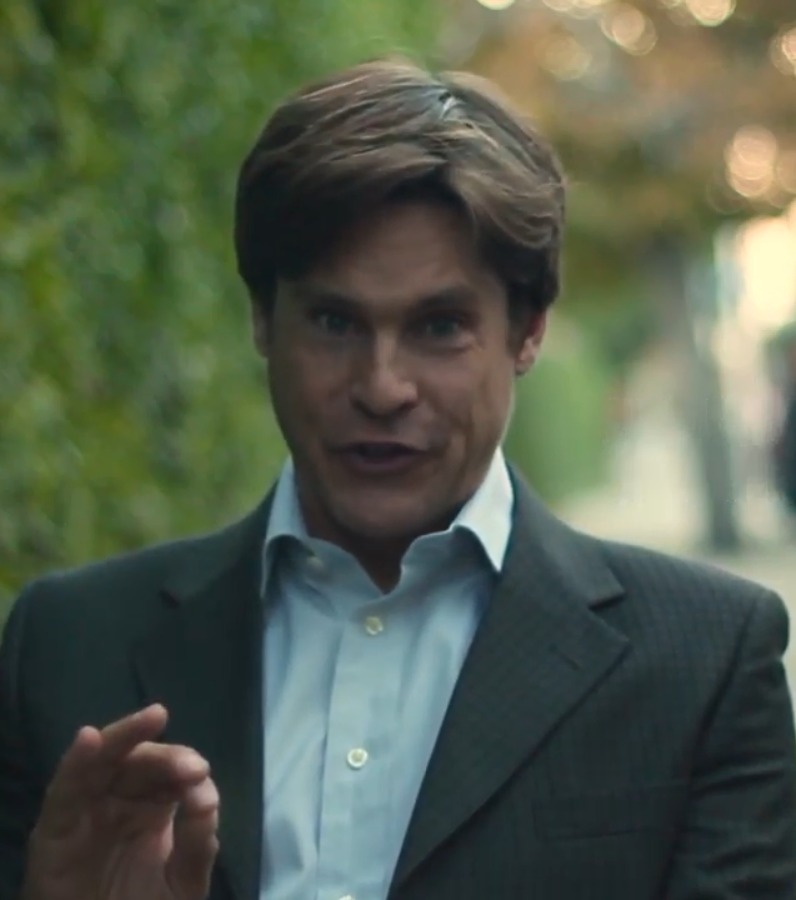
- McNamara in 2014
- Born: William West McNamara; March 31, 1965 (age 61); Dallas, Texas, U.S.
- Occupation: Actor
- Years active: 1987–present

William West McNamara (born March 31, 1965) is an American film and television actor.

== Personal life ==
Born in Dallas, Texas, McNamara is the son of a Ford Motor Company employee and an interior designer. He attended Salisbury School, Columbia University, and studied at the Lee Strasberg Institute in New York.

== Career ==
McNamara appeared in the feature films Texasville, Stella, Copycat, Surviving the Game, and Stealing Home. On television, he portrayed Montgomery Clift in Liz: The Elizabeth Taylor Story and Ricky Nelson in Nightmares & Dreamscapes: From the Stories of Stephen King, had a regular role on the Showtime series Beggars and Choosers, was featured in the television movies Doing Time on Maple Drive and Wildflower (CableACE Award nomination), and appeared in NYPD Blue and Law & Order: SVU, among other television series.

== Activism ==
McNamara is an animal rights activist and vegan. He got his start rescuing cats, dogs, and horses, and now travels the world advocating for animal rights. McNamara has produced several documentaries, including the Nat Geo Wild Network: Animal Intervention, an exposé on the exotic animal industry in the United States.

== Filmography ==
=== Film ===
Year	Title	Role	Notes
1987	Opera	Stefano	
1988	The Beat	Billy Kane	
1988	Stealing Home	Teenage Billy Wyatt	
1989	Dream a Little Dream	Joel	
1990	Stella	Pat Robbins	
1990	Texasville	Dickie Jackson	
1991	Wildflower	Sammy Perkins	
1993	Aspen Extreme	Todd Pounds	
1994	Storybook	Prince Arthur	
1994	Surviving the Game	Derek Wolfe Jr.	
1994	Chasers	Eddie Devane	
1994	Radio Inside	Matthew Anderson	
1995	Girl in the Cadillac	Rick	
1995	Copycat	Peter Foley	
1996	Dead Girl	Damon	
1996	Natural Enemy	Jeremy	Video
1996	Snitch	Shakley	
1997	Stag	Jon DiCapri	
1997	The Deli	Kevin	
1997	Glam	Sonny Daye	
1998	Sweet Jane	Stan Bleeker	
1998	The Brylcreem Boys	Sam Gunn	
1998	Something to Believe In	Mike	
1998	Ringmaster	Troy Davenport	
1998	Implicated	Tom Baker	
1999	Paper Bullets	Laurence McCoy	
2000	Knockout	Michael DeMarco	
2000	Just Sue Me	Daniel	
2001	Time Lapse	Clayton Pirce	Video
2002	Man of Faith	Bobby Murky	
2004	The Kings of Brooklyn	Chris Parmel	
2006	The Iron Man	Gerard	
2007	The Still Life	Teacher	
2007	April Moon	David	
2007	A Dance for Bethany	James Fisher	
2008	The Grift	Hugh Babcock	
2009	The Bleeding	Det. Dan Williams	
2010	The Ascent	Joel	
2011	The Legend of Hell's Gate: An American Conspiracy	Jones Moon	
2011	Henry	Paul	Short
2013	The Devil's Dozen	-	
2013	Ambushed	Agent Waters	
2013	My Stepbrother Is a Vampire!?!	Gordon	
2014	Cut!	Bryan Wolff	
2014	Stranded	Doc Holliday	
2014	Historias del canal	Jerry	
2014	Day of the Mummy	Jack	
2014	Je T'aime, Au Revoir	Clark	
2014	Truth	Luke Mezrich	
2014	Dry	Dr. Brown	
2015	Beyond the Farthest Star	Calvin Clayman	
2015	Medusa	Dr. Gleason	
2015	The Wicked Within	David	
2016	Streets of East L.A.	Mr. Zelman	
2016	Last Man Club	Joe Scanlin	
2016	Fishes 'n Loaves: Heaven Sent	Jimmy Watkins	
2016	Enemy Within	Solano	
2016	The Secrets of Emily Blair	Mr. Regan	
2016	Brothers in Arms	Dennis	Short
2016	Star Paws	General Ruff	
2017	Dr. Jekyll and Mr. Hyde	Bradshaw	
2017	Down on the Farm		
2017	Gas Light	Dr. Ernest Hancock	
2017	The Audit	Jack Healey	Short
2017	Opus of an Angel	Stephen	
2017	I Believe	Robert Bruckwood	
2017	Happenstance	Bodhi	
2018	Requiescat	Troy	Short
2018	Left for Dead	Dean	
2018	Clark	Man	Short
2019	Rottentail	Jake Mulligan	
2019	Justice for Vincent	Roger Evans	Short
2019	Da Pinche Code II	Spiritual Healer	
2019	The Beginning: Feel the Dead	Daniel	
2020	Hacked	Tyler Fuller	Short
2020	The 2nd	Jalil	
2020	Nowheresville	Agent Gallagher	
2021	American Desert	Buddy	
2021	Raunch and Roll	Don	
2022	Blowback	Doc Byrne	
2022	Amber Road	James	
2023	Altered Perceptions	Ron San Diego	
2023	Mojave Diamonds	Jason David	
2023	Dead Man's Hand	Johnny	
2024	Angels Fallen: Warriors of Peace	Roman	
2025	Pandora: Fire and Ice	Ian Mather	Video

=== Television ===
Year	Title	Role	Notes
1987	CBS Schoolbreak Special	Jay Medford	Episode: "Soldier Boys"
1988	The Secret of the Sahara	Philip Jordan	Main Cast
1989	The Edge	Boy	Episode: "Indian Poker"
1989–1990	Island Son	Sam Kulani	Recurring Cast
1991	ABC Afterschool Special	Johnny Dumont	Episode: "It's Only Rock & Roll"
1992	Doing Time on Maple Drive	Matt Carter	TV movie
1992	Honor Thy Mother	Chris	TV movie
1992	Silk Stalkings	Clay Edwards	Episode: "The Brotherhood"
1993	Extreme Justice	Mark Franklin	TV movie
1993	Sworn to Vengeance	Michael Burke	TV movie
1995	Liz: The Elizabeth Taylor Story	Montgomery Clift	TV movie
1997	Perversions of Science	Nick Boyer	Episode: "Given the Heir"
1998	Welcome to Paradox	Q.M. Cooper	Episode: "Blue Champagne Resort"
1998	Brimstone	Gilbert Jax	Episode: "Encore"
1999	The Outer Limits	Kimble	Episode: Better Luck Next Time"
1999–2000	Beggars and Choosers	Brad Advail	Main Cast: Season 1, Recurring Cast: Season 2
2000	The Hunger	Kent Johanssen	Episode: "Approaching Desdemona"
2001	Trapped	C. Whitmore Evans	TV movie
2003	Law & Order: Special Victims Unit	Detective Sam Bishop	Episode: "Pandora"
2005	NYPD Blue	Richard Pancava	Episode: "Old Man Quiver"
2005	McBride: Murder Past Midnight	Tony Harriman	TV movie
2005	American Black Beauty	Wilford	TV movie
2006	Nightmares and Dreamscapes	Ricky Nelson	Episode: "You Know They Got a Hell of a Band"
2007	Beyond the Break	Richard	Recurring Cast: Season 2
2012	DTLA	Norm	Recurring Cast
2014	High School Possession	Reverend Young	TV movie
2015	The Astronaut Wives Club	Robert Kennedy	Episode: "The Dark Side"
2016	The Wrong Roommate	Mark	TV movie
2017	The Wrong Student	Detective Andrade	TV movie
2017	Running Away	Richard	TV movie
2017	Feel the Dead	Daniel	Main Cast
2018	The Wrong Cruise	Pat	TV movie
2018	A Wedding for Christmas	Frank	TV movie
2018	Age of the Living Dead	Dr. Howard	Main Cast: Season 1, Recurring Cast: Season 3
2019	The Wrong Tutor	Mr. Lloyd	TV movie
2020	The Christmas High Note	Brad	TV movie
2020	The Wrong Stepfather	Mr. Crane	TV movie
