= Lady Jayne: Killer =

2003 film directed by Mark L. Lester

Lady Jane: Killer Betrayal
- DVD cover
- Directed by: Mark L. Lester
- Written by: Jeffrey Goldenberg; C. Courtney Joyner
- Produced by: Mark L. Lester; Dana Dubovsky
- Starring: Erika Eleniak; Julie du Page; Adam Baldwin; James Remar; Louis Mandylor
- Cinematography: Joao Fernandes
- Edited by: Donn Aron; Daniel Macena
- Music by: Richard McHugh
- Distributed by: American World Pictures
- Release date: 2003
- Running time: 90 minutes
- Country: United States
- Language: English

Betrayal (also known as Lady Jayne: Killer) is a thriller film released in 2003. The film stars Erika Eleniak, Julie du Page, Adam Baldwin, James Remar and Louis Mandylor.

== Film synopsis ==
Jayne Ferré (du Page) is a professional assassin that works for the Mafia. When one of her hits goes wrong, she ends up with a suitcase full of a million dollars that belongs to mob boss Frank Bianci (Louis Mandylor). Knowing that he has put a price on her head, Ferré decides to leave Los Angeles and ends up hitching a ride with Kerry, a teenager running from a drug dealer, and his mother, Emily (Eleniak).

After agreeing to cover their expenses, Jayne, Emily, and Kerry head for Texas. During the ride, their car breaks down which forces them to spend a night in a motel. On the night, Kerry discovers Jayne's money and decides to return to LA to pay his debt.

When Jayne finds out, she kidnaps Emily and they go to LA after Kerry to recover her money. Emily manages to escape, and stumbles upon Alex Tyler, an FBI agent who agrees to protect her and to take her to her son.

== Cast ==
- Erika Eleniak as Emily Shaw
- Julie du Page as Jayne Ferré
- Adam Baldwin as Detective Mark Winston
- James Remar as Alex Tyler
- Louis Mandylor as Frank Bianci
- Jeremy Lelliott as Kerry

== Release ==
The film DVD premiered on 2003 in Italy, Netherlands, Finland, Spain, United States, and Germany.
