= The Still Life (2007 film) =

2007 American film by Joel A. Miller

- Directed by: Joel A. Miller
- Written by: Joel A. Miller
- Produced by: Joel A. Miller
- Starring: Jason Barry; Rachel Miner; Terry Moore; Holly Fields
- Music by: Dizzy Reed, Dave Sabo
- Release date: August 7, 2007
- Running time: 136 minutes
- Country: U.S.
- Language: English

The Still Life is a 2007 film written, produced, and directed by Joel A. Miller. The feature film is a drama that tells the story of fictitious artist Julian Lamont. The film stars Jason Barry, Rachel Miner, & Terry Moore.

Miller stated the main character Julian Lamont's story and his tumultuous struggles were developed while Miller was on the road touring with the band Stone Temple Pilots. The main character was modeled off of his perceptions of Scott Weiland at the time. Miller wrote much of the script while traveling with the band as a roadie. Miller made the film with his earnings while working in the music industry with a budget of 24 thousand dollars.

The film won the bronze medal at the Park City Film Music Festival. After its festival circuit run, it was released by Warner Bros.

== Synopsis ==
Julian Lamont (Jason Barry) struggles to pick up the pieces of his tattered life. A reclusive alcoholic, Julian creates a new art genre called Destructionism, and his work soon catapults him into the limelight. As his success in the art world grows, Julian loses touch with the artist he truly desires to be, and his personal life tailspins out of control.

== Cast ==
- Jason Barry as Julian Lamont
- Rachel Miner as Robin
- Terry Moore as Mrs. Stratford
- Don S. Davis as Mr. Fernot
- Robert Miano as Mr. Rifken
- Holly Fields as Stephanie
- Angel Boris as Cindy
- Jonathan Davis as Liquor Store Clerk
- Josh Todd as Hutch
- Razaaq Adoti as Rodney
- Patricia Belcher as Meter Maid
- Michael Callen as Resident
- Domenica Cameron-Scorsese as Self
- Grant Cramer as the Gnome Guy
- Shay Duffin as the Bartender
- Dean Dinning as Art Critic
- Gita Hall as Self
- Doug Carrion as Museum Security Guard
- Delaney Bramlett as Self
- Kato Kaelin as Photographer
- Yolanda King as Self/Art Buyer
- Rae'Ven Larrymore Kelly as Self/Art Buyer
- Tommy Lister Jr. as Self/Art Buyer
- William McNamara as Teacher
- Angelo Moore as Sax Player
- Joel Michaely as Robert
- Danny Pintauro as Stefan
- Al Snow as Art Buyer
- Louise Post as Lounge Singer
- Dizzy Reed as Piano Player
- Kim Shattuck as Museum Curator
- Matthew Nelson as Guitar Player
- Daize Shayne as Autograph Seeker

== Soundtracks ==
- The Still Life Soundtrack, Danescroft Music Publishing, 2007

Bringing many of the people involved with the production onto the soundtrack, the film featured new music by Dizzy Reed, Dean Dinning, Joel A. Miller, Adrian Young, Doug Carrion, Pete Finestone, Darius Rucker, Dave Sabo, Louise Post, Angelo Moore, Delaney Bramlett, Matthew Nelson, and Sonny Mone. The soundtrack was released in conjunction with the film through Warner Bros. in 2007.
