= Double Down (film) =

2001 film by Mars Callahan

- Directed by: Mars Callahan
- Written by: Mars Callahan; Doug Klein
- Produced by: Andrew Molina; Byron Werner
- Starring: Jason Priestley; Alicia Coppola; Mars Callahan; Jeremy Blackman; Dinah Manoff; Richard Portnow; David Proval; Peter Dobson; Karen Dior; Kane Picoy; Justin Jon Ross
- Narrated by: Kane Picoy
- Cinematography: Christopher C. Pearson
- Edited by: Michael Chaskes
- Music by: Micha Liberman; S. Unger
- Distributed by: Lions Gate
- Release date: 2001
- Running time: 93 minutes
- Country: United States
- Language: English

Double Down (original titled Zigs) is a 2001 American drama film directed by Mars Callahan, and starring Jason Priestley, Peter Dobson and Richard Portnow. It received an R rating by the MPAA.

== Plot ==
Four young compulsive gamblers waste their lives on booze, broads and bookies. David (Jason Priestley), the heavy-drinking ladies man. Mike (Kane Picoy), a degenerate gambler. Cory the Jersey Jinx (Peter Dobson). Brett (Justin Jon Ross), the guy who tells every girl he loves her on the first date. When they find themselves in debt to a psychotic Christopher Walken obsessed hit man (Mars Callahan) they come up with a radical plan to get out of debt with a fixed game.
