= Memoir of a Roadie =

2020 autobiography by Joel Miller

- First edition
- Author: Joel A. Miller
- Cover artist: Raymond Pettibon
- Language: English
- Subject: Hard rock, heavy metal music
- Genre: Autobiography
- Publisher: Albion Entertainment, Inc.
- Publication date: August 8, 2020 (first edition)
- Publication place: United States
- Pages: 510
- ISBN: 9798670742405

Memoir of a Roadie is the 2020 autobiography of Joel A. Miller. The book explores his relationships travelling and working for Guns N' Roses, Stone Temple Pilots, Poison, and The Cranberries, among many other bands.
