= Second to Die =

- Directed by: Brad Marlowe
- Written by: George Morgan; Anita Doohan; Adrienne Armstrong
- Produced by: Paula Silver; Lara Levicki-Lavi
- Starring: Erika Eleniak; Jerry Kroll; Colleen Camp; Kimberly Rowe; John Wesley Shipp; Paul Winfield
- Cinematography: Moshe Levin
- Edited by: Gena Bleier; Pam Wise
- Music by: Andrew Dorfman
- Release date: April 23, 2002
- Running time: 89 minutes
- Country: United States
- Language: English

Second to Die is a thriller film released in 2002. The film stars Erika Eleniak, Jerry Kroll, and Colleen Camp. Its tagline was "One murder is never enough".

== Synopsis ==
Sara Bratchett (Eleniak) is a woman who thinks the murder of her husband (John Wesley Shipp) will solve all her problems. However, she realizes that it won't be enough.

Her sister, Amber, finds her diary after Sara is found dead. Through the pages, flashbacks are seen to Sara's marriage, the death of her husband, her second marriage, and a twist ending that exposes the truth behind all the relationships.

Her first husband has a "second to die" life insurance policy, where the beneficiary receives the money after both people die—in this case, both Sara and her husband.

After the plane explosion, Sara marries her husband's friend, "Scooch" Scucello. What she doesn't know is that he's involved with her neighbor, Cynthia, who is seen putting on a wig. Her wig becomes crucial later on.

"Scooch" arranges Sara's death in search of the three million dollar payout. The showdown between husband and wife ends with Sara shot dead and floating in the pool. The sister is shown reading the journal discovering that her sister is really alive and in Europe; and the movie ends with her traveling to meet her boyfriend in New York.

== Cast ==
- Erika Eleniak as Sara Bratchett Scucello, née Morgan
- Jerry Kroll as Raymond "Scooch" Scucello
- Colleen Camp as Cynthia Evans
- Kimberly Rowe as Amber Morgan
- John Wesley Shipp as Jim Bratchett
- Paul Winfield as Detective John Grady

== Filming ==
The film was shot in Los Angeles, California.

== Release ==
The film was first released on video in Spain. Later, on April 23, 2002, the film was released in United States.
