= Poolhall Junkies =

- DVD cover
- Directed by: Mars Callahan
- Written by: Mars Callahan; Chris Corso
- Produced by: Karen Beninati; David Kronemeyer; Vincent Newman; David Peters; Tucker Tooley
- Starring: Mars Callahan; Chazz Palminteri; Rod Steiger; Michael Rosenbaum; Rick Schroder; Alison Eastwood; Christopher Walken
- Cinematography: Robert Morris
- Edited by: James Tooley
- Music by: Richard Glasser; Charlie Terrell
- Production company: Gold Circle Films
- Distributed by: Samuel Goldwyn Films
- Release dates: June 8, 2002 (CineVegas); February 28, 2003
- Running time: 94 minutes
- Language: English
- Budget: $4 million
- Box office: $563,711

Poolhall Junkies is a 2002 comedy-drama thriller film co-written, starring and directed by Mars Callahan. It is the story of a pool hustler who is opposed by his former mentor, with a new prodigy, in a climactic big-stakes nine-ball match.

The film also features Chazz Palminteri, Rod Steiger (in his final film role), Michael Rosenbaum, Rick Schroder, Alison Eastwood and Christopher Walken. It received negative reviews from critics.

== Plot ==
Most of the film takes place in a pool hall run by Nick. Obsessed by the world of pool, Johnny could be one of the best. But his mentor Joe, a shady stakehorse, trains Johnny as a hustler and decides how and who Johnny plays. Unbeknownst to Johnny, Joe has been holding him back from his dream: playing in the legitimate pro tour. When Johnny finally learns that Joe intercepted and discarded an invitation for Johnny to join the pro tour, he breaks from Joe, throwing a game with a large pot. Losing both that stake money and his hustler income source sparks Joe to violence, and he breaks Johnny's bridge hand outside the pool hall (an homage to a similar scene in the classic pool film The Hustler). Some of Johnny's friends later beat Joe up as a warning to leave him alone.

After a request from his girlfriend Tara, Johnny essentially leaves the world of pool hustling. He finally commits to a "real" job in the construction business but is soon miserable there. He spends most of his time with his younger brother Danny, a musician with aspirations of following in Johnny's hustler footsteps, despite Johnny's discouragement of this path. Johnny meets Tara's wealthy uncle, Mike. He and Johnny hustle some of Mike's business associates, one an executive at Tara's employer. Rather than bet money on himself, Johnny wagers a high-placed position for Tara, with Mike putting up a car as their side of the stake. Johnny wins a challenging trick-shot bet (to duplicate a difficult shot Mike had made in the previous game), and the promotion for Tara, but keeps the reason for her new opportunity a secret. (She eventually figures out the reason behind her advancement to such a competitive position but understands that Johnny was trying to help her the only way he knew how.)

As for Joe, he is bent on revenge for the beating he took, and soon he has a new protégé, Brad, who is just as good as, if not better, than Johnny. Joe also focuses on Johnny's brother as a mark for Brad's hustling. Brad and Danny play a high-stakes pool game, which ends in a huge debt owed to Joe by Danny, who is no match for Brad. Johnny later finds that his brother is in jail for trying to steal the money he owes and that Joe will come after Johnny for the money. The only way out is for Johnny to play against Brad for an even larger sum – to pay off Joe and fund his brother's legal defense. This results in a race-to-nine showdown that pits two of the greatest players against each other for a large sum of money – and perhaps even for Johnny and Danny's lives. One of the brothers' affluent friends puts up some of the stake money, and Mike provides the rest, then even increases the stakes. During a tense time-out, Mike delivers a memorable monologue (in Walken's intense style, as most famously used in Pulp Fiction), likening Johnny to a slumbering lion whose time has come to rise and chase off the hyenas and jackals. Mike then raises the stakes to a level that will bankrupt Joe if Brad loses.

The match comes down to a very difficult final shot for Brad. Johnny sharks Brad while calculating how to take the shot, telling him how easy the shot is and how Johnny would even pay to take that shot for him. Smelling an opportunity to get more money from Johnny, Joe agrees and makes Brad let Johnny attempt the shot. Johnny does so but does not pocket the final ball. As Brad prepares to take the winning shot, Johnny stops him: since he paid for the privilege of taking Brad's turn, it is now Johnny's turn again. Before Brad or Joe can react, Johnny easily pockets the last ball and wins the match, exploiting the hustling techniques he learned from Joe. Joe is prepared to resort to violence again, but Johnny predicted this and has the same friends who roughed up Joe before dragging him away. On his way out of the pool hall, Brad stays out of it and suggests Johnny should get onto the pro tour. In the closing shot, Johnny is shown happily playing a pro-tour match. (The resolution of Danny's legal trouble is left as a loose end.)

== Cast ==
- Mars Callahan as Johnny Doyle
- Chazz Palminteri as Joe
- Rod Steiger as Nick
- Michael Rosenbaum as Danny Doyle
- Rick Schroder as Brad
- Alison Eastwood as Tara
- Christopher Walken as Uncle Mike
- Mike Massey as Louie "St. Louis Louie"
- Richard Portnow as Jay "Toupee Jay"
- Chris Corso as Houseman
- Robert LeBlanc as Tournament Pro
- Charlie Terrell as The Guitar Player in Danny's Band
- Ernie Reyes Jr. as Tang
- Glenn Plummer as Chico
- Anson Mount as Chris
- Phillip Glasser as Max
- Shannon Engemann as Beth

== Production ==
There were no camera tricks or special film editing used for any of the billiards shots in the film, although many of the special trick shots were performed by professional player Robert "Cotton" Leblanc. Mike Massey, another world-renowned trick shot performer, has a cameo appearance as "St. Louis" Louie in the film as well. Christopher Walken made the difficult trick shot to win a game against Tara's boss on the first take. He was supposed to make a "trial run" for the scene, but he asked that the cameras go ahead and roll, in case he happened to make it on his first try, and he did.

In real life, Mars Callahan is an accomplished pool player who met co-writer Chris Corso in a pool hall where each was trying to hustle the other. After a bitterly contested game (neither will tell who actually won) the two became good friends. Swapping war stories about their mutual experiences playing pool, the two decided to write a script based on their experiences and observations. Two weeks later the script was completed, but it would take another ten years to get it to the big screen.

Filmed in Salt Lake City, Utah, the film includes several references to the Salt Lake Valley and prominently places the Salt Lake Temple in the background of a scene.

== Reception ==
Poolhall Junkies received mostly negative reviews from critics: the review aggregator Rotten Tomatoes sampled 43 reviews, and gave the film a 33% positive rating. Metacritic, which uses a weighted average, assigned the film a score of 36 out of 100, based on 15 critics, indicating "generally unfavorable" reviews.
