= Ugg boots trademark dispute =

Legal conflict between footwear manufacturers

Ugg boots trademark disputes are the disputes between some footwear manufacturers, as to whether "ugg" is a protected trademark, or a generic term and thus ineligible for trademark protection. In Australia and New Zealand, where "Ugg" is a generic term for the style of footwear, 702 registered trademarks include the term "Ugg" in various logos and designs. By contrast, UGG is a registered trademark of the California-based company Deckers Outdoor Corporation in over 130 countries worldwide, including the U.S., the European Union, and China.

Ugg boots (sometimes called uggs) in Australia and New Zealand are a unisex style of sheepskin boot. In many other countries, however, UGG boots are a brand of footwear owned by Deckers. The boots are made of twin-faced sheepskin with fleece on the inside and with a tanned outer surface, often with a synthetic sole. The boots originated in Australia and New Zealand, initially as utilitarian footwear worn for warmth and comfort. UGG boots emerged as a fashion trend in the United States in the late 1990s and as a world-wide trend in the late 2000s.

== Trademark law in the United States ==
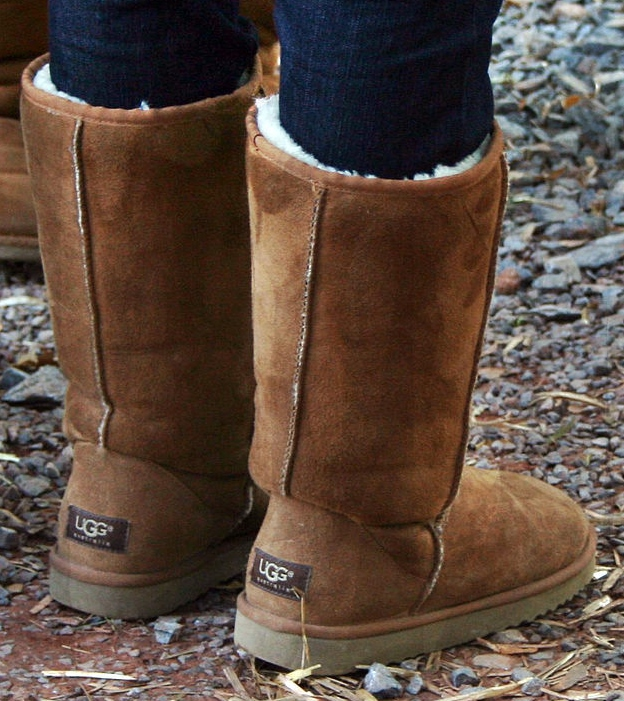
A pair of UGG boots from the United States where the name is trademarked

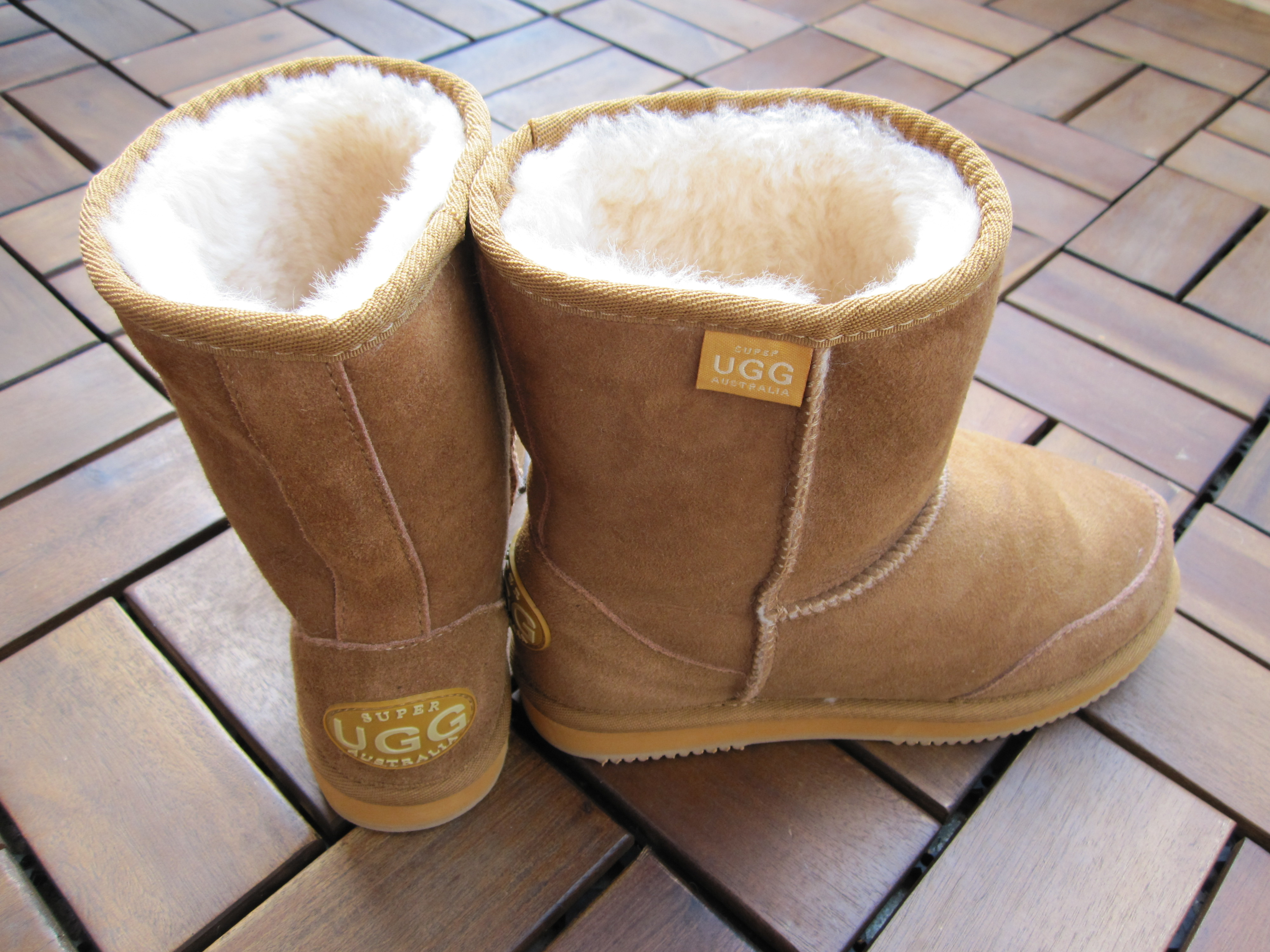
A pair of Ugg boots made in Australia where the name is generic

The Lanham Act is the primary statute governing federal trademark law in the United States; however, as it only applies to "commerce which may lawfully be regulated by Congress", it does not address terms that are used in foreign countries. (Note: Witherell, Brendan (2006). "Trademark Law—The Extraterritorial Application Of The Lanham Act". Western New England Law Review. 29 (1): 204–208. For a court to assert extraterritorial jurisdiction for the Lanham Act, (1) the conduct of the defendant must have a "substantial" effect on U.S. commerce; (2) the defendant must be a U.S. citizen; and (3) there can be no conflict with foreign law. Failing to satisfy one of the factors "might well be determinative", and "the absence of [two] is certainly fatal". — Vanity Fair Mills, Inc. v. T. Eaton Co., 234 F.2d 633 (2d Cir. 1956).) The doctrine of foreign equivalents guideline serves this purpose.

Under the doctrine of "foreign equivalents", a foreign language term used in a foreign country that is considered generic in that country cannot be imported into the United States and used as a trademark. In applying the doctrine, the courts consistently refer to two policy rationales. The first rationale, "the doctrine serves the interests of domestic competition":

"Because of the diversity of the population of the United States, coupled with temporary visitors, all of whom are part of the United States marketplace, commerce in the United States utilizes innumerable foreign languages. No merchant may obtain the exclusive right over a trademark registration if that exclusivity would prevent competitors from designating a product as what it is in the language their customers know best." — Otokoyama Co. Ltd. Vs Wine of Japan Import Inc.

The second rationale, "the doctrine serves the interests of international comity":

"Because United States companies would be hamstrung in international trade if foreign countries granted trademark protection to generic English words, the United States reciprocates and refuses trademark protection to generic foreign words." — Enrique Bernat F., S.A. v. Guadalajara, Inc.

However, the Trademark Manual of Examining Procedure ("TMEP") states that the test for applying the doctrine of foreign equivalents is "whether, to those American buyers familiar with the foreign language, the word would denote its English equivalent". (Note: Guidance on when to apply the doctrine of foreign equivalents. Examination Guide 1-08 United States Patent and Trademark Office April 23, 2008 The Trademark Trial and Appeal Board has, for the purposes of the guide, ruled that an "ordinary American purchaser" refers to the "significant portion of consumers" who speak both English and the relevant foreign language. In the case In re Joint Stock Co. "Baik ," 80 USPQ2d 1305, 1310, 0.22% was accepted as a significant portion of consumers in the United States.) Thus the doctrine is generally interpreted by courts as not applying if the generic word is not a word from a foreign language, but one from an English-speaking foreign country. (Note: For foreign countries in which English is the primary language, the U.S. Court of Appeals ruled that the generic status of an English-language term in that country was "irrelevant to the question [of] whether it should be accorded the same status in America" and carried no weight. Similarly, a California court has held that the "genericness" of an English-language term in an English-speaking foreign country "was not determinative of the alleged genericness of that term in the United States." — Rest Elizabeth J. (2006), Lost in Translation: pg. 1244 + 1246) (Note: Trademark Manual of Examining Procedure § 1207.01: 1207.01(b)(vi) Doctrine of Foreign Equivalents "The doctrine should be applied only when it is likely that the ordinary American purchaser would stop and translate the foreign word into its English equivalent.")

Court cases have noted that the generic status accorded to English-language words in foreign countries has no bearing on the registration of marks in the United States. The genericity argument was invoked for Ugg boots and was rejected by a U.S. district court which cited the following cases in support. In Anheuser-Busch, Inc. v. Stroh Brewery Co., the court rejected as irrelevant the generic usage of the phrase "L.A. beer" in Australia for low-alcohol beer. The court ruled that "a term may be generic in one country and suggestive in another" and that genericity in Australia was irrelevant. In Carcione v. The Greengrocer, Inc., the court rejected as irrelevant the generic use of the term "Greengrocer" in most English speaking countries for a retailer of fruit. The court rejected the argument on the grounds that it is irrelevant how a term is used outside the United States: "The parties agree that the term is generic in Britain. Since we deal here with American trademark law, and thus American consumers, neither British usage nor the dictionary definition indicating such usage are determinative." In another case, the court stated that while a term may be generic in another country, if "it is not so recognized in this country [the U.S.]... the mark must still be regarded as arbitrary and fanciful in the United States." and thus remains eligible for registration as a trademark in the United States.

As the doctrine is a guideline rather than a rule, it has been criticized with commentators noting that United States courts are often contradictory and inconsistent in their application of the doctrine, and that it provides little guidance to owners when choosing their marks or to courts when assessing protectability or likelihood of mark confusion. It has been suggested by the International Trademark Association that the doctrine be abolished and replaced with one that applies equally to all foreign words, regardless of whether they are from a foreign language or an English language, and that they take into account that country's trademark laws. Under the proposed changes, "Terms that are generic are never protectible as trademarks and are never registerable".

== Trademark disputes ==
Deckers UGG logo as registered in 1999. Deckers has registered "ugg" as a trademark in over 130 countries.

The UGG trademark has been the subject of dispute in several countries. The trademark for "Ugh-Boots" has been removed from the trademark registry in Australia for non-use. Outside Australia and New Zealand, "UGG", in capital letters, is a registered trademark of Deckers Outdoor Corporation.

In 1971, an Australian surfer, Shane Steadman, registered the name "UGH-BOOTS" as a trademark in Australia and began selling sheepskin boots under that name. In 1982 he registered the name "UGH" and a logo containing a stylised Sun with the words "UGG AUSTRALIA". In 1979, Brian Smith, another Australian surfer, applied to be the United States distributor for Country Leather, a Western Australian manufacturer of ugg boots, and began selling their Australian-made boots in New York and to surfers in California. In 1987 he set up Ugg Holdings Inc. and in 1995 purchased the trademarks from Steadman. In 1996 he sold his interest to Deckers and in 1999 Deckers registered the trademarks for "UGG" in the US and 25 foreign countries. Deckers began asserting its new trademark and sent out cease and desist letters to Australian manufacturers who were using the name ugg for their boots but otherwise took little action. In the early 2000s, demand for ugg boots was soaring, partly as a result of US$8 million spent on marketing by Deckers, but also due to several celebrity endorsements.

For the nine months to September 2004, UGG boots sales totaled $39.2 million, an increase of 180% over the previous year. Plans were also in place to expand the UGG brand to cover hats, scarves and gloves. With the continuing rise in popularity, Deckers now began a serious effort to halt the use of the name "ugg" by other manufacturers. Deckers' law firm, Middletons of Melbourne, sent cease and desist letters to a number of Australian and American manufacturers who were selling uggs over the Internet, preventing them from selling uggs on eBay or from using the word in their domain names or registered business names.

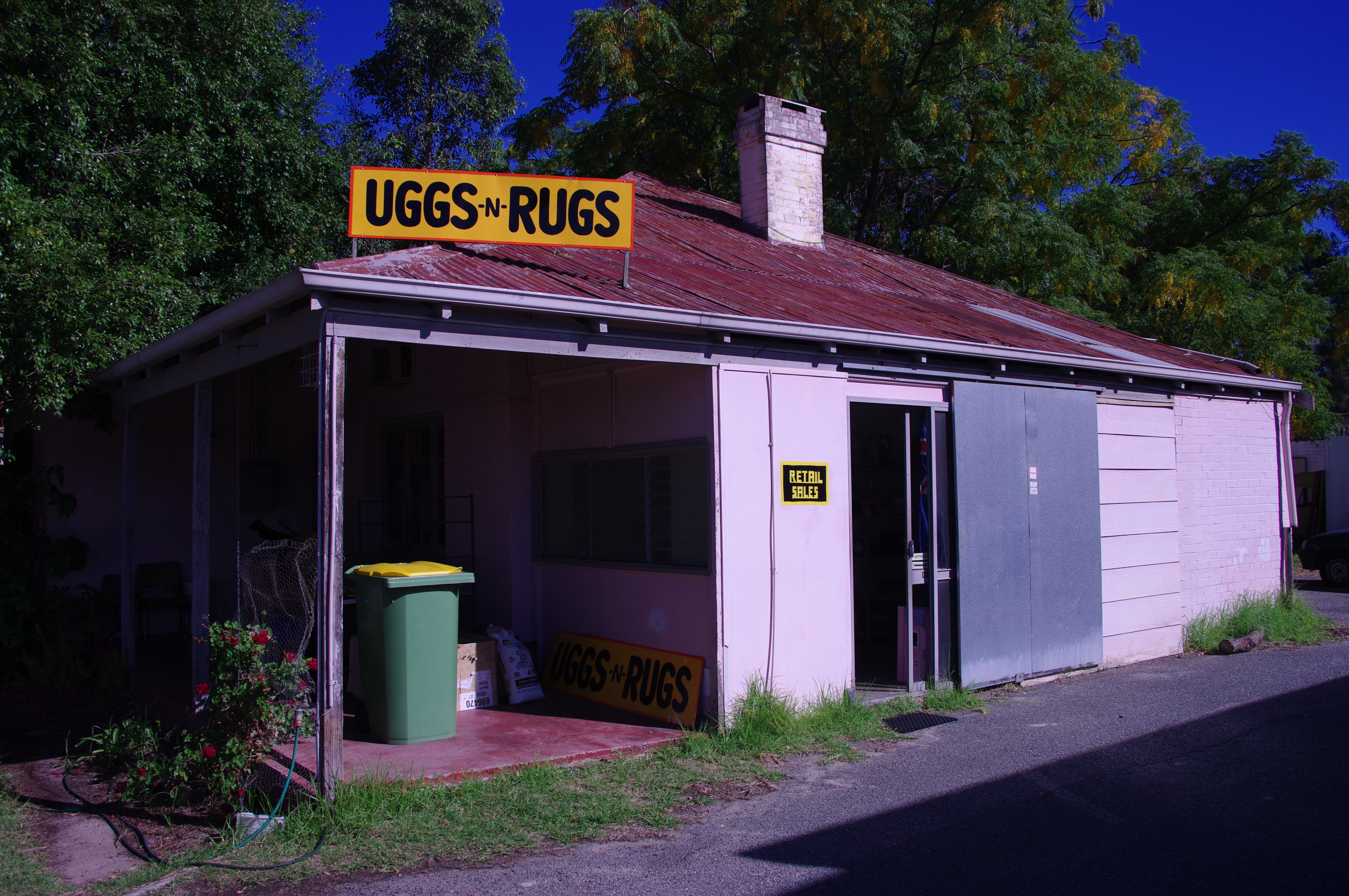
Uggs-N-Rugs factory in Kenwick, Western Australia

The manufacture of ugg boots in Australia was primarily a cottage industry. Individually lacking the resources to fight Deckers, 20 Australian manufacturers formed the Australian Sheepskin Association to fight the corporation's claim, arguing that "ugg" is a generic term referring to flat-heeled, pull-on sheepskin boots. They further argued that Australian manufacturers had been making and trading this style of boot for decades, including exporting them to the US. One of these manufacturers, Perth's Uggs-N-Rugs, who had been manufacturing uggs since 1978 and selling them online since 1996, appealed to Australian trademark regulators, IP Australia. The officer who heard the case stated that the "evidence overwhelmingly supports the proposition that the terms (ugg, ugh and ug boots) are interchangeably used to describe a specific style of sheepskin boot and are the first and most natural way in which to describe these goods." In 2006 Uggs-N-Rugs won the right to use the term UGG BOOT/S and variations such as UGH BOOT/S. The case was the subject of a 2006 television documentary, The Good, The Bad and The Ugg Boot. Counsel for Uggs-N-Rugs was David Stewart instructed by Wrays: Counsel for Deckers was Christian Dimitriadis instructed by Ashurst.

Deckers retained the rights to their UGG logo as trade mark protection only applies for the way the mark appears in its entirety and not for the words it contains. The name Ugg/UGG was determined to be generic after the Registrar of Trade Marks found that registration did not confer "rights in the generic term, or terms, from which it is derived" and that the identity of the various trade marks "derive from the hyphenated nature of the expression." Therefore, UGH boots, UG boots and UGG boots ("or other variations") without hyphens are all generic terms in Australia. IP Australia also ruled that the trademark "UGH-boots" (with hyphen) should be removed from the trademark register for non-use as Deckers had only been using the UGG logo, not the UGH marks. Deckers initially declined to pay Uggs-N-Rugs court costs as required by the 2006 ruling. Following the publication of a Wall Street Journal article which referred to the oversight, Deckers paid the costs in September 2010. The ruling only applies in Australia and Deckers still owns the trademarks in other jurisdictions such as the US, China, Japan and the European Union.

In 1998, Deckers demanded that the American company Koolaburra cease infringing the UGG trademark. Koolaburra replied that they did not use the name "UGG" or "UGH" and that the only mark they used was "Ug". Deckers sent a further "cease and desist" letter in 2001 and another in 2003 but Koolaburra declined to stop using the name "Ug" and in 2004, Deckers filed a case against Koolaburra in the California federal court alleging (1) trademark infringement, (2) false designation of origin (Koolaburra labelled their boots "Australian Ug Boots"), (3) trademark dilution, (4) cybersquatting, (5) unfair competition, (6) trade disparagement, (7) unjust enrichment and (8) breach of contract (Deckers claimed that in 1998 Koolaburra had agreed to stop using the name Ug). Koolaburra in turn challenged that the name UGG was generic and not entitled to trademark protection. As the UGG mark was registered, Deckers was entitled to the assumption that it was not generic, thus the burden of proof rested with Koolaburra.

In support, Koolaburra provided the testimony of America's National Surfing Team coach Peter Townend and Nordstrom's footwear buyer Heather Kolkey. These declarations were accepted by the court as anecdotal. Additionally, Koolaburra provided three instances of the generic usage of Ugg in American magazines; however, the court pointed out that the most recent was dated 1980. Koolaburra also quoted the New York City published Oxford English Dictionary definition of "Ugg"; however, this was rejected after Deckers petitioned the Dictionary to change the definition of "Ugg" from "a kind of soft sheepskin boot" to a definition that included UGG's trademark, which the OED agreed to do. Koolaburra then argued that the UGG trademark was invalid as Brian Smith had fraudulently registered the name by giving false representations that the term was not generic, arguing that "as an Australian citizen, Smith knew of the fact that the term Ugg was a generic term". This was rejected by the court as fraud requires an applicant to "knowingly" make the false representations, ruling that such belief was subjective, and finding that even if Smith knew the term was generic in Australia, he may have "honestly held [a] good faith belief" that it was not generic in the United States.

Deckers countered through submitting declarations from four professionals in the footwear industry who stated that "UGG" is widely recognized in the industry as a brand name, not a generic term and provided the court with survey evidence supporting that consumers in the US consider UGG to be a brand name; among women aged 18 to 45 who had purchased footwear valued over $100 in the last 12 months, 58% believed UGG was a brand name while only 11% thought it generic. Koolaburra then argued that the term was generic under the doctrine of "foreign equivalents" (Under U.S. law, a term used in another country that is considered generic in that country cannot be imported into the United States and used as a trademark). This was rejected as the doctrine only applied to terms in a foreign language. In February 2005, the court ruled for Deckers on their claims of "trademark infringement" and "unfair competition", finding that a consumer would likely be confused with the similarity in "appearance, sight and sound" between "Ug" and UGG" as the parties were marketing in direct competition with identical products. However, the court declined to rule on the validity of trademarks in Australia as it was considered inappropriate to interfere with another country's rulings.

The Australian Sheepskin Association is attempting to change the name UGG into a regional mark similar to that achieved for Champagne which would negate its trademark status in many jurisdictions. Deckers in response has focused on the fact that its UGG boots are made in China and not Australia. In 2012, sales of Deckers UGG boots totaled over US$630 million while the UGG brand, which now includes hats, scarves, gloves, slippers, casuals, jackets, coats, and handbags totaled over US$1 billion with 30% of sales outside of the United States.

=== Trademark infringement cases ===
- During a trademark infringement and trade dress case in 2008, a generic term defense was rejected by a Dutch court as not being applicable to counterfeit goods. The court also rejected La Cheapa's claim that as Australian companies believe "ugg" was a generic name, the "UGG AUSTRALIA" mark was not protected in the Benelux, noting that La Cheapa also admitted knowing that UGG in the Benelux is a famous brand which undermined their argument that UGG was generic. La Cheapa distributed sheepskin boots it had purchased from a supplier in China on an Internet site from the Netherlands, describing them on its website as "100% authentic Ugg Australian boots!!!", with "UGG logo on the heel" and in boxes virtually identical to Deckers packaging. These were found by the court to be counterfeits. The Deckers case had also included La Cheapa's sale of imported boots manufactured by Jumbo Ugg Boots Binder Production Pty Ltd in Melbourne, Australia branded Jumbo Uggs. The court stated that "given the exact similarity of the goods (namely: boots)" and the fact that the word "ugg" was part of the brand, and the undisputed fact that the "UGG brand" was popular in the Benelux, it found that the importation and distribution of sheepskin boots which contained the word "ugg" in its label took an "unfair advantage of, or is detrimental to, the distinctive character of the brand UGG" and was thus an infringement of the Deckers trademark.
- On December 25, 2010, Deckers filed a trademark infringement suit in a bid to stop Emu Australia from using the UGG name on its sales website. On December 30 Emu Australia counter-sued for the cancellation of Deckers' UGG trademark in the US. Emu's suit alleged that Deckers' trademark was obtained after a false statement to the US Patent and Trademark Office and was therefore invalid. On 25 August 2011, the case was dismissed with prejudice by stipulation of the parties but the terms of the settlement were not disclosed.
- In 2010, the validity of the UGG trademark was challenged in a Turkish court by a local manufacturer after his application to register a trademark containing the words UGGBOOTS and AUSTRALIA was rejected. Judge Verda Çiçekli ruled for Deckers, finding that UGG was not a generic term and did not have any descriptive nature in the Turkish language, except to refer to Deckers products. The court further ruled that UGG was a well-known trademark that has gained recognition and distinctiveness worldwide, and while acknowledging the challenger's allegations that UGG was a generic term in Australia, ruled that such alleged facts have no bearing on the validity of the trademark within Turkey. Deckers was also awarded costs in the action.
- In 2010, IP Australia ruled on the trademark opposition dispute between Deckers and Luda Production Pty Ltd, granting Luda the right to register the trademarks UGG AUSTRALIA (& Design) and MADE BY UGG AUSTRALIA with costs awarded against Deckers. Luda declared that the "element ugg" was used generically in the sheepskin boot market but that its use had not caused any confusion with Luda's UGG AUSTRALIA products. Luda began manufacturing ugg boots in 1981 and in 1982 began selling its boots with woven heel counters featuring the UGG AUSTRALIA mark. In 1984, the company was incorporated at which time Luda had attempted to trademark its UGG AUSTRALIA logo but was asked by the Trade Mark Office not to proceed as the name was "descriptive" and was therefore not registerable. In 2004, Luda filed another trademark application after becoming aware of "other products being sold bearing variations of the element UGG" in conjunction with the word "Australia." Deckers opposed the application on three grounds, prior use (Deckers argued that the prior use shown by Luda was invalid as the mark they sought to register was not "an exact copy" of the mark they used), that Deckers had a more significant reputation in Australia and that Luda had filed the application in bad faith. The court found that Deckers did not have a significant reputation in an Australian market which was dominated by Luda Productions, and thus failed the requirements of the Trade Practices Act, regarding public misapprehension of the origin of the manufacturer. The court noted that Luda's use of the term "UGG AUSTRALIA" predated Deckers' infringement defense by 22 years, which negated Deckers' claim that Luda was trading upon their reputation and that Luda had not filed in bad faith, but in order to gain statutory protection for trade marks already recognized in Australia. Regarding a non-use action between Deckers and Luda Production Pty, IP Australia confirmed that Deckers owned the trademark of their UGG AUSTRALIA label (with sun-like device); however, the scope of Deckers' trademark was narrowed, restricted to just footwear.
- In 2011, Deckers filed suit against the Chinese company Dangdang for allegedly selling counterfeit Uggs at the Jingdong Mall and on Taobao, a Chinese language website similar to eBay and Amazon. Known as "snow boots" in China, Dangdang had been selling Australian made boots labeled Merino World UGG. In defense, a spokesperson from Jingdong Mall argued that the boots were a different brand to Deckers with the letters in the word "UGG" designed differently. In support, he cited Baidu Baike, the Chinese online encyclopedia, which describes Ugg as a generic term for sheepskin boots. Asked to comment, the media and public relations Manager of the Australian Trade Commission attached to the Australian Embassy in Shanghai, Anthony-Yan stated that the snow boots style originated in Australia where all such boots are referred to as UGG boots. The Australian manufacturers' logos contained the word "UGG" in large block letters on the heel of the boot, and the court found that this practice deceived the ordinary consumer. The court ruled that use of the word "ugg" in Chinese commerce was an infringement of the Deckers Chinese "UGG" trademark, and held the manufacturers and distribution firms liable.
  The Shanghai suburb of Gaoqiao is the nation's largest production base for snow boots with more than 200 businesses manufacturing footwear valued at more than 1 billion yuan (US$163 million) annually; it is also "the nation's largest production base for imitation UGG brands," with an estimated 150 companies producing counterfeit UGGs. Deckers UGG boots cost from 1,500 to 8,000 yuan (US$240 to US$1,300) in China when demand exceeded supply in 2011, which led to a large market for both counterfeit UGGs and the lower priced uggs imported from Australia.
- In 2016, Sydney-based small business Australian Leather was sued by Deckers in a Chicago court, alleging infringement of the UGG trademark due to 12 pairs of ugg boots sold online to American customers, 4 of which were purchased by Deckers employees. The company was represented by former Australian senator Nick Xenophon. In 2019, the court ordered Australian Leather to pay US$450,000 in damages and approximately US$3 million in defendant's legal fees. Australian Leather appealed to the US Supreme Court, with the Australian federal government filing a friend of the court brief in support. However, the Supreme Court declined to hear the appeal.
