= Lopker =

Lopker is a surname. Notable people with the surname include:

- Karl F. Lopker (1951–2018), American businessman
- Pamela Lopker, American businesswoman

== See also ==
- Locker (surname)
