= Bearpaw (brand) =

Footwear brand

Bearpaw Holdings LLC
- Founded: 2001
- Founder: Tom Romeo
- Headquarters: Citrus Heights, California, U.S.
- Key people: Colby Rodriguez (President)
- Products: Footwear, apparel, and accessories
- Website: bearpaw.com

Bearpaw Holdings LLC (simply known as Bearpaw, stylized BEARPAW) is an American brand of footwear, apparel, and accessories.

== History ==
The brand was founded by Tom Romeo in 2001 with the purpose of, according to its website, redefining casual footwear by utilizing sheepskin to create comfortable and stylish footwear. In one of the most competitive footwear market segments, with UGG Australia and EMU Australia as main competitors for producing sheepskin footwear, Bearpaw has carved out a niche area. The first Bearpaw retail store opened in Citrus Heights, California in 2011, where the brand is headquartered.

In 2018, the brand started producing vegan made boots (non-sheepskin), specifically with vegan microsuede (polyester), polyester blend lining, and rubber outsoles.

In June 2018, Bearpaw acquired Flip Flop Shops, a brand owned by Cherokee Inc.

== Products ==
Bearpaw's signature products are its sheepskin boots, otherwise known as ugg boots, which come in various styles and colors. The brand also produces hiking boots, slippers, sneakers, apparel and accessories for men, women and children.

== Legal issues ==
In November 2010, Deckers Outdoor Corporation, which owns the UGG Australia brand, filed a lawsuit against the Bearpaw brand for copying UGG brand designs (both Bearpaw and UGG Australia produce immensely similar products, especially their sheepskin boots). The litigation was resolved mutually by both parties in February 2012.

Tom Romeo faced legal trouble in 2014, when he was charged by a federal grand jury of Sacramento, California for evading nearly $5.6 million in customs duties, where his employees created false invoices that undervalued footwear he imported from China.
