= Hoka =

Athletic shoe company from France

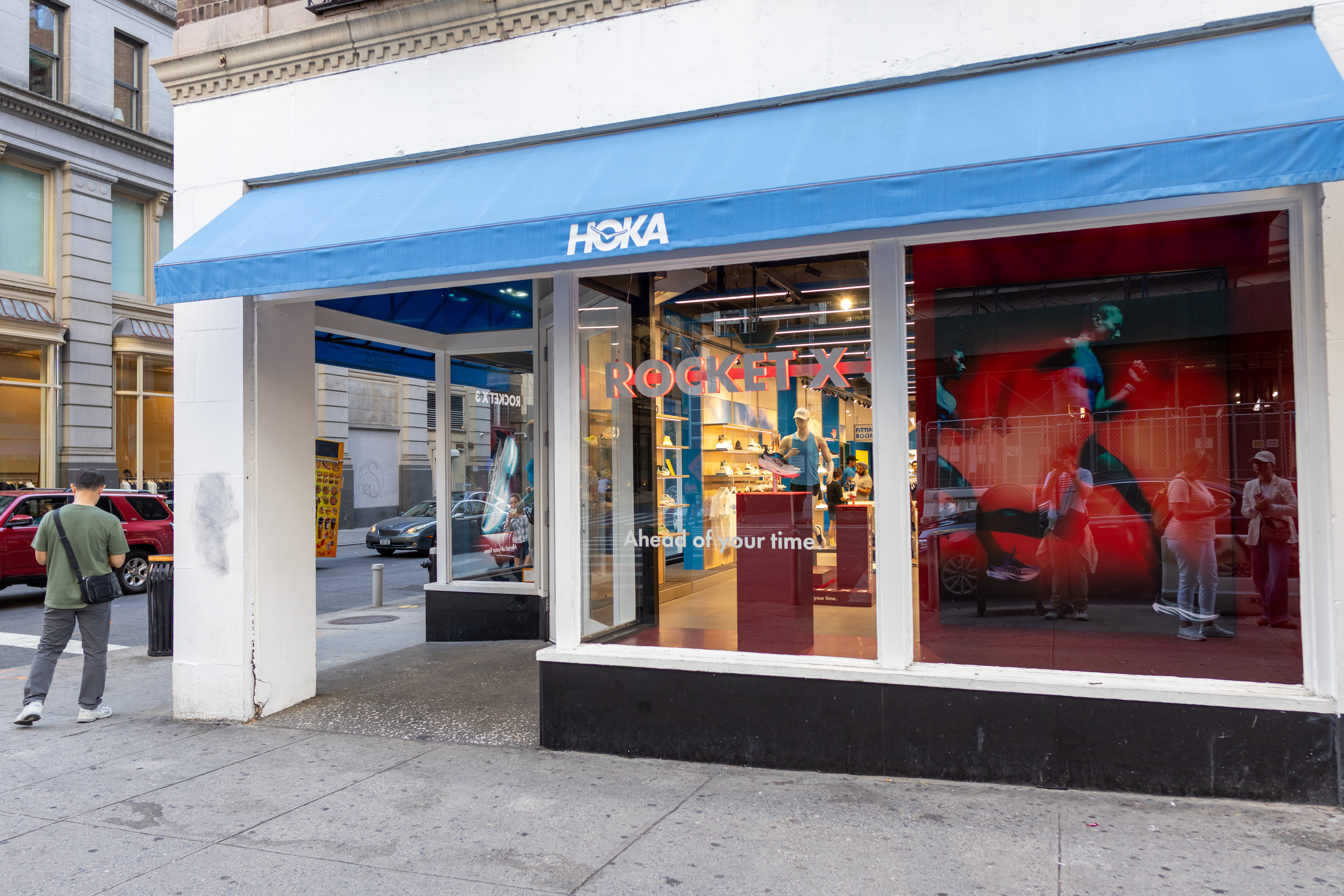
- A Hoka store in Flatiron, New York.
- Formerly: Hoka One One
- Type: Subsidiary
- Industry: Sportswear; Sports equipment
- Founded: 2009; 17 years ago
- Founder: Nicolas Mermoud; Jean-Luc Diard
- Headquarters: Goleta, California
- Area served: Worldwide
- Key people: Stefano Caroti, President; Steven Doolan, VP; Gretchen Weimer, CMO
- Products: Athletic shoes
- Revenue: ▲US$1.8 billion (2024)
- Parent: Deckers Brandson
- Website: hoka.com

Hoka (stylized as HOKA and formerly known as Hoka One One, pronounced “O-nay, O-nay”) is an American sportswear company that designs and markets running shoes. It was founded in 2009 in Annecy, France, and had been based in Richmond, California, United States, before it was acquired by Deckers Brands in 2013. Hoka first gained attention in the running industry by producing shoes with oversized midsoles, dubbed "maximalist" shoes, in contrast to the minimalist shoe trend that was gaining popularity at the time.

== History ==
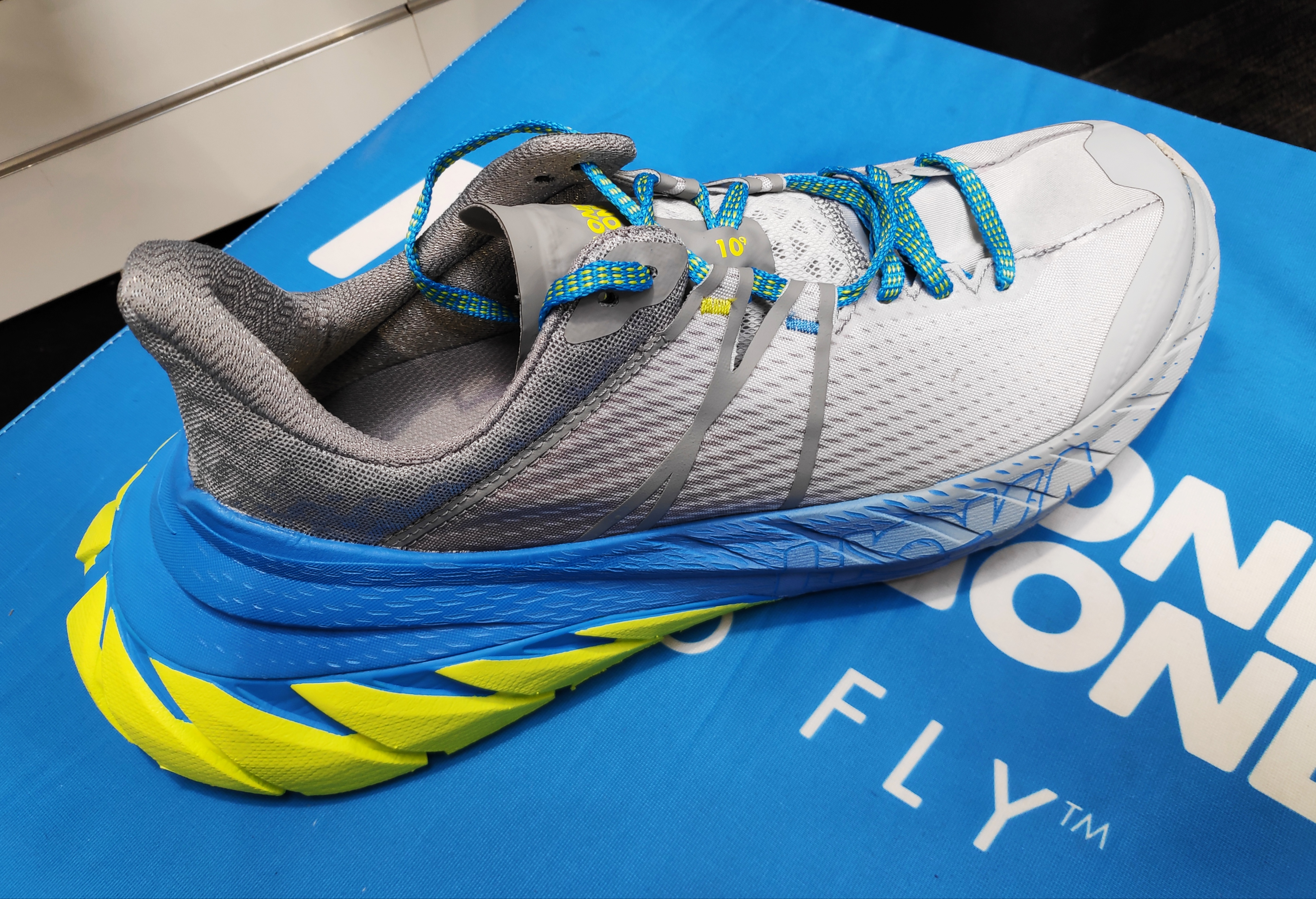
Hoka "Tennine" Shoe

The company was founded in 2009 by Nicolas Mermoud and Jean-Luc Diard, former Salomon employees. They sought to design a shoe that allowed for faster downhill running, and created a model with an oversized outsole that had more cushioning than other running shoes at the time. The shoes are named after a Māori term meaning "to fly".

The shoes were initially embraced by ultramarathon runners due to their enhanced cushion and inherent stability; however, they quickly gained popularity among other runners for offering maximum cushion and minimal weight. The brand's original, highest-cushion models are now accompanied in the Hoka lineup by lighter-weight shoes that retain much of the brand's cushion, include lightweight training and racing shoes, and track spikes.

Hoka was purchased on April 1, 2013, by Deckers Brands, the parent company for UGG, Teva and other footwear brands.

On December 22, 2021, Hoka announced that they were rebranding, with their business name changing from Hoka One One to simply Hoka.

== Products and sponsorships ==
Hoka produces low-profile and max-cushion shoes for road, trail, and all-terrain; throughout its product line, it retains features like a low weight-to-cushion ratio and midsole and outsole geometry designed to promote inherent stability and an efficient stride.

Hoka sponsors runners, including the NAZ Elite professional training group.

== Spikes ==
Hoka released their first set of middle-distance running spikes in 2016 called the Speed Evo R. Their first notable use was at the 2016 U.S. Olympic Trials where Hoka-sponsored runners wore them in competition. The Speed Evo R was designed to enhance runners' traction around the curve by placing the spikes asymmetrically between the feet. The spikes were also designed so the plate rises up the midsole toward the heel and points right, preventing the foot from shifting inside the shoe.
