= Doug Otto =

American businessman

- Born: Douglas B. Otto; 1951 (age 74–75)
- Education: University of California, Santa Barbara (B.A. 1973)
- Occupation: Business executive
- Years active: 1973–2008
- Employer: Deckers Outdoor Corporation
- Board member of: The Whale Beach Foundation
- Spouse: Rita Otto
- Children: 3

Douglas B. Otto (born 1951) is a business executive who co-founded Deckers Outdoor Corporation whose portfolio includes the UGG Australia brand.

== Early life and education ==
Otto was born in 1951 to two high school educators. He attended and graduated from the University of California, Santa Barbara with a B.A. in business economics in 1973.

== Deckers Outdoor Corporation ==
While at UCSB in 1973, Otto began producing sandals with classmate Karl F. Lopker.

He really invented the modern flip-flop we know today, the neoprene rubber with parachute webbing. They were called Deckers.

— Angel Martinez, Deckers President and CEO

The duo, with Otto handling sales and distribution while Lopker oversaw manufacturing, based the company on durable, long-lasting sandals which catered to the surf community. After buying out Lopker in 1982, Otto decided to license and manufacture other companies' product which resulted in a 1985 agreement with Teva.

Deckers went public in October 1993 and in 1995 acquired UGG Australia. The move, engineered by Otto, has been described as a "... brilliant and lucrative business maneuver..." and "one of the great success stories within the consumer category." The UGG brand, with Deckers, gained market traction slowly, but after an Oprah Winfrey feature on a "Favorite Things show sales and popularity increased dramatically. UGGs soon became a fashion trend ingrained in popular culture with celebrities such as Kate Moss, Katy Perry, Gisele Bündchen, and Sarah Michelle Gellar all wearing the brand as well as being shown on Sex and the City.

Otto retired from Deckers in 2008, but revenue continued to climb and first hit $1 billion US dollars in 2010.

== Personal life ==
Doug Otto is married to Rita Otto and has three children. He is currently the President and Chairman of the Board for The Whale Beach Foundation, roles he has held since 1994. He was honored by UC Santa Barbara in 2009 with its "Distinguished Alumni" award, joining his Deckers Corporation co-founder Karl Lopker who was a 1998 honoree.
