= Lecker =

Lecker is a surname. Notable people with the surname include:

- Michael Lecker (born 1951), Israeli scholar and professor
- Robert Lecker (born 1951), Canadian scholar and professor

== See also ==
- Lecker, a song on Zunge by Till Lindemann
- Locker (surname)
- Lucker (surname)
