= Uggs-N-Rugs =

Small business in Perth, Australia

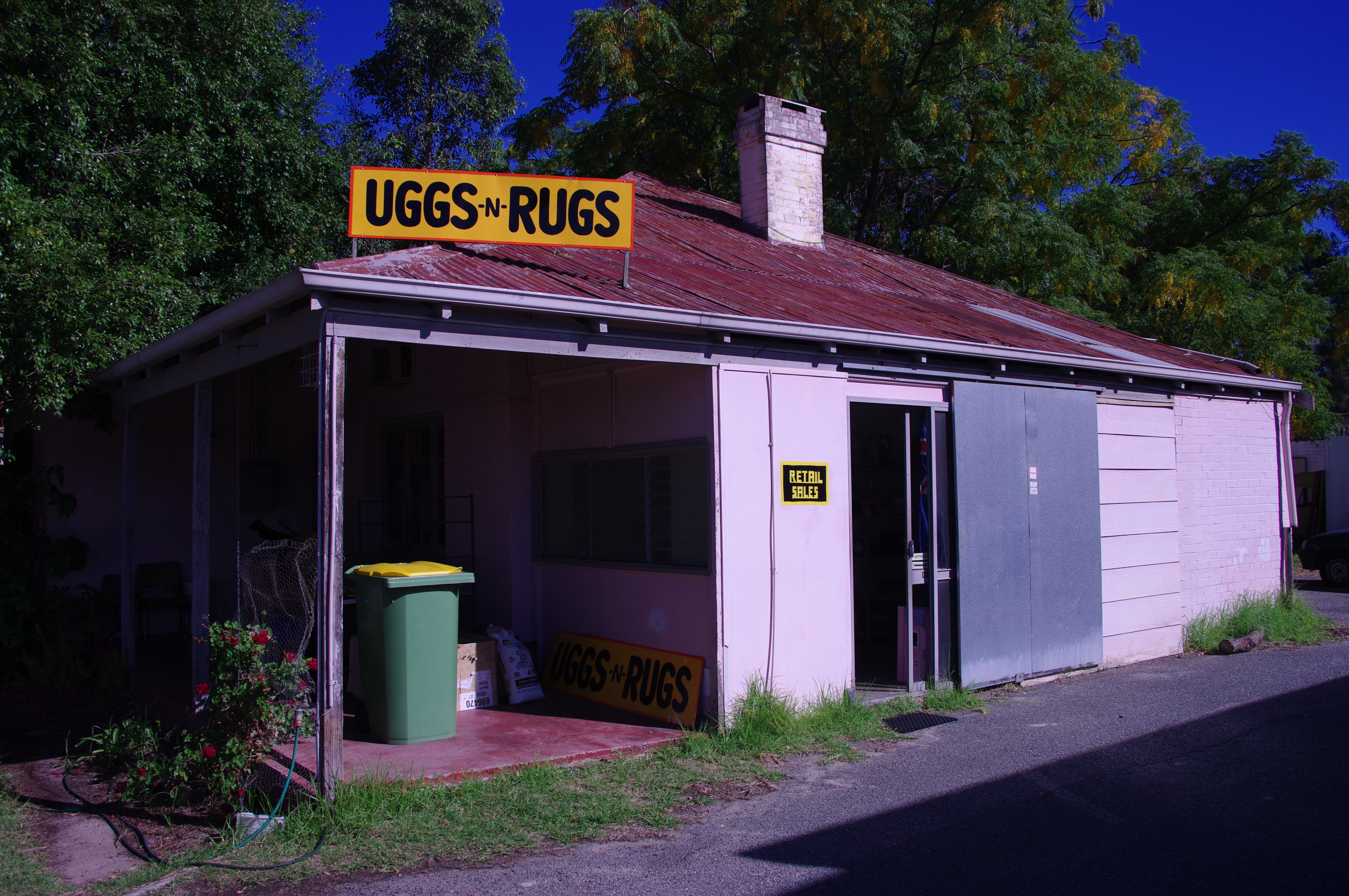
Uggs-N-Rugs workshop in Kenwick, Western Australia

Uggs-N-Rugs is a small business in Perth, Western Australia, manufacturing and retailing ugg boots. In 2006 Uggs-N-Rugs successfully challenged the registration of ugg/ug/ugh as a trade mark in Australia and continues to challenge the trademark registration through the Australian Sheepskin Association.

== History ==
Uggs-N-Rugs was formed in the late 1970s by Bruce and Bronwyn McDougall, who had recently finished farming in Quindanning. Initially, the company purchased pre-made ugg boots for retail. The McDougalls deemed the quality to be substandard, so they began to manufacture the boots themselves.

== Ugg boot trademarks ==
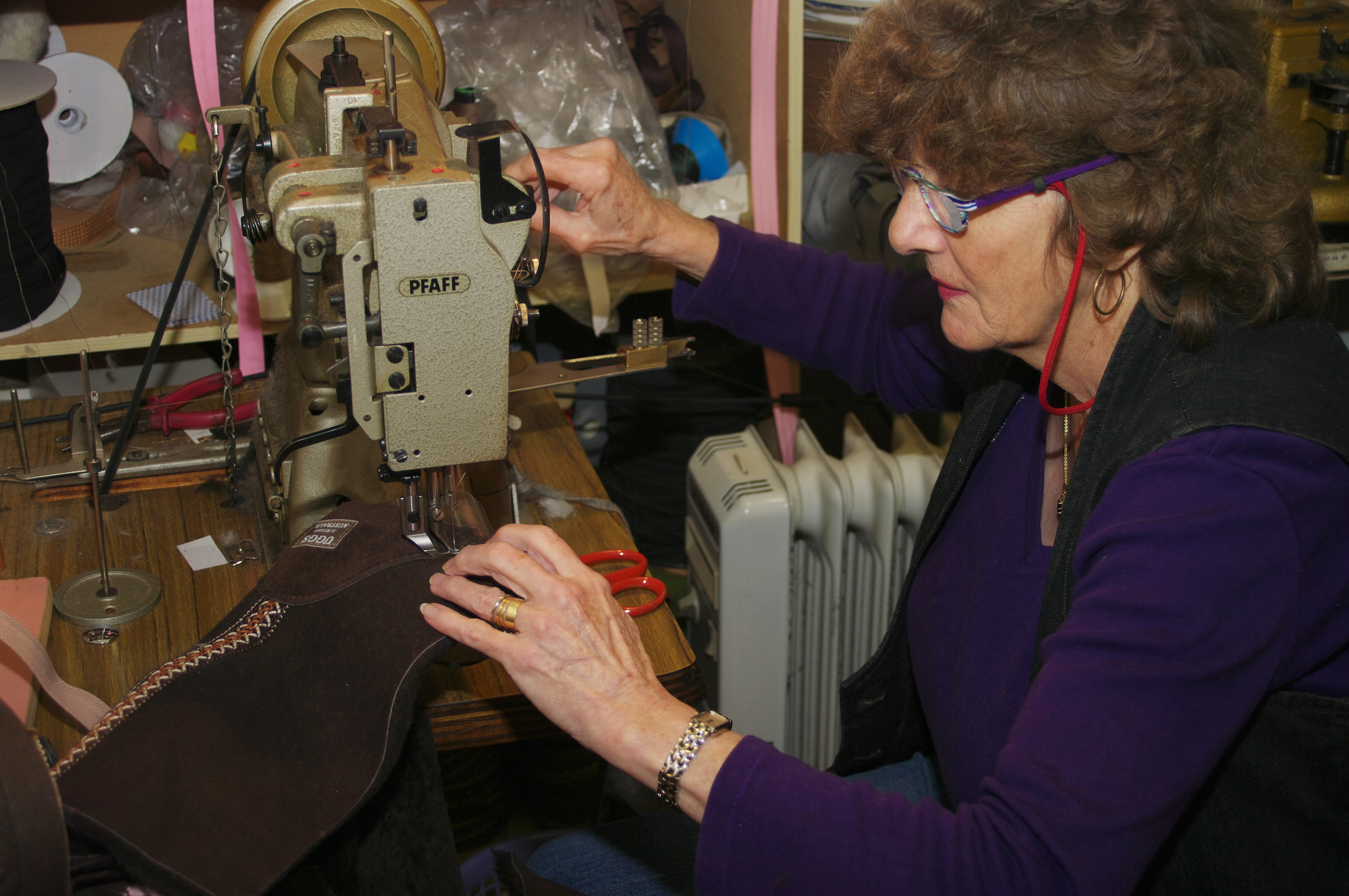
Bronwyn McDougall making a pair of ugg boots in 2010

The McDougalls and Uggs-N-Ruggs have been featured in Australian media reports from 2005-2006 due to their tussle with Deckers Outdoor Corporation and their registered trademarks. In early 2006 Uggs-N-Rugs was successful in having the Australian trademarks for ug, ugh and ugg removed from the register for non-use. IP Australia (the Australian trade marks office) declared that the words are interchangeable and used generically to describe sheepskin boots. As part of their action the McDougalls provided volumes of evidence showing the term (and its derivatives) being used in a generic sense. In addition, they showed that Deckers Outdoor Corporation failed to use their trademark properly and consistently. This battle was portrayed in the documentary, The Good, The Bad and The Ugg Boot which showed the action set an important precedent in trademark law. After the action was finalised, IP Australia published a clarification on their rulings highlighting the need for more due diligence to be performed by both the registering party and International Intellectual Property registrars before registering a trademark.
