= Sheepskin boots =

Footwear made of sheepskin

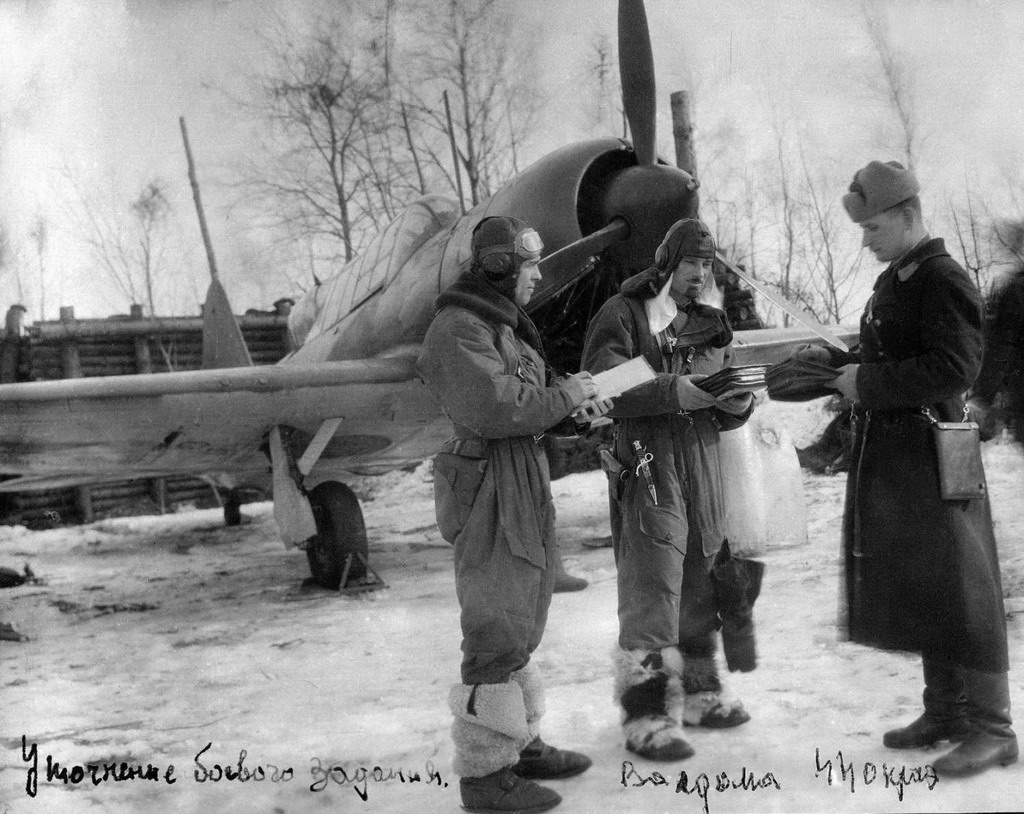
Sheepskin boots worn by a Soviet aviator during World War II.

Sheepskin boots are boots made from sheepskin. The wool on sheepskin has good insulating properties and so such boots are commonly worn when it is cold.

Sheepskin boots have been worn and used in colder climates since at least 500 B.C. as a Mummy in Subashi, China, has been uncovered wearing a pair. In ancient Greece, Plato wrote that most people would wrap their feet in warm felt and sheepskin during the hard winters in Potidaea. In the 19th century, traveller William Knight observed sheepskin boots being worn by the people of Tibet. Women dancers wore boots of variegated colours while male horsemen wore large boots along with heavy sheepskin trousers and coats. The Inuit of the Arctic use sheepskin to make warm boots which have names such as kamipak or marnguaq. These are oiled to make them waterproof. In the Russian winter, the peasants often wore high boots lined with sheepskin to stay warm.

Sheepskin boots were made in Glastonbury by the Quaker firm of Morlands. These were popular and successful in the early days of motoring, as open-topped vehicles were cold and windy. Morland boots were used by the expedition of Sir Edmund Hillary which was the first to climb Mount Everest in 1953. The boots were not used for climbing but for warmth when the climbers were resting.

Aviators need warm clothing if their aircraft are unpressurised and the heating is inadequate. Sheepskin jackets, helmets and boots were commonly used for this purpose in the 20th century. During World War I, Major Lanoe Hawker designed thigh-length sheepskin flying boots which were made for him by Harrods. These became popular in the Royal Flying Corps where they were known as fug boots. These were superseded by the 1930 and 1936 Pattern boot followed by the introduction of the Sidcot suit and more ordinary knee-length fleece-lined boots were then used. Arctic pilots needed especially warm wear and continued to use heavy suspender boots of sheepskin in place of trousers. Both clothing and boots were electrically heated as the technology for this became available.

In Australia, a soft, slip-on sheepskin boot was developed which were known as ugg boots (There are a number or derivations given for this name, including a cartoon character, shorthand for "ugly", and the "fug" boots worn in World War I). This became popular with surfers for warming their feet after surfing in the cold winter sea. The UGG Australia brand was imported to the USA where they were sold in speciality retailers such as surf shops. They then became popular with actors, actresses and influential celebrities such as Paris Hilton, Leonardo DiCaprio and Oprah Winfrey so sales boomed. There is fierce competition for this market with rival brands such as EMU Australia.

Sheepskin boots are used in nursing for bedridden patients to prevent bedsores, especially at the heel.

== See also ==
- Fur clothing
- List of shoe styles
