= Palm Bay Imports, Inc. v. Veuve Clicquot Ponsardin Maison Fondee en 1772 =

- Court: United States Court of Appeals for the Federal Circuit
- Full case name: Palm Bay Imports, Inc. v. Veuve Clicquot Ponsardin Maison Fondee en 1772
- Decided: February 9, 2005
- Citation: 396 F.3d 1369

Court membership
- Judges sitting: Paul Redmond Michel, Randall Ray Rader, Sharon Prost

Case opinions
- Majority: Rader, joined by unanimous

Palm Bay Imports, Inc. v. Veuve Clicquot Ponsardin Maison Fondee en 1772, 396 F.3d 1369 (Fed. Cir. 2005), was a case decided by the United States Court of Appeals for the Federal Circuit clarifying the doctrine of foreign equivalents. The court explained that there is a threshold limitation to applying the doctrine of foreign equivalents. The doctrine "should be applied only when it is likely that the ordinary American purchaser would 'stop and translate [the word] into its English equivalent.'"
