= Pamela Lopker =

American businesswoman

- Education: University of California, Santa Barbara
- Known for: Founder and chairman of software company QAD Inc.
- Spouse: Karl F. Lopker

Pamela Meyer Lopker was the founder, chairman of the board, and president of the software company QAD Inc.

== Early life and education ==
Lopker was born in Japan in 1962 as the second child of three. Her father was an engineer for the U.S. Navy, and as a result, Lopker attended 8 Catholic schools in 12 years; she and her family continue to be active members of the Catholic Church. Lopker’s family eventually settled in Cupertino, California where she was the first student at her school to earn an A in her auto shop class.

In 1972, Lopker started college at the University of California, Santa Barbara (UCSB) as a mathematics and economics major. She is also certified in Product and Inventory Management by the American Production and Inventory Control Society.

== Career ==
After graduating from college in 1977, Lopker worked writing software that provided radar defense systems for a Naval defense contractor in Goleta, California. She eventually left that job and pursued a career in business oriented software development.

In 1979, Karl F. Lopker, Lopker’s UCSB classmate and boyfriend, asked her to help him find software to track the sales, inventory, and shipments of his sandal company, Deckers Outdoors. After finding a lack of suitable software, she decided to start her own company, QAD, that would develop software to deal with all facets of manufacturing. Lopker says that she named the company using the initials of the nearby Queen Anne Road. Since the name QAR was already in use, Lopker replaced the R with a D. Shortly after QAD was founded, Mr. Lopker sold his company Deckers Outdoors and joined QAD as CEO. Mr. Lopker focused on sales and marketing, while Lopker was responsible for research and development.

In 2005, QAD was in use in over 90 countries by more than 5,000 manufacturers, had $230 million in revenue, and 1,200 employees.

Fortune magazine has named Lopker “The Hero of U.S. Manufacturing” and “The Queen of Elegant Software.” She has also been called “A Legend of Manufacturing” by Manufacturing Systems. In 1997, Lopker was inducted into the Women in Technology Hall of Fame.

== Personal life ==
In 1981, Lopker married friend and business partner Karl Lopker with whom she has 2 children. In 2018, Karl died of prostate cancer.

Lopker and her husband gave a $500,000 endowment to UCSB in 2005 and are also actively involved with their alma mater UC Santa Barbara through other means such as mentorship and acting as guest lecturers.
