= Karl F. Lopker =

American business executive (1951–2018)

- Born: Karl Francis Lopker; December 19, 1951; Los Angeles, California, U.S.
- Died: August 25, 2018 (aged 66); Santa Barbara, California, U.S.
- Education: University of California, Santa Barbara (B.S. 1973)
- Occupation: Business executive
- Years active: 1981–2018
- Employer: QAD Inc
- Title: CEO
- Spouse: Pamela Lopker (m. 1981)
- Children: 2

Karl Francis Lopker (December 19, 1951 – August 25, 2018) was an American business executive who was CEO of QAD Inc and a co-founder of Deckers Outdoor Corporation.

== Early life and education ==
Lopker was born in Los Angeles, California, and grew up in Downey, California. He attended Don Bosco Technical Institute and matriculated at the University of California, Santa Barbara from which he graduated with a B.S. in electrical engineering in 1973.

== Deckers Outdoor Corporation ==
While a senior at UCSB, Lopker with fellow UCSB student Doug Otto created Deckers Outdoor Corporation in 1973. Lopker oversaw manufacturing of the production while Otto was responsible for sales and distribution. Despite a growing company, Lopker decided he wanted to work in software and was bought out by Otto in 1982. He joined QAD Inc as CEO, a company his wife, Pamela Lopker, founded.

== QAD ==
Despite working at Deckers at the time, Lopker urged then-girlfriend Pamela to start QAD Inc. The Lopkers made the decision to write one of their software programs to be able to run on multiple computers, launching their program, MFG/PRO, and the company to international success. MFG/PRO was also the first manufacturing software program to use UNIX. Lopker also made the decision to recruit PeopleSoft employees after their Oracle acquisition and subsequent layoffs.

== UC Santa Barbara affiliation ==
In addition to attending college at UCSB, Lopker and his wife were both honored by the UC Santa Barbara Alumni Association's "Distinguished Alumni Award" in 1998. The Lopkers made a major donation to the university which resulted in the first endowed chair in computer science at the College of Engineering.

== Personal life and death ==
Lopker married business partner and UCSB alumnae, Pamela Meyer, in 1981 and would later have two children. On August 25, 2018, Lopker died of prostate cancer, 13 years after diagnosis.
