= Ugg boots =

Type of sheepskin boot from Australia

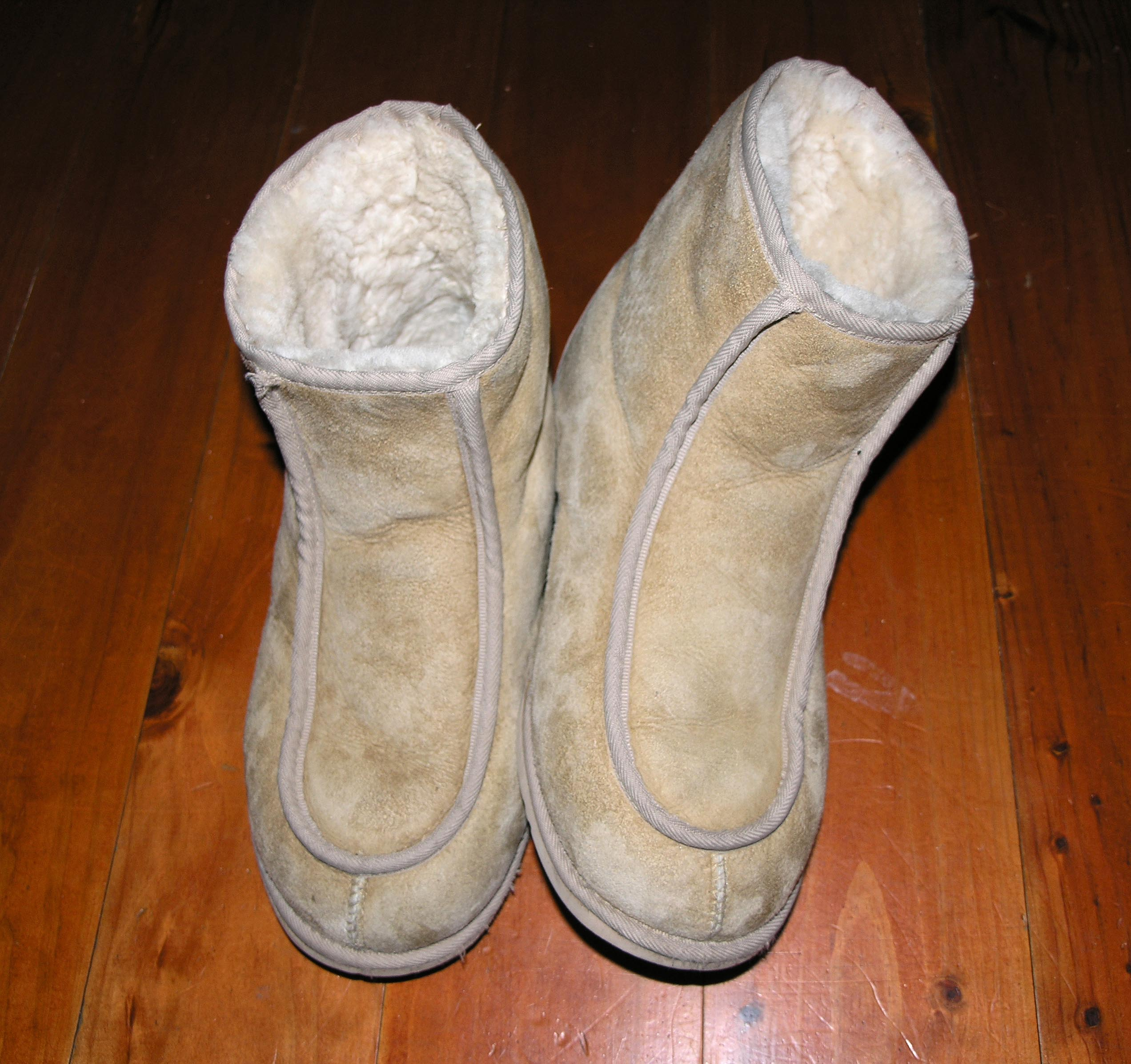
A pair of ugg boots

Ugg boots are a unisex style of sheepskin boot or slipper originating in Australia. The boots are typically made of twin-faced sheepskin with fleece on the inside, a tanned outer surface and a synthetic sole. The term "ugg boots" originated in Australia, initially for utilitarian footwear worn for warmth, and which were often worn by surfers during the 1960s. In the 1970s, the boots were introduced to the surf culture of the United Kingdom and the United States. Sheepskin boots became a fashion trend in the U.S. in the late 1990s and a worldwide trend in the mid-2000s. In Australia, they are worn predominantly as slippers and often associated with daggy fashion sense and bogan culture.

Prior legal disputes between some manufacturers of sheepskin boots arose as to distinguish whether "ugg" is a protected trademark, or a generic term and thus ineligible for trademark protection. There are more than 70 registered trademarks that include the term "ugg" in various logos and designs in Australia and New Zealand, as the term is considered a generic reference to a type of shoe. Outside Australia and New Zealand, UGG is a brand manufactured by the California-based Deckers Outdoor Corporation, with most of its manufacturing based in China and with registered trademarks in over 130 countries worldwide including the US, UK, Canada, all European Union members, and China. Despite the difference in capitalisation and pronunciation (e.g., yew-gee-gee in China), Deckers Corporation actively asserts its "UGG" trade mark against Australian traders who sell their "ugg boots" overseas.

Noteworthy manufacturers in Australia and New Zealand are EMU Australia, Uggs-N-Rugs and Ugg Australia. While Deckers is often referred to as the leading manufacturer of the footwear style outside Australia, Deckers refers to its boots as the "UGG-brand" boot, and associates it with a "California lifestyle". Following an investigation by the Australian Competition & Consumer Commission into allegedly misleading and deceptive use of "Australia" in its branding, Deckers has rebranded from "UGG Australia" to "UGG".

== History ==
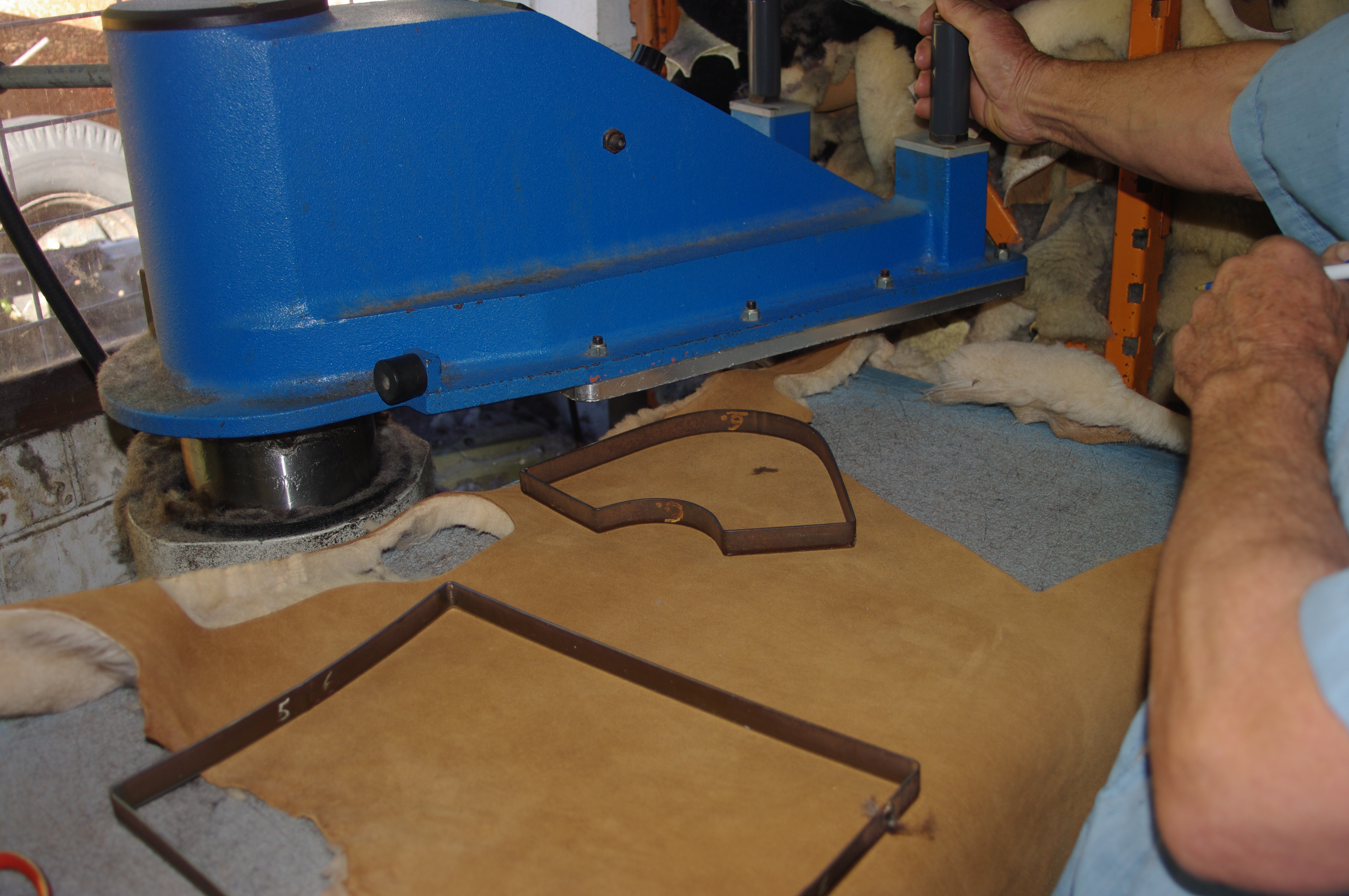
Cutting boot pieces from a sheepskin using a cutting press

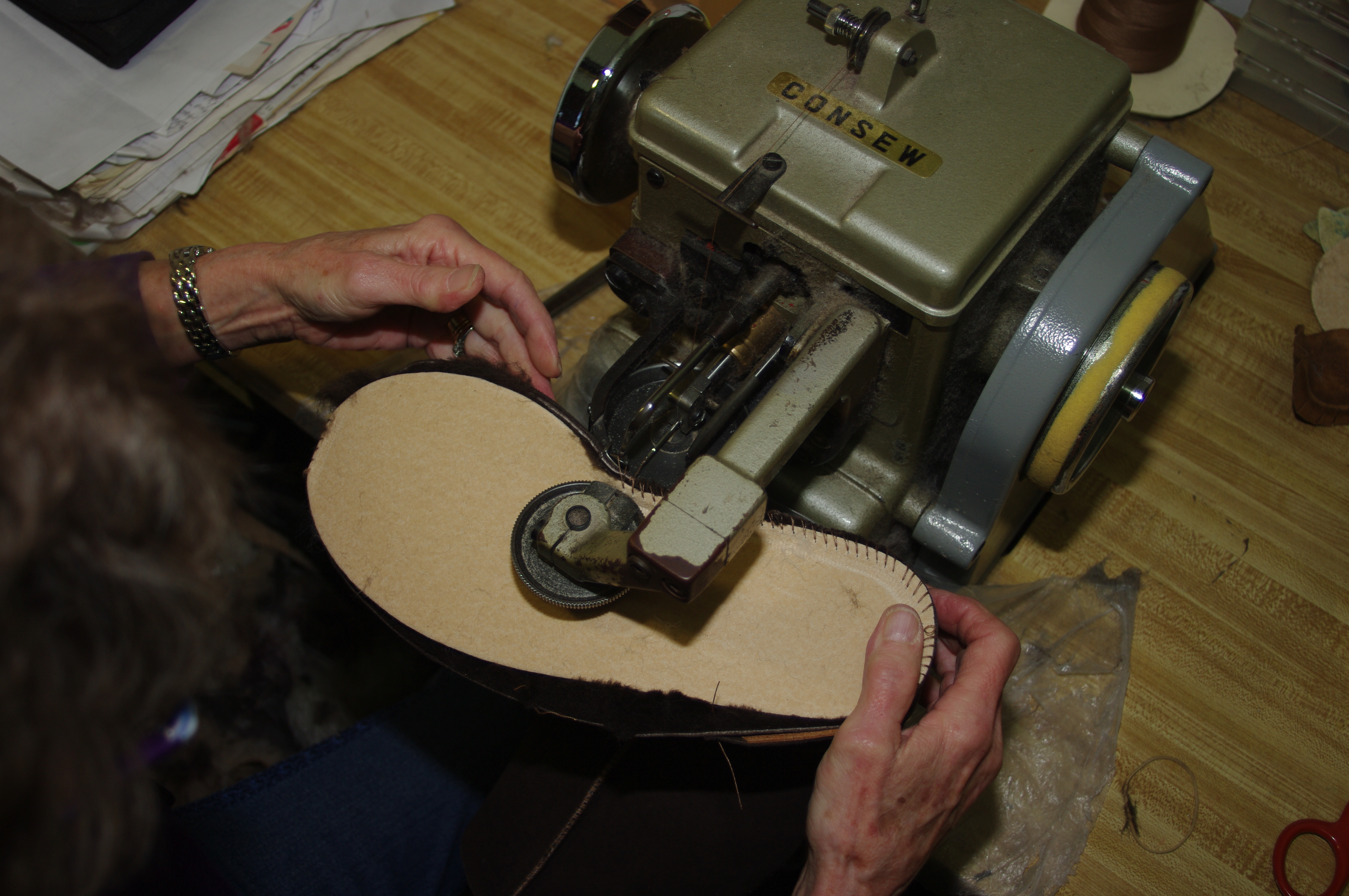
Stitching the innersole of an Australian ugg boot

There are different claims to the origins of the ugg boot style. Artisanal sheepskin boots were known in rural Australia during the 1920s, and were reportedly worn by shearers as they found them resistant to wool yolk (lanolin), which would rot their ordinary boots. However, when commercial manufacturing began remains unclear. The boots were reportedly being manufactured in 1933 by Blue Mountains Ugg Boots of New South Wales. Frank Mortel of Mortels Sheepskin Factory has stated that he began manufacturing the boots in the late 1950s. Surfer Shane Stedman of Australia has stated in interviews that he invented the ugg boot. Perth sheepskin boot manufacturers Bruce and Bronwyn McDougall of Uggs-N-Rugs have manufactured the boots since the late 1970s.

The origin of the term "ugg" is also unclear. Stedman registered the trademark "UGH-BOOTS" in Australia in 1971, and in 1982 registered the "UGH" trademark. Frank Mortel claims that he named his company's sheepskin boots "ugg boots" in 1958 after his wife commented that the first pair he made were "ugly." Some accounts have suggested that the term grew out of earlier variations, such as the "fug boots" worn by Royal Air Force pilots during World War I.

The 1970s saw the emergence of advertising using the UGG and UGH terms both in trade names and as a generic term in Australia. The Macquarie Dictionary of the Australian language first included a definition for "ugg boot" as a generic term for sheepskin boots in its 1981 edition. (After Stedman complained to the editors of Macquarie, subsequent editions indicated that "UGH" was a trade mark.)

In the 1970s, ugg boots became popular among competitive surfers. Sheepskin footwear accounts for around 10 percent of footwear production in Australia.

=== International sales ===
Surfing helped popularise the boots outside Australia and New Zealand. Advertisements for Australian sheepskin boots first appeared in Californian surf magazines in 1970. By the mid-1970s, several surf shops in Santa Cruz, California and the San Fernando Valley were selling a limited number of boots purchased by the shops' owners while visiting surfing events in Australia. In 1978, a Western Australian manufacturer of sheepskin boots, Country Leather, advertised outside Australia for distributors to sell its sheepskin boots, which were made from sheepskin sourced from Jackson's Tannery in Geelong, Victoria. Seeing the popularity of the boots among American surfers, Australian surfer Brian Smith, then living in Santa Monica, California, and colleague Doug Jensen bought boots from Country Leather but were unhappy with the brand and decided to register UGG as their own trademark. Family friends invested $20,000 into the new venture and the group set up Ugg Imports. Due to other business commitments, in 1979 Jensen handed over his share of the company to Smith. In 1987 Smith registered Ugg Holdings Inc. and in 1985 registered a U.S. trademark on a ram's head logo with the words "Original UGG Boot UGG Australia." In 1995, Ugg Holdings purchased Stedman's various trademarks. As for the ugg name, Smith stated: "We always called them uggs, long before it was trademarked."

Shoe manufacturer Hide & Feet in Newquay, England began manufacturing sheepskin boots in 1973, and in 1990 Nick Whitworth and his wife Kath bought the business and registered "UGG" as a trade mark in the UK. Due to increasing popularity and sales, in 1991 the company changed its name to "The Original Ugg Co." In 1999, Whitworth sold the company name and the British UGG trade mark to Deckers Outdoor Corporation, renaming his company the Celtic Sheepskin Company.

By 1994, UGG boots had grown in status among surfers in California with 80% of sales in southern Orange County where Ugg Holdings saw an increase in sales of 60 percent on the previous season. Smith's UGG boots gained international exposure when they were worn by the United States Olympic team in Lillehammer for the 1994 Winter Olympics. Australian manufacturers also saw an increase in exports of sheepskin boots to the United States, although Ugg Holdings retained an estimated 80% market share. By the end of the year, Country Leather had opened its own shop in Redondo Beach to promote an expansion of the brand from its established surf market into mainstream footwear sales and Ugg Holdings began sourcing UGG boots directly from Jackson's Tannery, which had changed its name to EMU Australia. In early 1995, Smith promoted the UGG AUSTRALIA brand on the Rush Limbaugh show, which spurred sales while the brand gained further exposure when the San Diego Chargers started wearing them. According to retailers, it was not just the footwear that attracted consumers, but the "made in Australia" tie-in as the boots were a unique product only available from Australia and Australian products were at that time very popular. In August 1995, Smith sold Ugg Holdings to Deckers Outdoor Corporation for $14.6 million. In 1996 Deckers registered the various trademarks for "UGG" in the U.S.

Australian ugg boots are not considered fashionable in their countries of origin and are worn for warmth and comfort. Ugg boots in Australia are worn predominantly as slippers and associated with daggy fashion sense, bogan behaviour and the outer suburbs when worn in public. According to Australian fashion stylist Justin Craig: "The only people who get away with wearing them are models, who give out the message: 'I'm so beautiful, I can look good in any crap.'" The Deckers UGG brand emerged as a fashion trend in the US through Deckers' actions to promote it as a high fashion brand. Deckers solicited endorsements from celebrities such as Kate Hudson, Sarah Jessica Parker, Cameron Diaz, Leonardo DiCaprio and Jennifer Lopez, and product placements in television series such as Sex and the City, and films such as Raising Helen. This marketing campaign "led to an exponential growth in the brand's popularity and recognizability." The company reported US$689 million in UGG sales in 2008, almost a 50-fold increase from 1995. Deckers aggressively pursues sales of ugg boots by Australian traders overseas. In 2010, worldwide sales of ugg boots by Australian manufacturers combined equalled only 5.9% of Deckers "UGG"-branded sheepskin boots sales, with UGG dominating the world market.

== Design ==
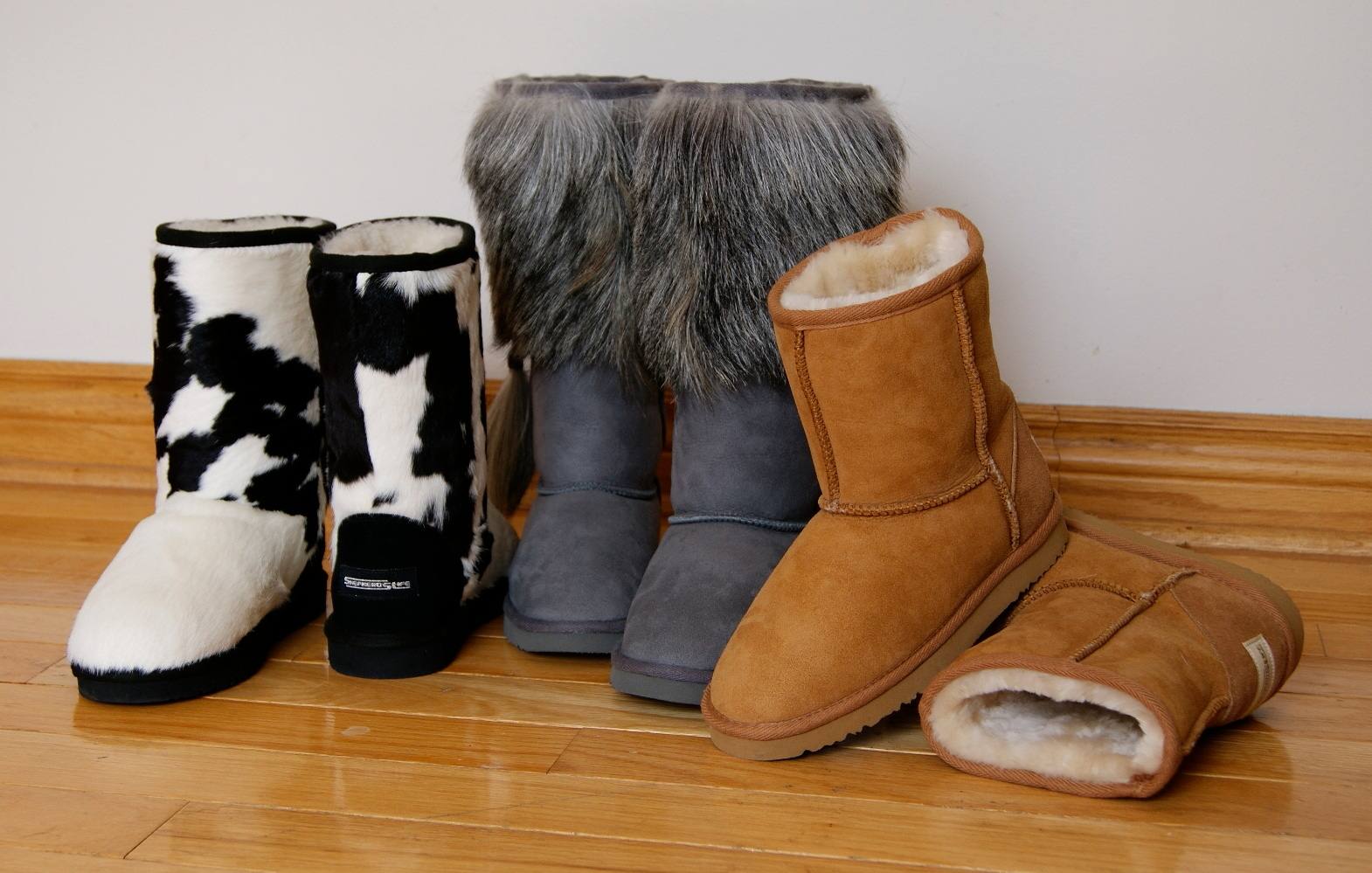
Fashion ugg boots

Traditional Australian ugg boots are made from sheepskins with fleece attached. The fleece is tanned into the leather and the boot is assembled with the fleece on the inside. Some ugg boots have a synthetic sole, commonly made from ethylene-vinyl acetate (EVA). The stitching is often prominent on the outside of the boot. The natural insulative properties of sheepskin gives isothermal properties to the boots: the thick fleecy fibres on the inner part of the boots wick moisture and allow air to circulate, keeping the feet at body temperature and allowing the boots to keep feet warm in cold weather and cool in hot weather. Produced by a number of manufacturers, they come in a variety of colours, including black, pink, blue, chestnut, and fuchsia. They are available in both pull-on and lace-up varieties and their height can range from just above the ankle to above the knee.

Some variations of ugg style boots have also been made from kangaroo fur and leather. There are also synthetic boots. Although derided as "fake" by some in the industry, their lower price made them appealing to large retail chains such as Myer.

=== Animal rights ===
Sheep-skin is a by-product of processing sheep for human consumption. That is, sheep are not specifically killed for their skins. Because it is a by-product, the supply of sheep-skin is limited by the number of sheep processed for the meat industry. The rise in the popularity of "UGG"-branded ugg boots has been the "driving force" in recent shortages, which have seen sheep-skin prices from 2010 to 2012 increase by up to 80%.

As one of many clothing products made from animal skin, sheepskin boots have been the subject of criticism by the animal rights movement, and producers have responded by improving animal welfare. Animal rights groups call for the boycott of sheepskin boots and their replacement with synthetic alternatives. In 2007, Pamela Anderson, realizing that the boots were made of skin, called for a boycott on her website. In February 2008, the Princeton Animal Welfare Society staged a campus protest against the fur industry, particularly attacking the sheepskin boot industry.

In 2024, UGG announced their first vegan boots in a collaboration with designer Collina Strada. The footwear materials are made using sugarcane, Tencel and recycled polyester microfiber.

== Trademark disputes ==
The trademarking of the UGG name has been the subject of dispute in several countries. Deckers Outdoor Corporation has won disputes in the United States, the Netherlands, and Turkey. In Australia and New Zealand, ugg is a generic term. The trademark for "Ugh-Boots" has been removed from the trademark registry for non-use. Outside Australia and New Zealand, UGG (written in capital letters) is a registered trademark of Deckers Outdoor Corporation.

The first trademark application for UGG in the United States was filed by Brian Smith's company in 1984. In the 1990s, Smith and then Deckers secured additional registrations in the U.S. and other countries. In 1999, Deckers began asserting its new trademark and sent out cease and desist letters to Australian manufacturers that were selling sheepskin boots outside of Australia via the internet. By the early 2000s, demand for UGG boots was soaring with Australian and U.S.-based manufacturers selling sheepskin boots over the Internet. There was confusion among consumers between generic ugg boots made in Australia and Deckers' UGG brand boots. Deckers' law firm Middletons of Melbourne began a serious effort to halt the Australian companies' sales by sending cease and desist letters to a number of Australian and U.S.-based manufacturers, preventing them from selling sheepskin boots using the UGG trademark on eBay or from using the word in their registered business names or domain names. Deckers initiated numerous domain name actions under the UDRP.

In response to these actions by Deckers, some Australian manufacturers formed the Australian Sheepskin Association to fight the corporation's claim, arguing that "ugg" is a generic term referring to flat-heeled, pull-on sheepskin boots. One of these manufacturers, Perth's Uggs-N-Rugs, who had been manufacturing ugg boots since 1978 and selling them online since 1996, appealed to Australian trademark regulators. The officer who heard the case stated that the "evidence overwhelmingly supports the proposition that the terms (ugg, ugh and ug boots) are interchangeably used to describe a specific style of sheepskin boot and are the first and most natural way in which to describe these goods." In 2006 Uggs-N-Rugs won the right to use the term UGG BOOT/S and variations such as UGH BOOT/S within Australia. Deckers retained the trademark rights to their UGG logo in Australia as trademark protection only applies to the way the mark appears in its entirety and not the words it contains. IP Australia also ruled that the trademark "UGH-boots" (with hyphen) should be removed from the trademark register for non-use as Deckers had only been using the UGG logo, not the UGH marks. This 2006 ruling applies only in Australia and Deckers still owns the trademarks in other jurisdictions such as the US, China, Japan and the European Union.

== See also ==
- List of boots
- List of shoe styles
- 2000s in fashion
- 2010s in fashion
- Mukluk
