= Simple Shoes =

American footwear brand

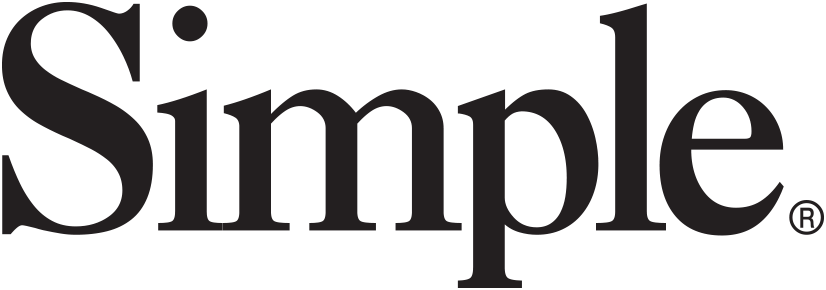
- Company type: Private
- Industry: Footwear
- Founded: 1991; 34 years ago in California
- Founder: Eric Meyer
- Headquarters: Atlantic Highlands, United States
- Areas served: United States, Canada, Australia, New Zealand, Japan, Europe
- Key people: Denis Ryan, Ash Scott, Phoebe Ryan, Seamus Ryan, Marcia Currie, Kathy Berger, Caroline Robles
- Owner: Denis Ryan & Ash Scott
- Website: simpleshoes.com

Simple Shoes, also known as Simple, is an American footwear brand created in 1991 by Eric Meyer, a California native. Simple was acquired by Deckers Outdoor Corporation in 1993, then closed by Deckers in 2011, and subsequently acquired by Denis Ryan in 2015. Sold to the Hurley family in 2020.

== History ==
To obtain start up capital, Eric sold his vintage Volkswagen collection. Simple Shoes was a pioneer in sustainable manufacturing and is known for being one of the first to use green sustainable materials, such as bamboo, jute, hemp, recycled PET, used tires and cork.
