= EMU Australia =

Australian company

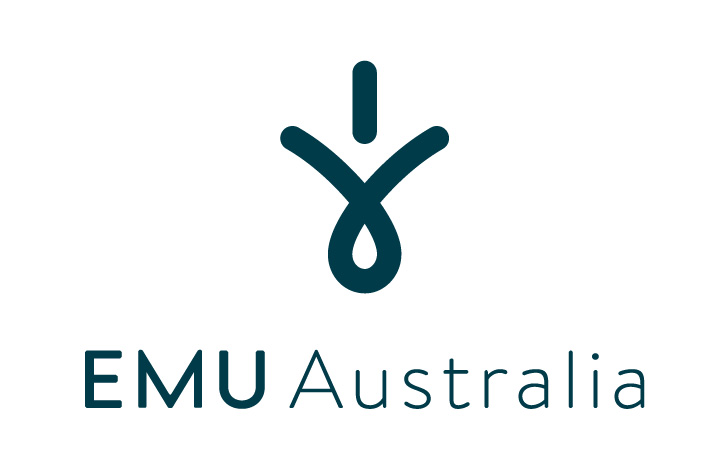
- EMU 2015 Logo
- Founded: 1948
- Founder: Gordon Jackson
- Headquarters: South Geelong, Victoria, Australia
- Area served: Worldwide
- Products: Footwear, apparel and accessories
- Website: emuaustralia.com

EMU Australia (simply referred to as EMU; pronounced eem-you, often mispronounced eem-moo) is an Australian lifestyle brand that designs, produces and markets footwear and accessories. The brand is best known for their sheepskin and Merino wool products. Their signature products are sheepskin boots, which have been a popular fashion trend for young women since the 2000s. EMU products are also available for men and children.

Emu Australia was originally established as Jackson's Tannery by Gordon Jackson in 1948. Jackson's Tannery supplied ugg boots to several retailers including a Western Australian company, Country Leather, who supplied their products to Ugg Holdings in the United States. In 1994, Country Leather opened its own shop in Redondo Beach, California and Ugg Holdings began sourcing ugg boots directly from Jackson's, who had changed their name to EMU Australia when surf veteran Andrew Raggett took over ownership of the company. Following the sale of Ugg Holdings to Deckers Outdoor Corporation, who outsourced the manufacture of ugg boots to China in 1995, EMU continued production and sales under their own Emu brand. The main headquarters for the company is located in South Geelong, Victoria, Australia. International locations include Grand Rapids, Michigan, United States; Hamburg, Germany; and London, England.

EMU Australia's main competitor for ugg boots in the Australian market is Luda Productions, which holds approximately 75% market share in Australia. The main competing brands in EMU's overseas markets are UGG Australia, manufactured by Deckers Outdoor Corporation, and Bearpaw, which produce similar sheepskin products and hold over 95% market share worldwide between them.

The name "EMU" is derived from the Australian Coat of Arms which features the emu bird.
