= Doctrine of foreign equivalents =

Rule in trademark law

This article discusses the trademark doctrine regarding translation of foreign words. For the patent doctrine regarding equivalent means to practice an invention, see Doctrine of equivalents.

Official seal of the USPTO

The doctrine of foreign equivalents is a rule applied in United States trademark law which requires courts and the TTAB to translate foreign words in determining whether they are registrable as trademarks, or confusingly similar with existing marks. The doctrine is intended to protect consumers within the United States from confusion or deception caused by the use of terms in different languages. In some cases, a party will use a word as a mark which is either generic or merely descriptive of the goods in a foreign language, or which shares the same meaning as an existing mark to speakers of that foreign language.

== Test applied ==
The Trademark Manual of Examining Procedure ("TMEP") states the test for applying the doctrine of foreign equivalents is "whether, to those American buyers familiar with the foreign language, the word would denote its English equivalent". With respect to descriptive or generic marks, the TMEP specifies that in determining whether a foreign term is entitled to registration, "[t]he test is whether, to those American buyers familiar with the foreign language, the word would have a descriptive or generic connotation". However, "foreign words from dead or obscure languages may be so unfamiliar to the American buying public that they should not be translated into English for descriptiveness purposes." This test is also applied by courts to determine "whether that foreign word would be descriptive of the product to that segment of the purchasing public which is familiar with that language."

It is unclear whether the test differs for asserted cases of likelihood of confusion. The Federal Circuit has recently clarified the applicability of the doctrine of foreign equivalents in likelihood of confusion cases, stating that "When it is unlikely that an American buyer will translate the foreign mark and will take it as it is, then the doctrine of foreign equivalents will not be applied". The court noted that "the doctrine of foreign equivalents is not an absolute rule and should be viewed merely as a guideline". Instead "[t]he doctrine should be applied only when it is likely that the ordinary American purchaser would "stop and translate [the word] into its English equivalent". The Federal Circuit specifically found that "it is improbable that the average American purchaser would stop and translate 'VEUVE' into 'widow'".

The Palm Bay Imports case suggests that it is the same test stating "[u]nder the doctrine of foreign equivalents, foreign words from common languages are translated into English to determine genericness, descriptiveness, as well as similarity of connotation in order to ascertain confusing similarity with English word marks."

=== The Ordinary American Purchaser ===
As noted above, in Palm Bay, the Federal Circuit held that the doctrine of foreign equivalents only applies when the "ordinary American purchaser" is likely to translate the foreign mark into English. A short time after Palm Bay was decided, the T.T.A.B. interpreted "ordinary American purchaser" in In re Thomas and held that the ordinary American purchaser includes only purchasers "familiar with the foreign language." This narrow definition of "ordinary American purchaser" effectively guaranteed that the doctrine would be applied in nearly every case involving a foreign word since "those proficient in a non-English language . . . would ordinarily be expected to translate words into English."

At its next opportunity, however, the Federal Circuit abrogated Thomas in part. In In re Spirits International, a geographic deceptiveness case, the Federal Circuit held that the ordinary American purchaser "includes all American purchasers, including those proficient in a non-English language."

However, because the Spirits court limited its ruling to the doctrine's application with respect to the geographic deceptiveness bar, the Board currently applies the Spirits definition of ordinary American purchaser in cases of geographic deceptiveness refusals and the Thomas definition to all other bars.

== Status of words in foreign countries ==
Cases have noted that the status accorded to words in foreign countries has no bearing on the registration of marks in the U.S. For example, in Anheuser-Busch, Inc. v. Stroh Brewery Co., the court rejected as irrelevant the generic usage of the phrase "L.A. beer" in Australia for low alcohol beer. In Seiko Sporting Goods USA, Inc. v. Kabushiki Kaisha Hattori Tokeiten, the court stated that "[w]hile plaintiff has sought to show that Seiko is a generic term in Japanese, it is not so recognized in this country. Accordingly, the mark must still be regarded as arbitrary and fanciful in the United States."

Furthermore, "[a] number of cases hold that a term may be generic in one country and suggestive in another". In Carcione v. The Greengrocer, Inc., a court rejected as irrelevant the generic use of the term "Greengrocer" in Britain for a retailer of fruit. The defendant argued that the trademark "Greengrocer", which is a generic term in Britain for a retailer of fruits and vegetables, was not entitled to protection as a trademark in the United States. The court rejected this argument on the ground that it is irrelevant how a term is used outside the United States: "The parties agree that the term is generic in Britain. Since we deal here with American trademark law, and thus American consumers, neither British usage nor the dictionary definition indicating such usage are determinative."

== Dead and obscure languages ==
TMEP § 1209.03(g) expresses the caveat that "foreign words from dead or obscure languages may be so unfamiliar to the American buying public that they should not be translated into English for descriptiveness purposes." Emphasis added. "Descriptiveness is evaluated according to 'that segment of the purchasing public which is familiar with that language.'" General Cigar Co. v. G.D.M. Inc., 988 F. Supp. 647, 660 (S.D.N.Y. 1997) (quoting 1 McCarthy § 11.14, p. 464-65). In that case, the court found that the strength of the Cohiba mark was not diminished by the fact that Cohiba is the Taino Indian word for tobacco, because the Taino language was an obscure language. The court noted:

A word which is not in general or common use, and is unintelligible and non-descriptive to the general public, although it may be known to linguists and scientist, may be properly regarded as arbitrary and fanciful and capable of being used as a trademark or trade-name.

Nevertheless, cases exist where trademark registration has been rejected for a word that was generic or descriptive when translated from a language such as Latin or Ancient Greek.

== Transliterations versus translations ==
Where a word is a foreign transliteration of an English mark, the TTAB has held that there is nothing to translate, and the doctrine of foreign equivalents is not invoked. In Green Spot (Thailand) Ltd. v. Vitasoy Int'l Holdings Ltd., the TTAB considered the application of the doctrine where Green Spot sought to register "Vitamilk", and was opposed by Vitasoy, which was the owner of a senior registration. Green Spot also owned a mark in Chinese characters for which the first sets of characters were transliterations of "vi" and "ta" with no meaning in Chinese, while the third, 奶 (nai) was the Chinese word for "milk". Green Spot argued that its senior Chinese character mark was the equivalent of Vitamilk, and that Green Spot's ownership of the senior mark gave it the right to own the equivalent English mark. The TTAB refused to apply the doctrine of foreign equivalents, because the transliterations of "vi" and "ta" had no actual translation from Chinese to English.

== Criticism ==
The doctrine has been criticized in recent years. Commentators have noted that courts have "reached irreconcilable holdings" in applying the doctrine. It has also been suggested that the doctrine be abolished.
