= QAD Redzone =

Manufacturing software company

QAD | Redzone
- Type: Private
- Industry: Computer software
- Founded: Carpinteria, California (1979)
- Headquarters: Miami, Florida
- Key people: Pamela Lopker (founder), Sanjay Brahmawar (CEO)
- Products: QAD Adaptive ERP, Redzone Connected Workforce, ChampionAI agentic-AI layer
- Owner: Thoma Bravo
- Number of employees: 1,400+ (2026)
- Website: www.qad.com

QAD | Redzone (formerly QAD Inc.) is a global enterprise software company that develops cloud-based applications for manufacturers. Pamela Lopker founded the company in 1979, and it is headquartered in Miami, Florida. The private-equity firm Thoma Bravo acquired QAD | Redzone in 2021. Sanjay Brahmawar, became Chief Executive Officer in 2025.

The company’s product portfolio is organized around three areas. QAD Adaptive ERP is its cloud-based enterprise resource planning suite for manufacturers. Redzone Connected Workforce equips frontline production teams with real-time collaboration, productivity, and quality tools. ChampionAI, launched in 2024-2025 through collaboration with Amazon Web Services, is QAD’s agentic artificial intelligence platform that integrates with both QAD Adaptive ERP and Redzone Connected Workforce.

QAD’s combined platform helps manufacturers move from a “system of record” to a “system of action,” embedding agentic AI directly into core enterprise and frontline processes.

== History ==
=== Origins and founding (1979) ===
QAD’s origins were the leather-goods and footwear business of Co-founder Karl Lopker. While studying at the University of California, Santa Barbara (UCSB), Lopker co-founded the sandal maker Deckers in 1975. In 1979, unable to find software to help run the sandal business, Lopker and Pamela Meyer, his classmate and future wife, founded QAD to develop manufacturing software of their own. Karl Lopker left Deckers in 1982 to join QAD as chief executive officer. Karl and Pamela had married by then and ran the company together, establishing the manufacturing focus of QAD, and growing it until it made software for manufacturers worldwide.

=== Public company and recognition (1997) ===
QAD completed its initial public offering (IPO) in August 1997, listing on Nasdaq under the ticker symbol QADI. Pamela Lopker became a well-known woman in enterprise technology. She was a member of the Forbes 400, was Ernst & Young Entrepreneur of the Year, was inducted into the Women in Technology Hall of Fame in 1997, and recognized for her contributions to U.S. manufacturing by Forbes magazine as a “Hero of U.S. Manufacturing.”

=== Private ownership and the QAD | Redzone era (2021–present) ===
In 2018, Anton Chilton was named CEO. Chilton had been with the company since 2004.

In November 2021, the private-equity firm Thoma Bravo completed its acquisition of QAD in a transaction valued at approximately $2 billion, taking the company private.

Following the acquisition, QAD expanded its capabilities beyond traditional core enterprise resource planning (ERP), focusing on converting its offering from a “system of record” to a “system of action” as the software initiates tasks rather than only recording them. The strategy was supported by a series of acquisitions in process intelligence, workforce management, and artificial intelligence. These included Allocation Network GmbH, Foreign Trade Zone Corporation, and WebJaguar.

In 2022, after transitioning to a "virtual-first model," QAD sold its former headquarters to the University of California for $100 million and is now headquartered in Miami, Florida. Also in 2022, the company acquired LiveJourney, a French developer of process-mining and process-intelligence software.

In 2023, QAD acquired Redzone, a connected-workforce platform for manufacturers, and formally rebranded its operations as QAD | Redzone. In 2025, it acquired Kavida.ai, a developer of agentic AI for industrial procurement. These acquisitions allowed QAD | Redzone to develop and introduce AI-driven automation across manufacturing operations. In March 2025, Sanjay Brahmawar was named CEO, succeeding Anton Chilton.

QAD | Redzone brought its agentic AI capabilities to market across its solutions under the name ChampionAI. It strengthened its offering through technology partnerships, including with Amazon Web Services (AWS) and Boomi.

== Products ==
QAD | Redzone develops manufacturing software organized around three product lines: the QAD Adaptive ERP enterprise resource planning system, the Redzone connected workforce platform, and ChampionAI, an artificial-intelligence layer that spans both. The three products help move manufacturers from “systems of record” to “systems of action. In 2026, the company added Manufacturing Intelligence, an intelligence layer that works across manufacturing systems to provide next steps, to their product line to connect the systems. It also works across other environments without replacing existing systems. It also added Champion Assist that adds intelligence directly into ERP systems.

=== QAD Adaptive ERP ===
QAD Adaptive ERP is a cloud-based enterprise resource planning system for manufacturers in sectors including automotive, life sciences, consumer products, food and beverage, and high-tech and industrial equipment. Its core capabilities include streamlining financials, customer management, supply chain, manufacturing, embedded analytics, and global multi-site operations. The product is offered through public-cloud, private-cloud, and on-premise deployment options.

In 2025, QAD | Redzone released the newest version of QAD Adaptive, to include an integration with ChampionAI. QAD has been named in the “Major Players” category by research firm IDC for reasons including QAD Adaptive which supports 14 languages and 46 localizations and is deployed in more than 100 countries. It is planned for migration to a public-cloud architecture on Amazon Web Services using Kubernetes and containerization. The management team, including Chief Executive Officer Sanjay Brahmawar, and an ERP implementation agent are among the company’s strengths.

=== Redzone (Connected Workforce) ===
Redzone is a connected-workforce platform for frontline manufacturing teams, combining real-time production dashboards, digital quality and compliance workflows, maintenance and reliability tools, and a learning-management module. Redzone was founded in 2013, based in Miami, Florida, and QAD acquired the company in February 2023. Reuters reported the deal was valued at approximately US$1 billion, though the companies did not formally disclose terms.

Redzone, as a connected-worker application vendor, offers digitized work instructions and collaboration tools for a mid-market ERP vendor competing against larger rivals such as SAP and Oracle.

The Redzone platform is used by more than 1,000 plants and by 300,000 frontline workers with companies including Nestlé, Tyson Foods, and Post Holdings. The company’s 2025 productivity benchmark report indicated an average productivity gain of 26% within 90 days across 1,500 factories.

=== ChampionAI ===
ChampionAI is an agentic-AI layer, introduced in 2024 and 2025 as a network of role-based software agents to automate ERP and operational tasks for procurement, sourcing, and production. It is used with manufacturing execution, supply chain management, human capital management, and customer relationship management systems, as well as IoT platforms and business intelligence tools. ChampionAI uses frontline activity and operational best practices to detect anomalies in systems and then delivers suggested corrective actions. The layer is built on third-party infrastructure including Amazon Web Services and Boomi. In late 2025, ChampionAI was available for other QAD products and released within the ERP system. With ChampionAI, QAD uses AWS Bedrock models, guardrails and agent tooling.

== Acquisitions ==
=== 2006-2022: Acquisitions as QAD Inc. ===
In June 2006, QAD acquired Bisgen Ltd. whose customer relationship management (CRM) product was tailored to the sales and marketing automation needs of manufacturers. In September, the company acquired transportation management software provider Precision Software. Later that year, QAD acquired FBO Systems Inc., a provider of enterprise asset management (EAM) software.

In April 2008, the company acquired the assets of FullTilt Solutions, a developer of product information management (PIM) software.

QAD acquired two companies in 2012. In June, the company purhcased DynaSys, a European provider of collaborative demand and supply chain planning software, for a reported €6.0 million. In December, QAD acquired CEBOS, a provider of quality management and management system standard software and services.

In August 2018, QAD acquired PT Iris Sistem Inforindo (PT Iris), a distributor and system integrator for QAD software operating across South Asia, primarily in Indonesia.

In January 2021, QAD acquired Allocation Network GmbH, a provider of strategic sourcing and supplier management based in Munich, Germany. In April of that year, QAD acquired Foreign Trade Zone Corporation, a provider of cloud-based Foreign-Trade Zone (FTZ) software and consulting services based in Mobile, Alabama. In December, QAD acquired a digital commerce company, California-based WebJaguar.

In 2022, QAD acquired LiveJourney (Your Data Consulting SAS), a French developer of process-intelligence and process-mining software whose capabilities later contributed to the company’s artificial intelligence strategy.

=== 2023: QAD Inc. acquisition of Redzone ===
In February 2023, QAD acquired Redzone, a connected workforce solution provider based in Miami, FL., for $1 Billion. It was QAD's largest acquisition to date.

=== 2024-2025: Acquisitions as QAD | Redzone ===
In October 2024, QAD | Redzone purchased Phenix Software Inc., a Toronto-based production scheduling platform company.

In November 2025, QAD | Redzone acquired Kavida.ai (Kavida Technologies Ltd), a British developer of agentic artificial intelligence software for industrial procurement.

== Partnerships ==
In 2025, QAD | Redzone entered into a technology partnership with the integration platform provider Boomi. In 2026, QAD | Redzone announced a collaboration with Amazon Web Services (AWS) and Tata Consultancy Services (TCS) to deliver agentic artificial intelligence capabilities for mid-market manufacturers.

== See also ==
- Progress Software
