= Locker (surname) =

Locker is the surname of:

- Berl Locker (1887–1972), Zionist activist and Israeli politician
- Bob Locker (1938–2022), retired Major League Baseball pitcher
- Dale Locker (1929–2011), Democratic member of the Ohio House of Representatives
- Edward Hawke Locker (1777–1849), English watercolourist and administrator of the Royal Naval Hospital, Greenwich
- Harel Locker (born 1965), Israeli lawyer and civil servant
- Jake Locker (born 1988), National Football League quarterback
- William Locker (1866–1952), English footballer and cricketer
- William Locker (Royal Navy officer) (1731–1800), Royal Navy commodore
- Yohanan Locker (born 1956), Israeli general
