= UGG (brand) =

Australian fashion company

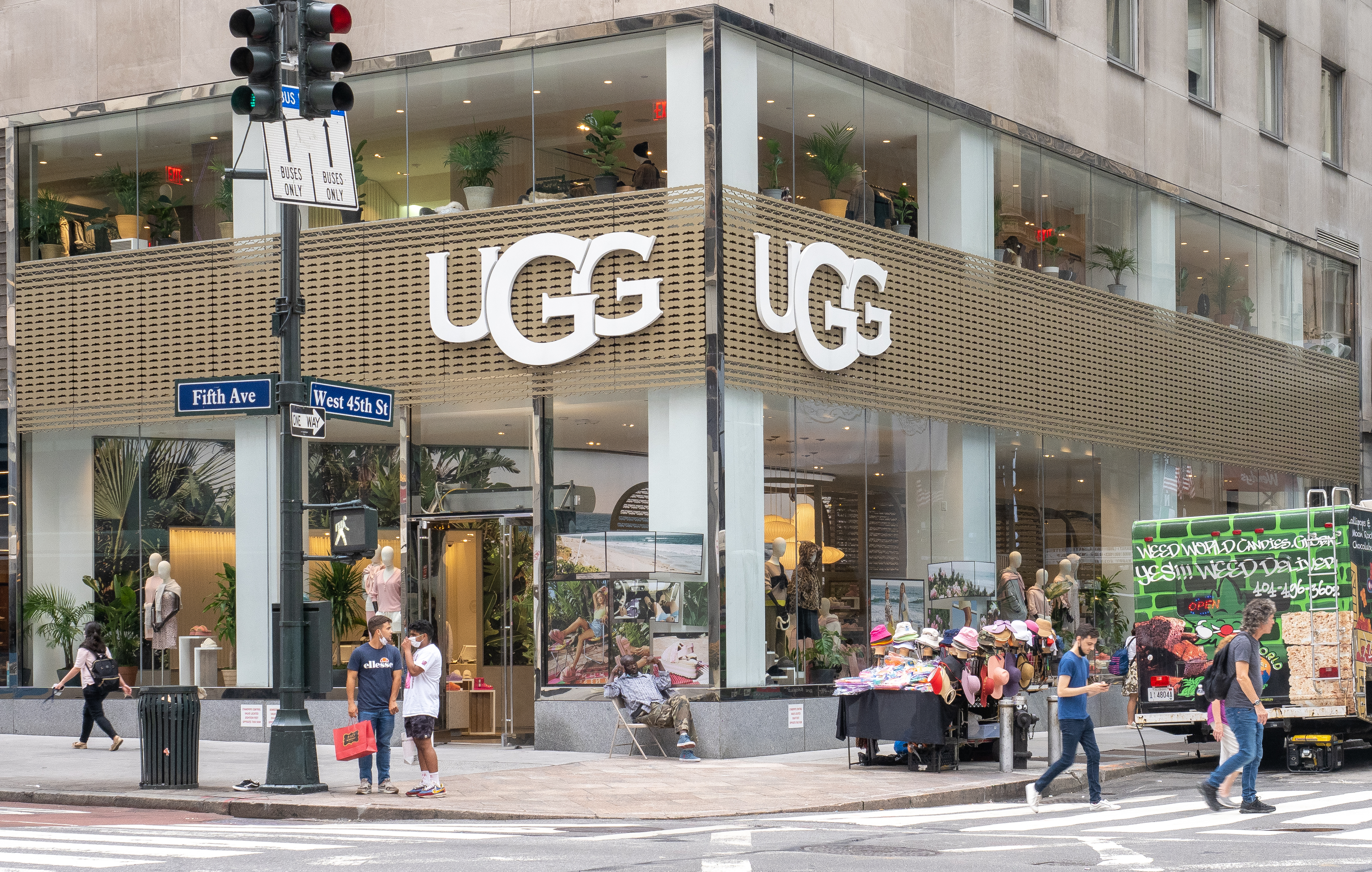
- Flagship store on Fifth Avenue
- Type: Subsidiary
- Industry: Fashion
- Founded: 1978; 48 years ago in Santa Monica, California
- Founder: Brian Smith
- Headquarters: 250 Coromar Drive; Goleta, California 93117; United States; 34.4296°N 119.86202°W
- Number of locations: 130+ stores
- Area served: Worldwide
- Products: Footwear; Apparel; Accessories; Home textiles
- Revenue: ▲US$2.24 billion (2024)
- Parent: Deckers Brands
- Website: ugg.com

UGG is an American fashion company primarily known for its sheepskin boots, founded in 1978 by Brian Smith in California. UGG also sells apparel, accessories, and home textiles.

== History ==
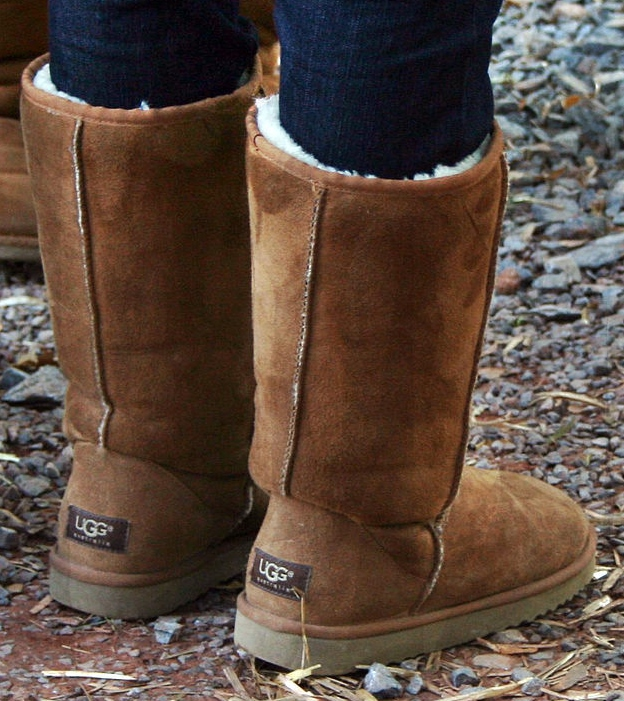
A pair of UGG boots

UGG was founded in California in 1978 by Australian surfer Brian Smith and Doug Jensen. Smith was living in Santa Monica, California, after studying at UCLA's Anderson School of Management. Smith and Jensen first applied to be the United States distributors for the Western Australian sheepskin boot manufacturer Country Leather. Unhappy with the brand, Smith trademarked UGG. Later, family friends invested $20,000 in the venture and the group set up UGG Imports. In their first season in business, UGG Imports sold 28 pairs of boots. Due to other business commitments, in 1979 Jensen handed over his share of the company to Smith. Sales steadily grew and Smith set up UGG Holdings Inc. and in 1985 registered a US trademark on a rams head logo with the words "Original UGG Boot UGG Australia". By 1994, 80 percent of UGG's sales were in southern Orange County, but the company gained international attention after the boots were worn by the U.S. Olympic team in Lillehammer for the 1994 Winter Olympics.

In 1995, Deckers Brands acquired Smith's business for $14.6 million and continued to expand it. During the late 1990s, UGG began experiencing double-digit sales growth as Deckers developed the company into an international brand. In 2003, UGG boots were included on Oprah Winfrey's show as part of "Oprah's Favorite Things". Afterwards, the brand received an unprecedented surge in sales. In 2006, UGG opened its first brick and mortar store in New York's SoHo neighborhood. The company opened its first international store in Japan later that same year.

UGG partnered with designer shoe brand Jimmy Choo in 2009 to launch a capsule collection combining the brands' styles. The following year, UGG debuted a collection of boots designed in collaboration with Swarovski. The company launched its first men's advertising campaign in 2011 featuring New England Patriots quarterback Tom Brady in 2011. The first UGG for Men stand-alone store opened in New York in 2012. UGG reported over $1 billion (U.S) in sales for 2012. UGG products are manufactured in a number of countries, primarily China. Deckers uses two Chinese tanneries to supply the sheepskin. The tanneries in turn source the raw skins from Australia and the United Kingdom.

Its collection of home goods launched in 2013 and included products such as rugs, blankets, pillows and other home pieces. In June 2015, UGG has announced a collaboration with Pixar. The company launched a capsule collection reflecting Pixar's film Inside Out, and have produced Disney-themed boots featuring Mickey Mouse, Minnie Mouse and Tinker Bell.

In 2016, Deckers rebranded to "UGG", instead of "UGG Australia", in response to an investigation by the Australian Competition & Consumer Commission because of a complaint that the reference to "Australia", in its branding of sheepskin boots manufactured in China and Vietnam, was misleading and deceptive, and therefore in breach of Australia's consumer protection and fair competition laws. Deckers now refers to the UGG brand as "Californian" rather than "Australian".

In 2020, UGG debuted seasonal ready-to-wear apparel. UGG hired a new senior design team to lead its ready-to-wear collection. The collections are mostly athleisure, with a focus on faux fur, fleece and sherpa. The collection features men's, women's, and unisex designs.

In March 2025, an UGG ad featuring NewJeans member Hanni drew criticism in China for featuring sexually suggestive imagery and objectifying women.

== In popular culture ==
UGG-branded sheepskin boots have been a style staple since they first appeared on Oprah Winfrey's show in her second edition of "Oprah's Favorite Things" on November 24, 2003, in which she purchased over 350 shoes for her staff and audience. The boots gained a large celebrity following and were frequently seen on notable people such as Kate Upton, Blake Lively, Kate Hudson, Cameron Diaz, Jennifer Lopez, Leonardo DiCaprio, the Rolling Stones guitarist Ronnie Wood, and Sarah Jessica Parker as Carrie Bradshaw on Sex and the City. This exposure led to immense growth in the UGG's popularity and recognizability.

In 2013, various Vogue editors wrote about wearing and owning UGG-branded sheepskin boots and fashion figures Alexa Chung and André Leon Talley gave testimonials about their UGG-branded sheepskin boots.

== Trademark disputes ==
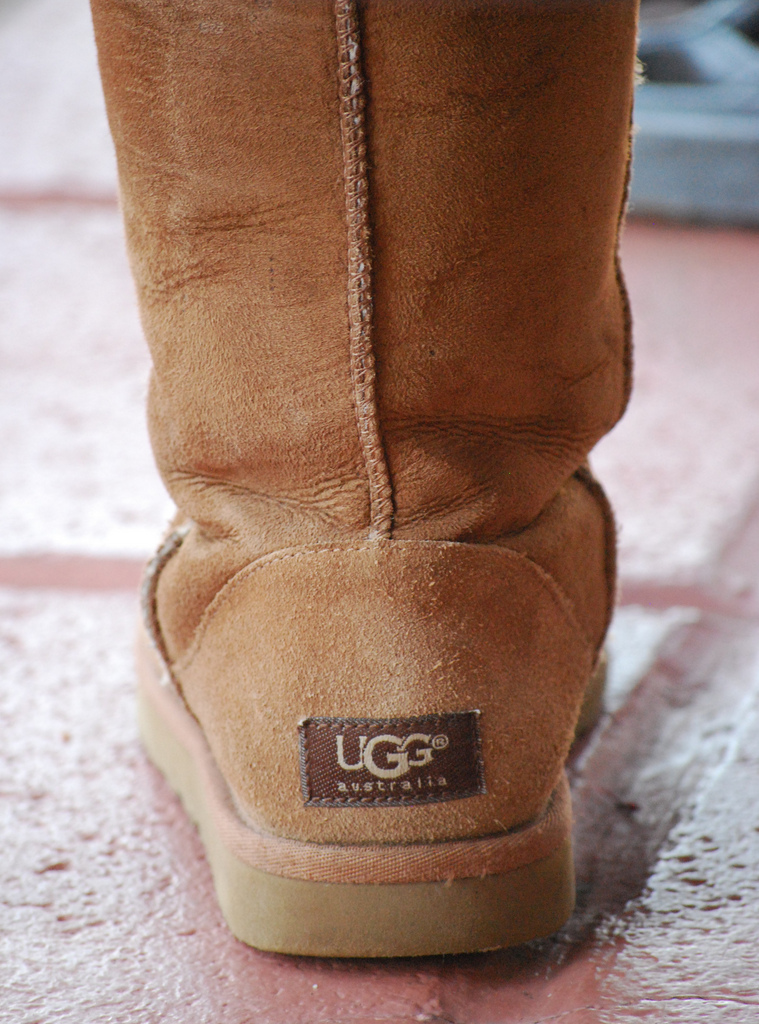
Back of an UGG boot

In 1971, Shane Steadman registered the trademark UGH-BOOT on the Australian Trade Mark Registry, and obtained an Australian registration for UGH in 1982. These registrations remained valid in Australia until they got removed for non-use in 2006. Steadman sold his UGH brand boots widely in Australia throughout the 1970s and 1980s. This registration was subsequently sold to Ugg Holdings Inc. in early 1995. In August 1995, Deckers Brands purchased Ugg Holdings, and in 1999 registered Ugg Holdings trademarks, including the UGG AUSTRALIA label (with sun-like device), in Australia. Attempts by Deckers to stop other traders from using the "UGG" mark in Australia were challenged, ultimately leading to 2006 decisions by IP Australia to remove company's "UGH" and "UGH-BOOTS" trademarks due to non-use, finding that they had not been used during a three-year period ending one month before a removal application was submitted. The Australian trademark that contains "UGG Australia" in stylised text was maintained. But there are many other similar trade marks in Australia that contain the words "UGG Australia" along with other graphical elements. In 2016, the Australian Competition & Consumer Commission investigated Deckers because of a complaint that the reference to "Australia" in its branding was misleading and deceptive, and therefore in breach of Australia's consumer protection and fair competition laws. In response, Deckers rebranded to "UGG", instead of "UGG Australia". Deckers now refers to the UGG brand as "Californian" rather than "Australian".

Deckers continues to hold registrations for the UGG trademark in the United States, China and over 130 other countries. The validity of the UGG trademark outside of Australia has also been challenged, but courts have consistently upheld its validity. In 2004, Deckers filed a case against Koolaburra in the California federal court asserting that their use of "Ug" was trademark infringement. Koolaburra argued that the UGG trademark was invalid as being generic and obtained by fraud. In February 2005, the court ruled for Deckers stating that survey evidence clearly demonstrates that the UGG mark is not generic. There was no evidence that Smith acted with an intent to defraud the Trademark Office, and consumers would likely be confused with the similarity in "appearance, sight and sound" between "Ug" and "UGG" as the parties were marketing in direct competition with identical products. However, the court declined to rule on the validity of Deckers' Australian trademark registrations in the context of the US case.

Other UGG trademark disputes have occurred with companies including Luda Production Pty and Emu Australia, as well as local manufacturers in countries such as Turkey and China.

In August 2016, Australian senator Nick Xenophon called for international protection of the Australian footwear term ugg.

=== Trademark enforcement against other manufacturers ===
Deckers actively enforces its trademark rights in those countries in which it has succeeded in obtaining trade mark rights to "UGG". According to Deckers' brand-protection unit, in 2009 it took down 2,500 "fake" websites, 20,000 eBay listings and 150,000 other online auction listings with 60,000 pairs of "counterfeit" UGG footwear confiscated by customs agents.

Law enforcement officials in the UK, the US and China have reported seizures of counterfeit UGG brand boots. In 2009, US customs agents confiscated 60,000 pairs of boots falsely marked with the "UGG" trade mark, and the company took action against 2500 websites that were selling fraudulent products, as well as some 170,000 listings on eBay, Craigslist and similar sites.

The National Arbitration Forum, which has been appointed by ICANN to resolve most Internet domain name disputes, has used Deckers Brands ownership of the UGG trademark in the United States as part of several decisions to direct Internet domains containing UGG to be transferred to Deckers.

== Animal welfare ==
Since UGG-branded sheepskin boots are one of many clothing products made from animal skin, the production of UGG-branded sheepskin boots has been the subject of criticism by the animal liberation movement. In the decade beginning in 2000, the animal rights organization PETA called for the boycott of UGG-branded boots and their replacement with alternatives not made from animal skin.

In 2007, Pamela Anderson, realizing that UGG-branded boots were made of sheepskin, wrote on her website that she does not support the brand any longer. In February 2008, the Princeton Animal Welfare Society staged a campus protest against the fur industry, particularly attacking the sheepskin industry. "Students lay in the newly fallen snow on the Frist Campus Center's North Front Lawn on Friday afternoon, feigning death, wearing coats covered with fake blood and sporting signs that read, 'What if you were killed for your coat?' "

UGG makes its footwear within its factories located in Vietnam and China. The sheepskin is primarily sourced from two tanneries in China, and the tanneries in turn source the raw skins from Australia and the United Kingdom.

In 2022, Deckers Outdoor Corporation announced that it would phase alpaca wool out of its brands by the fall of 2023.

In 2024, UGG announced their first vegan boots in a collaboration with designer Collina Strada. The footwear materials are made using sugarcane, Tencel and recycled polyester microfiber.

== See also ==
- EMU Australia
- Bearpaw (brand)
