= Don Schlesinger =

Gaming mathematician and author

Donald Schlesinger is a gaming mathematician, author, lecturer, player, and member of the Blackjack Hall of Fame who specializes in the casino game of blackjack. His work in the field has spanned almost five decades. He is the author of the book Blackjack Attack - Playing the Pros' Way, currently in its third edition, which is considered one of the most sophisticated theoretical and practical studies of the game ever written. In 2023 he and Dave Brolley coauthored, The Hi-Lo Card Counting System: A Complete Guide to Index Play.

Schlesinger was born in New York City and graduated from the City College of New York (CCNY) with a B.S. degree in mathematics. In addition, he holds M.A. and M.Phil. degrees in French from the City University of New York. Don began his professional life teaching mathematics and French in the New York City school system. In 1984, he changed professions and, until 1998, was a principal (executive director) at a Wall Street investment bank. Since his retirement from the finance industry, he has devoted even more time to blackjack, in a researching, writing, teaching, and playing capacity.

His contributions to the game include research into optimal betting, risk analysis, optimal back counting, Floating Advantage, camouflage and team play,

He is most well known for:

- Creating the Illustrious 18, an abridged set of the most efficient card counting indices mentioned in most card counting books published in the last 30 years.
- Creating DI (Desirability Index) and SCORE (Standard Comparison of Risk and Expectation), to optimally compare games under various scenarios.
- Publication of the optimal blackjack composition-dependent basic strategy.

Schlesinger has edited, consulted and/or collaborated with many of the leading blackjack analysts, programmers, and authors, including Stanford Wong, Edward O. Thorp, Peter Griffin, Arnold Snyder, Karel Janeček, John Auston, Katarina Walker, and Norm Wattenberger. In addition, he has contributed to many different issues of the aficionado magazine Blackjack Forum.
