= R. Michael Canjar =

American mathematician

- Born: September 9, 1953
- Died: May 7, 2012 (aged 58)
- Education: University of Detroit; University of Michigan
- Spouse: Elaine Bell
- Scientific career
- Fields: Mathematics; Engineering; Computer Science
- Doctoral advisor: Andreas Blass

Robert Michael "Mike" Canjar (September 9, 1953 – May 7, 2012) was a Professor in the Department of Mathematics and Computer Science at University of Detroit Mercy (UDM). He started there in 1995, and served as department Chairman from 1995–2002. He was promoted to Full Professor in 2001. He previously taught at several universities, including the University of Baltimore. He lived in Livonia, part of metropolitan Detroit, Michigan.

== Education ==
Mike Canjar attended the University of Detroit (now University of Detroit Mercy) where he received his Bachelor of Engineering degree in 1973. He earned a Master of Engineering degree in 1974. He received a Ph.D. in Mathematics from the University of Michigan in 1982, specializing in Mathematical Logic.

== Academia ==
Canjar was Professor of the Department of Mathematics and Computer Science of the University of Detroit Mercy, where he also served as departmental Chairman from 1995–2002. He was with UDM since 1995.

He previously taught at a number of universities, including the University of Baltimore where he'd served as Chairman of the Department of Mathematics, Computer Science, and Statistics. He published a number of articles in mathematical journals on Mathematical Logic and Set Theory. He was also interested in Computer Science, particularly in object-oriented programming and Windows programming, developing courses in those areas.

Canjar has served as president of the Professors' Union of the University of Detroit Mercy.

== Gambling theory ==
Using the pen name MathProf, Mike Canjar was a regular contributor to various websites dedicated to the study of casino games and advantage play, most often to Stanford Wong's Blackjack website where he won a record number 16 times the award for Post of The Month.

MathProf was considered one of the most prominent contributors to the study of casino Blackjack and the related subjects of bankroll management, risk of ruin, kurtosis and skewness, cut card effects, large deviations, and others.

== Personal life ==
Robert Michael Canjar was born in Detroit, Michigan, in 1953, the only child of his parents, Lawrence N. Canjar and Lillian Patricia "Pat" McDonald. His father was Dean of Engineering at the University of Detroit. His mother, who had received a master's degree in Clinical Psychology from the University of Detroit, was a practicing clinical psychologist.

Mike Canjar and Elaine Bell, who has a master's degree in Computer Science and serves as Director of Institutional Research at the UDM, were married on August 8, 2010.

In 2011, Canjar, who was raised as a Roman Catholic, became a member of the Disciples of Christ Memorial Christian Church.

During his April 2010 annual physical exam, he was diagnosed with having inoperable prostate cancer at an already advanced stage, with distant metastasis, and began chemotherapy treatment. Mike Canjar died on May 7, 2012.
