= Aces and eights (blackjack) =

Two strategic starting hands in blackjack

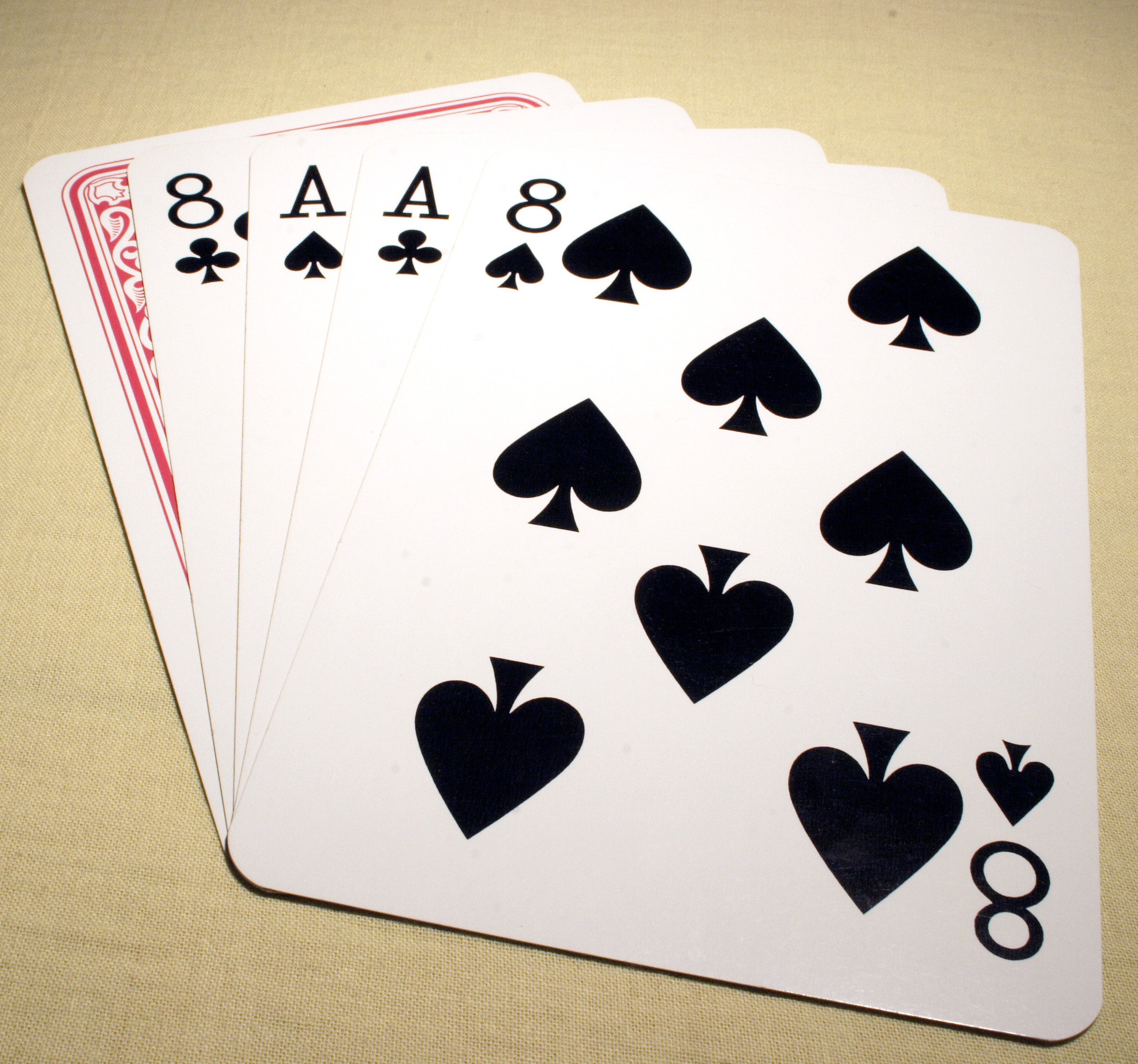
Two aces and two eights in a standard deck of playing cards.

Splitting aces and eights is part of blackjack basic strategy. Rules vary across gambling establishments regarding resplitting, doubling, multiple card draws, and the payout for blackjack, and there are conditional strategic responses that depend upon the number of decks used, the frequency of shuffling and dealer's cards. However, regardless of the various situations, the common strategic wisdom in the blackjack community is to "Always split aces and eights" when dealt either pair as initial cards. This is generally the first rule of any splitting strategy.

== Splitting ==
The objective of blackjack is for a player to defeat the dealer by obtaining a sum as close to 21 as possible without accumulating a total that exceeds this number. In blackjack, the standard rule is that if the player is dealt a pair of identically ranked initial cards, known as a pair, the player is allowed to split them into separate hands and ask for a new second card for each while placing a full initial bet identical to the original wager with each. After placing the wager for the split hands the dealer gives the player an additional card for each split card. The two hands created by splitting are considered independently in competition against the dealer. Splitting allows the gambler to turn a bad hand into one or two hands with a good possibility of winning. It also allows the player to double the bet when the dealer busts. Some rules even allow for resplitting until the player has as many as four hands or allow doubling the bet after a split so that each hand has a bet double the original. The standard rules are that when a bet is doubled on a hand, the player is only allowed to draw one more card for that hand.

=== Aces ===
A pair of aces gives the blackjack player a starting hand value of either a 2 or a soft 12 which is a problematic starting hand in either case. Splitting aces gives a player two chances to hit 21. Splitting aces is so favorable to the player that most gambling establishments have rules limiting the player's rights to do so. In most casinos the player is only allowed to draw one card on each split ace. As a general rule, a ten on a split ace (or vice versa) is not considered a natural blackjack and does not get any bonus. Prohibiting resplitting and redoubling is also common. Regardless of the payout for blackjack, the rules for resplitting, the rules for doubling, the rules for multiple card draws and the dealer's cards, one should always split aces. The only situation where a player should not split aces is a no hole card game when the dealer is showing an ace, because if the dealer is dealt blackjack, then the player would lose both bets if they split instead of just the original bet.

=== Eights ===
If a player is dealt a pair of eights, the total of 16 is considered a troublesome hand. In fact, the value 16 is said to be the worst hand one can have in blackjack. Since sixteen of the other fifty cards have a value of 10 and four have a value of 11, there is a strong chance of getting at least an 18 with either or both split cards. A hand totaling 18 or 19 is much stronger than having a 16. Splitting eights limits one's losses and improves one's hand. Probabilistic research of expected value scenarios shows that by splitting eights one can convert a hand that presents an expected loss to two hands that may present an expected profit or a reduced loss, depending on what the dealer is showing. A split pair of eights is expected to win against dealer upcards of 2 through 7 and to lose less against dealer upcards of 8 through ace. If a player hits on a pair of eights against a dealer upcard of 9, 10, or ace, he is expected to lose $52 for a $100 bet. If the player splits the eights, he is expected to lose only $43 for a $100 bet. The only situation where a player should not split eights is a no hole card game when the dealer is showing a 10 or ace, or against a dealer ace if the dealer hits on soft 17 and surrender is offered.

== History ==
Blackjack's "Four Horsemen" (Roger Baldwin, Wilbert Cantey, Herbert Maisel and James McDermott), using adding machines, determined that splitting eights was less costly than playing the pair of eights as a 16. They were part of a 1950s group that discovered that strategy could reduce the house edge to almost zero in blackjack. Now a typical strategy involves the following sequence of playing decisions: one decides whether to surrender, whether to split, whether to double down, and whether to hit or stand.

One of the earliest proponents of the strategy of splitting eights is Ed Thorp, who developed the strategy on an IBM 704 as part of an overall blackjack strategic theory published in Beat the Dealer: A Winning Strategy for the Game of Twenty-One in 1962. Thorp was the originator of the card counting system for blackjack.
