= Power blackjack =

Power blackjack is a variant of the card gambling game blackjack, modified by certain doubling and splitting rules, called "Power Double" and "Power Split," that are advantageous to the player, offset by the rule that, when the dealer makes a total of twenty two, any active player hands push rather than winning.

== Basic rules ==
The rules for the power blackjack game are based on the standard blackjack rules and involve common blackjack terms.

== Rules variations ==
The main variations are:

- 6 decks in shoe
- Dealer stands on soft 17
- Power double – (see explanation below)
- Power split – (see explanation below)
- Player's blackjack gets paid 3:2.
- Double down after a Split is allowed
- Dealer twenty two pushes against any active player hands (depends on casino rules)
- Surrender when dealer has an open Ace is not allowed (depends on casino rules)
- Insurance when dealer has an open Ace is not allowed (depends on casino rules)

=== Power double ===
If the player's two-card total is nine, ten or eleven (in some casinos, only ten and eleven, and in some casinos soft 19 and 20 are included) and the player doubles, the player has the option of discarding the double-down card received and replacing it with top (unseen) card from the shoe. The player can not replace the second double card. This option increases the favorability of doubling opportunities. Thus, basic strategy for Power Blackjack includes more doubles than for regular blackjack. Furthermore, a player needs to learn the additional strategy of when to replace the first double-down card to take maximum advantage of this rule variation. This strategy will depend on the player's initial total, the card drawn, and the dealer's up card.

=== Power split ===
If the player is initially dealt a fifteen or sixteen (in some casinos hard only), the player can split the two cards, even if they are different values. After a power-split, all regular double-down and split actions are allowed, but power-split and power-double options are no longer allowed.
