= Blackjack Hall of Fame =

Wall of blackjack experts in California, US

Coordinates: 32°56′12″N 116°52′35″W

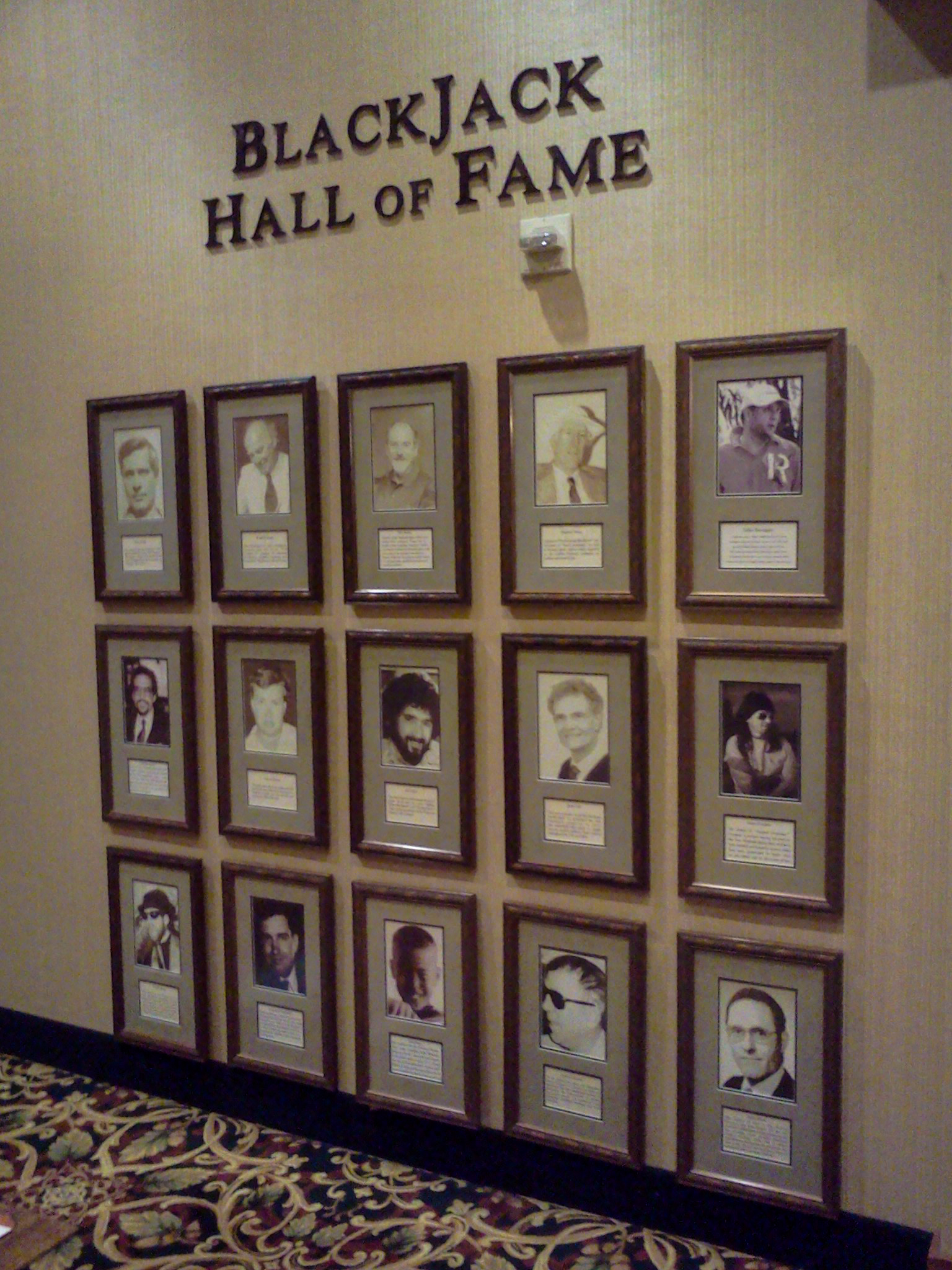
The Blackjack Hall of Fame at the Barona Casino

The Blackjack Hall of Fame honors the greatest blackjack experts, authors, and professional players in history. It was launched in 2002, and its physical premises are in San Diego County, California.

== History ==
The Blackjack Hall of Fame is housed at Barona Resort & Casino in San Diego County, California. The Barona Casino awards to each inductee a permanent lifetime comp for full room, food, and beverage, in exchange for each member’s agreement never to play on Barona’s tables.

In winter 2002, a diverse selection of 21 blackjack experts, authors, and professional players were nominated for membership in the Blackjack Hall of Fame. The public was allowed to vote for about a month through the Internet. The final voting was completed at the January 2003 Blackjack Ball, an event open only to selected professional blackjack players and experts and hosted by blackjack author Max Rubin, at which the first seven members were inducted.

The following year, at the 2004 Blackjack Ball, two more inductees were added, again with primary voting done by professional gamblers at the Ball. Nomination of candidates, after 2006, has become the permanent responsibility of the members of the Blackjack Hall of Fame themselves, while the vote on the candidates that have been nominated is conducted by the invitees to the Blackjack Ball. The Hall of Famers inducted two more members per year through 2006. Since then, they only nominate one person per year.

However, in late 2007, 4 new members -- "The Four Horsemen" -- were inducted into the Hall of Fame "as a group".

== Inductees ==
The current members of the Blackjack Hall of Fame are the following:

- Al Francesco, 2002, one of the founders of the concept of blackjack teams.
- Peter Griffin, 2002, mathematician, theoretical pioneer and author of The Theory of Blackjack.
- Arnold Snyder, 2002, former professional player, author and editor of Blackjack Forum.
- Edward O. Thorp, 2002, author of the 1960s classic Beat the Dealer
- Ken Uston, 2002, professional player and author who popularized the concept of team play, often playing in disguise and successfully suing the Atlantic City casinos for the rights of card counters.
- Stanford Wong, 2002, author and popularizer of the strategy known as "Wonging".
- Tommy Hyland, 2002, manager of one of the longest-running blackjack teams.
- Max Rubin, 2004, expert and author, known for media reporting about gambling events, and optimizing casino comps.
- Keith Taft, 2004, inventor who manufactured hidden computerized devices to aid advantage play.
- Julian Braun, 2005, pioneering author who used computers to analyze blackjack statistics.
- Lawrence Revere, 2005, author of Playing Blackjack as a Business and blackjack teacher
- James Grosjean, 2006, computer analyst and professional player, author of the classic Beyond Counting, who successfully sued casinos and the Griffin Agency.
- John Chang, 2007, former manager of the MIT Blackjack Team; was the basis for the Mickey Rosa character in the movie 21.
- Roger R. Baldwin, Wilbert Cantey, Herbert Maisel and James McDermott, 2008, collectively known as "The Four Horsemen of Aberdeen" who, while serving in the U.S. Army in the 1950s, discovered and published in the Journal of the American Statistical Association the first accurate basic strategy for Blackjack, using only desk calculators.
- Richard W. Munchkin, 2009, blackjack and backgammon expert, author, film director and producer.
- Darryl Purpose, 2010, former professional advantage player and performing songwriter.
- Zeljko Ranogajec, 2011, professional gambler from Australia, former blackjack professional player.
- Ian Andersen, 2012, expert and author
- Robert Nersesian, 2014, Las Vegas lawyer specializing in lawsuits by players against casinos.
- Don Schlesinger, 2015, author, researcher, columnist, editor of numerous blackjack books, and long-time Blackjack player.
- Bill Benter, 2016, blackjack team manager and horse-racing expert. One of the highest earning gamblers in history.
- Don Johnson, 2017, beat the Atlantic City casinos for over $15 million.
- Wally Simmons, 2018, blackjack and horse handicapping pro.
- Rob Reitzen, 2019
- Anthony Curtis, 2020, blackjack tournament player, author, publisher of the Las Vegas Advisor, a newsletter founded in 1983 that covers discounts in Las Vegas, and operator of Huntington Press.
- Cathy Cat Hulbert, 2022, former Czech blackjack team member. Selected by Card Player Magazine in 1996, as one of the best and smartest card players in the world.
- Blair Hull, 2022, a big player in Al Francesco’s blackjack team in the mid-’70s. Recipient of the first “Ed Thorp Lifetime Achievement Award.
- Maria "the Greek", 2023, the co-founder and one-time manager of “The Greeks” blackjack team.
- Rick "Night Train" Blaine, 2024, author of Blackjack Blueprint: How to Play Like a Pro … Part Time.
- Colin Jones, 2025, co-founder and co-manager of the Church Team, one of the most successful 21st-century card-counting teams, and founder of BlackjackApprenticeship.com.
- Mark Billings (Professional Gambler/Author), 2026, Professional Gambler since 1981, author of The Biased Wheel Handbook, The Ultimate Edge, and Follow the Bouncing Ball, as well as a contributor to numerous publications.

== See also ==
- Gaming Hall of Fame
- Poker Hall of Fame
