= Lenny Frome =

American author and video poker expert

- Born: May 12, 1926
- Died: March 15, 1998 (aged 71)
- Occupation: Author

Lenny Frome (May 12, 1926 – March 15, 1998) was a gambling author and video poker expert best known for his 1994 book Winning Strategies for Video Poker. He is often referred to as the "Godfather" of video poker for his outspoken advocacy of the game and for raising the game's popularity. Frome, at a time when serious gamblers viewed the game as little more than a slot machine, saw the potential the game offered if played with perfect strategy. He provided strategies for dozens of video poker games and showed that with the proper strategy the game offered some of the best odds in the casino.

He also performed mathematical analyses on many other games including Let It Ride, Spanish 21, Caribbean Stud and Five Deck Frenzy. He wrote a total of 9 books on casino gambling including Expert Video Poker for Las Vegas and Expert Video Poker for Atlantic City.

He died in 1998, but his gaming website Compu-Flyers is still considered a leading gambling publication and is now run by his son Elliot Frome.

== See also ==
- Bob Dancer
- Dan Paymar
- Arnold Snyder
