= Paymar =

Paymar is a surname. Notable people with the surname include:

- Dan Paymar, American poker writer
- Jim Paymar, American journalist
- Michael Paymar (born 1953), American politician
