= Dan Paymar =

American video poker expert (died 2020)

- Born: 1936 or 1937
- Died: July 17, 2020 (aged 83)
- Occupation: Computer scientist/engineer
- Website: Official website

Dan Paymar (1936 or 1937 – July 17, 2020) was an American writer and programmer known for his work on video poker strategy. With a professional background in computer programming and engineering, he worked for several companies, including Encyclopædia Britannica, Bendix Computer, and Control Data during a 30-year career in the tech industry. He was also a co-founder of Educational Data Systems (later renamed Point 4 Data Corp.), which created software for the Data General Nova computer. In 1982, he transitioned to developing products for the Apple II platform.

== Biography ==
In 1988, Paymar relocated to Las Vegas, Nevada, where he worked as a casino poker dealer. He began playing video poker recreationally and created a directory of favorable machines and pay tables, eventually publishing Video Poker – Precision Play in 1992. This publication went through multiple editions and helped establish his role in the niche of video poker strategy writing. He followed with Video Poker – Optimum Play in 1998, which is often cited in discussions of statistical approaches to the game.

He also published a newsletter, The Video Poker Times, for over a decade, and collaborated with the Casino Gaming School of Nevada. His approach to video poker was informed by his background in mathematics and programming rather than professional gambling. He developed "Optimum Video Poker," a software tool designed to help users learn optimal strategies, with training features and bankroll analysis tools for various platforms including Macintosh, Windows, and Linux.

While in Las Vegas, Paymar also served as an instructor at the Casino Gaming School of Nevada, training prospective poker dealers (AbeBooks). Beyond writing, he developed the Optimum Video Poker software, a training and analysis tool available for Macintosh, Windows, and Linux platforms. The software includes features for strategy training and bankroll management and is one of the few such programs developed by an active player with a background in programming.

Paymar died on July 17, 2020, at the age of 83.[1]

== See also ==
- Bob Dancer
- Lenny Frome
- Arnold Snyder
