= Blackjack Forum =

Trade journal

Blackjack Forum was a trade journal for professional blackjack players, founded in 1981 and published by Arnold Snyder. Originally a 100-page quarterly journal, it expanded into an online forum which is frequented by professional gamblers, attorneys, industry people, mathematicians, and other aficionados. Along with Stanford Wong's Current Blackjack News, it was considered one of the major newsletters for the blackjack market.

Frequent authors included Nick Alexander, Peter A. Griffin, James Grosjean, Tommy Hyland, and Snyder. Topics involved card counting, betting systems, software, cheating, comps, casino conditions, author and player interviews, and other gambling-related topics such as horse-racing and poker. In 1999, Blackjack Forum was collating player reports and listing casino rules and conditions in over 350 cities in 24 states, and 44 countries.
