= Stanford Wong =

American gambler

John Ferguson (born 1943), known by his pen name, Stanford Wong, is a gambling author best known for his book Professional Blackjack, first published in 1975. Wong's computer program "Blackjack Analyzer", initially created for personal use, was one of the first pieces of commercially available blackjack odds analyzing software. Wong has appeared on TV multiple times as a blackjack tournament contestant or as a gambling expert. He owns a publishing house, Pi Yee Press, which has published books by other gambling authors including King Yao.

== Blackjack ==
Wong began playing blackjack in 1964 while teaching finance courses at San Francisco State University and getting his Ph.D. in finance from Stanford University in California. Not content with the teaching life, Wong agreed to be paid a salary of $1 for his last term of teaching at the school in order to not attend faculty meetings and to pursue his gambling career.

The term "wong" (v.) or "wonging" has come to mean a specific advantage technique in blackjack, which Wong made popular in the 1980s. It involves watching the play of cards in a game without actually wagering your own money, until the count becomes advantageous, and then stepping in and playing only while the count remains in the player's favor, and then stepping out again. "Wonging" is the reason that some casinos have signs on some blackjack tables saying, "No Mid-Shoe Entry", meaning that a new player must wait until exactly the first hand after a shuffle to begin playing.

He has reviewed or acted as a consultant for blackjack writers and researchers, including Don Schlesinger and Ian Andersen.

Wong is known to have been the principal operator of a team of advantage players that targeted casino tournaments including Blackjack, Craps and Video Poker in and around Las Vegas. At the beginning of the team's operation Wong was the primary financier providing the travelling expenses and buy in stakes for the other players. The current owner of the Las Vegas Advisor Anthony Curtis was among the members of this team.

Wong is a member of the Blackjack Hall of Fame.

=== Current Blackjack News ===
In 1979, Wong began publishing monthly newsletters on the subject of blackjack. These grew into one of the major journals for professional blackjack players, Wong's Current Blackjack News, ranking with Arnold Snyder's Blackjack Forum. As of 2007, Wong's newsletter is published via Wong's official website.

The journal contains information about rules and conditions of blackjack games in casinos in the United States and some other countries.

=== Website ===
Stanford Wong's BJ21 has been online since 1997. It contains a free area and a restricted, subscribers-only area, called Green Chip. Every month, one message from the restricted area is selected by Wong as Post of the Month and its author wins a prize of $100.

The record holder for most Post of the Month awards won is the blackjack expert known as MathProf, with a total of 16 wins.

== Craps ==
Wong wrote Wong on Dice which purports to show how the game of casino craps can be beaten through controlled dice throwing. Many blackjack experts are skeptical of Wong's craps claims, and this is a hotly disputed issue—unlike card counting in blackjack, which can be mathematically proven. Wong himself was initially skeptical of the proposition that dice can be controlled in craps.

== Personal life ==
The name "Stanford Wong" is a pseudonym; the author's real name is John Ferguson. His first choice for a pen name was "Nevada Smith," but that name had been taken. "Stanford Wong" was selected by a friend in the PhD program by taking his alma mater as his first name and an Asian last name to provide the "mystique of the Orient".

Stanford Wong Video Poker was published in 1990 by Villa Crespo Software.

Wong lives in La Jolla, California with his wife. They have two grown children who are both college graduates and married. Wong's company Pi Yee Press was based in Las Vegas, but dissolved in or after 2017.

== Books ==
- Professional Blackjack (1975)
- Professional Video Poker
- Wong on Dice (2006). Pi Yee Press (pdf). ISBN 0-935926-26-7
- Blackjack Secrets
- Basic Blackjack (1992). Pi Yee Press, ISBN 0-935926-19-4
- Tournament Blackjack
- Tournament Craps
- Complete Idiot's Guide to Managing your T
- Optimal Strategy for Pai Gow Poker
- Vegas Downtown Blackjack
- Sharp Sports Betting
- Casino Tournament Strategy
- Betting Cheap Claimers
- Winning Without Counting
- Complete Idiot's Guide to Gambling Like a Pro
