= Richard W. Munchkin =

American film producer

- Born: Richard Jacobs; Des Plaines, Illinois, United States
- Education: Columbia College Chicago

Richard W. Munchkin is an American writer, director, producer, radio host and professional gambler.

== Film and television ==
Between 1987 and 1999 Munchkin wrote, produced and/or directed in more than 20 movies and television shows primarily in the adventure genre including Guardian Angel (1994), with Cynthia Rothrock, Evil Obsession (1996), Fists of Iron (1995), Ring of Fire (1991), L.A. Heat (1999). and Edge of the World (2018).

In 2018 Munchkin starred as himself in Inside the Edge: A Professional Blackjack Adventure, a documentary about elite blackjack players.

== Gambling ==
Originally from Des Plaines, Illinois, Munchkin started playing chess and gin rummy at the age of three. His first exposure to the idea of playing for profit came when he was 12, when a family friend mentioned playing backgammon for money. Making about $100 or $200 a week, Munchkin was able to put himself through Columbia College in Chicago where he received a BA in Theater Arts by playing backgammon and poker professionally. After graduating from college in the late 1970s, he moved to Las Vegas and worked as a dealer and occasional pit boss at The Castaways Casino. While working in the casino he learned to count cards, and after a few years was making more money playing blackjack than dealing, so he quit to become a full-time professional blackjack player.

In 2004 Munchkin competed in Season 1 of the World Series of Blackjack, a series of televised blackjack tournaments hosted by the Game Show Network. In 2009 Munchkin was inducted into Blackjack Hall of Fame. On gambling, Munchkin has said in a 2017 interview "I believe that every single game in the casino can be beaten... ...I have played winning games at almost everything."

== Writing ==
In 2002 Munchkin authored Gambling Wizards. In it he chronicles his interviews with some of the most famous gamblers in the world including Doyle Brunson, Tommy Hyland and Chip Reese. He is a contributor to Blackjack Magazine, All in Magazine and Blackjack Forum.

== Radio ==
Munchkin currently hosts a weekly radio show, Gambling with an Edge, which can be heard on KLAV in Las Vegas.

== Bibliography ==
Gambling Wizards: Conversations with the World's Greatest Gamblers Huntington Press, April 2003, ISBN 978-0-929712-05-5

Blackjack Forum Interviews with Tommy Hyland, Al Francesco, among others.
