= Roger Baldwin =

Roger Baldwin may refer to:

- Roger Sherman Baldwin, (1793–1863), US lawyer and politician
- Roger Nash Baldwin, (1884–1981), founder of ACLU
- Roger R. Baldwin (1929–2021), blackjack strategy pioneer
- Roger Baldwin (diver), commercial diver, killed in Waage Drill II accident
