= Aces and eights (disambiguation) =

Two pair, aces and eights, is the "dead man's hand" in poker.

Aces and eights may also refer to:

- Aces & Eights: Shattered Frontier, a 2007 role-playing game
- Aces 'N' Eights, a 2008 made-for-television film
- Aces and Eights (film), a 1936 film directed by Sam Newfield
- Aces and eights (blackjack), two strategic starting hands in blackjack
- Aces & Eights, a professional wrestling stable in Total Nonstop Action Wrestling
