= Four Horsemen of the Apocalypse (blackjack) =

Four Horsemen of the Apocalypse is the name given by gambling authors to the four U.S. Army engineers who first discovered in the 1950s the best playing strategy in the casino game of Blackjack that can be formulated on the basis of the player's and the dealer's cards. The so-called Basic Strategy, which was subsequently refined through the use of computers and combinatorial analysis, loses the least money to the casino in the long term.

== History ==
In 1953, Roger Baldwin, a private in the U.S. Army with a master's degree in mathematics from Columbia University, stationed in Aberdeen Proving Ground, the U.S. Army's oldest active proving ground, was playing dealer's choice poker in the barracks. After a player acting as dealer selected Blackjack, someone remarked that the dealer, as they do in the Las Vegas casinos, would have to stand on 17 and hit on 16. Baldwin was intrigued by this news enough to embark on a project during his off-work hours to discover the optimal playing strategy for the player on the basis of the player's and the dealer's cards, as well as the rules dictating the dealer's play. For this, Baldwin asked the help of Wilbert Cantey, a sergeant at the facility, who had left the seminary because of his hustling at pool and cards and pursued a master's degree in mathematics. They enlisted the help of privates Herbert Maisel, who later became a professor at Georgetown University, and James McDermott, who had a master's from Columbia University.

For their project, the four Army men used only the desk calculators available at the military base, which were called at the time “adding machines.” The result of their work was presented in an analytical study in the Journal of the American Statistical Association, in September 1956, and subsequently in a book titled Playing Blackjack to Win that was published in 1957. With a foreword written by TV quiz-show star Charles Van Doren, it contained a pull-out strategy chart with sections on Draw or Stand, Doubling Down, and Splitting Pairs. The book did not make its authors rich, though it sold out its print run of five thousand copies. "We were a Protestant, a Catholic, a Jew, and a black man," Maisel recalled. "There was concern that putting a black face on the cover would hurt sales in the South," so there was no photo of the authors on the cover.

The book did include, in a chapter titled "Using the Exposed Cards to Improve Your Chances", the first valid card-counting system ever published, but their method was not strong enough to offer a positive-expectation strategy for the player, although it did offer the least costly strategy in the game of casino Blackjack. A gambling expert has claimed that any player who uses the Four Horsemen's basic strategy today "would not be giving up more than a few hundredths of a percent [of expected value] over perfect basic strategy." E. O. Thorp, at a later time, borrowed their notebooks and validated their findings on an IBM 704 computer at MIT.

== Legacy ==
The four originators of Blackjack's Basic Strategy went on with their lives away from casinos and gambling, dedicating themselves to scientific research, teaching and business. But their work caused an immediate sensation in gambling research as well as among professional gamblers. MIT Professor of Mathematics Edward O. Thorp tested their strategy on the university's IBM computers and found it to be accurate "within a couple of hundredths of a percentage point." Thorp went on to formulate the first strong card counting strategy and tested it in actual casino play, in trips he took to Las Vegas, often accompanied by Claude Shannon, who is sometimes referred to as "father of information theory".

The existence of a casino-beating system spread throughout the American gambling and casino circles, and in 1962, E. O. Thorp published his work Beat The Dealer, widely considered to be the original Blackjack advantage-playing manual. The book sold over 700,000 copies and earned a place in the New York Times bestseller list. The publication and subsequent notoriety of the book was the cause at the time behind many casinos changing the rules and conditions of how Blackjack was offered – for example, they stopped dealing single-deck Blackjack down to the last card. After players began complaining, most casinos went back to the previous rules and conditions. The tables were soon full of casual gamblers who believed that by they could now "beat the house," even though most of them never strictly followed Thorp's "complicated," two-parallel-counts system, or even the simpler systems that subsequently appeared, such as High-Low, and the casinos started winning more money than before Thorp's book had appeared.

Thorp's work in turn inspired the research and the exploits of professional blackjack players such as Stanford Wong, Ken Uston, and the MIT Blackjack Teams of the 1990s, as well as many others.

== Recognition ==
In 1965, in an early recognition of the impact that the work of the four U.S. Army men would have on the game of 21, gambling author Dr. Allan N. Wilson labelled them "The Four Horsemen of the Apocalypse" in his book The Casino Gambler’s Guide.

On the night of 4 January 2008, during Max Rubin's 12th annual Blackjack Ball, held in Las Vegas, the Four Horsemen were inducted into the Blackjack Hall of Fame.

During the Ball's festivities, Stanford Wong commented: "Thorp never would have got there without the work of these guys. If Thorp never got there, I don't know that any of us would be here. I don't know how many millions of dollars just the people in this room have made as a result of the work that these guys did." And Max Rubin stated, “If it wasn't for them, not one of us would be in this room." Former member of the MIT Team Johnny Chang said, "When I first read the 1957 article they wrote that appeared in the Journal of the American Statistical Association with an accurate basic strategy, I couldn't fathom how they had accomplished this using desk calculators. It just seemed impossible."

Later in 2008, on the 50th anniversary of its first edition, the book Playing Blackjack to Win was reprinted in the US, with a foreword written by E. O. Thorp, and an introduction by Arnold Snyder. In his foreword, Thorp wrote: "To paraphrase Isaac Newton, if I have seen farther than others it is because I stood on the shoulders of four giants.

== Personal lives ==
Wilbert Eddie "Preach" Cantey, while in the Army, used applied mathematics, statistics and computer technology in research and development work on combat tanks, tank guns, other weaponry and transport vehicles. He designed war games at the Army Strategy and Tactics Analysis Group and he later worked at the State Department's Arms Control Agency as a statistician. He retired from the U.S. Department of Transportation's Federal Railroad Administration as deputy director in operations research analysis. Cantey died on 21 May 2008 at the age of 77 at the Genesis Layhill Center in Silver Spring from pancreatic cancer.

James McDermott worked some years for the federal government and then as an IBM executive for thirty-three years. At the Blackjack Hall of Fame induction, E.O. Thorp inscribed McDermott's copy of Beat the Dealer with the dedication, "Thanks for your paper, which ultimately led to this book." He had once mused, "everybody sort of knew who we were, but nobody really knew [us]." He recalled e-mailing a "well-known blackjack expert" on the 50th anniversary of the Horsemen's book, and the expert's response began with, "My God, you guys are still alive?" McDermott died in 2018, aged 88.

Herbert Maisel, the only member of the team without a college degree at the time, went on to teach computer science at Georgetown University where he became chair of the computer science department. A Georgetown student later recalled approaching him to talk about the Horsemen's achievement, only for Maisel to "dismissively" respond with "It was four guys with desk calculators, what else do you want to know?" and walk away. Maisel died in 2019, aged 88.

Roger Rauschenbusch Baldwin worked as a systems administrator for Union Carbide and the City of New York. He had once confided to the MIT campus newspaper, The Tech, that his knowledge of Blackjack had "ended with the first edition of [Thorp's] Beat the Dealer." He died on 10 January 2021 at his home in Riverhead, Long Island. He was 91 and the last surviving member of the Four Horsemen.

== See also ==
- Advantage gambling
