= Rob Reitzen =

American mathematician and blackjack player

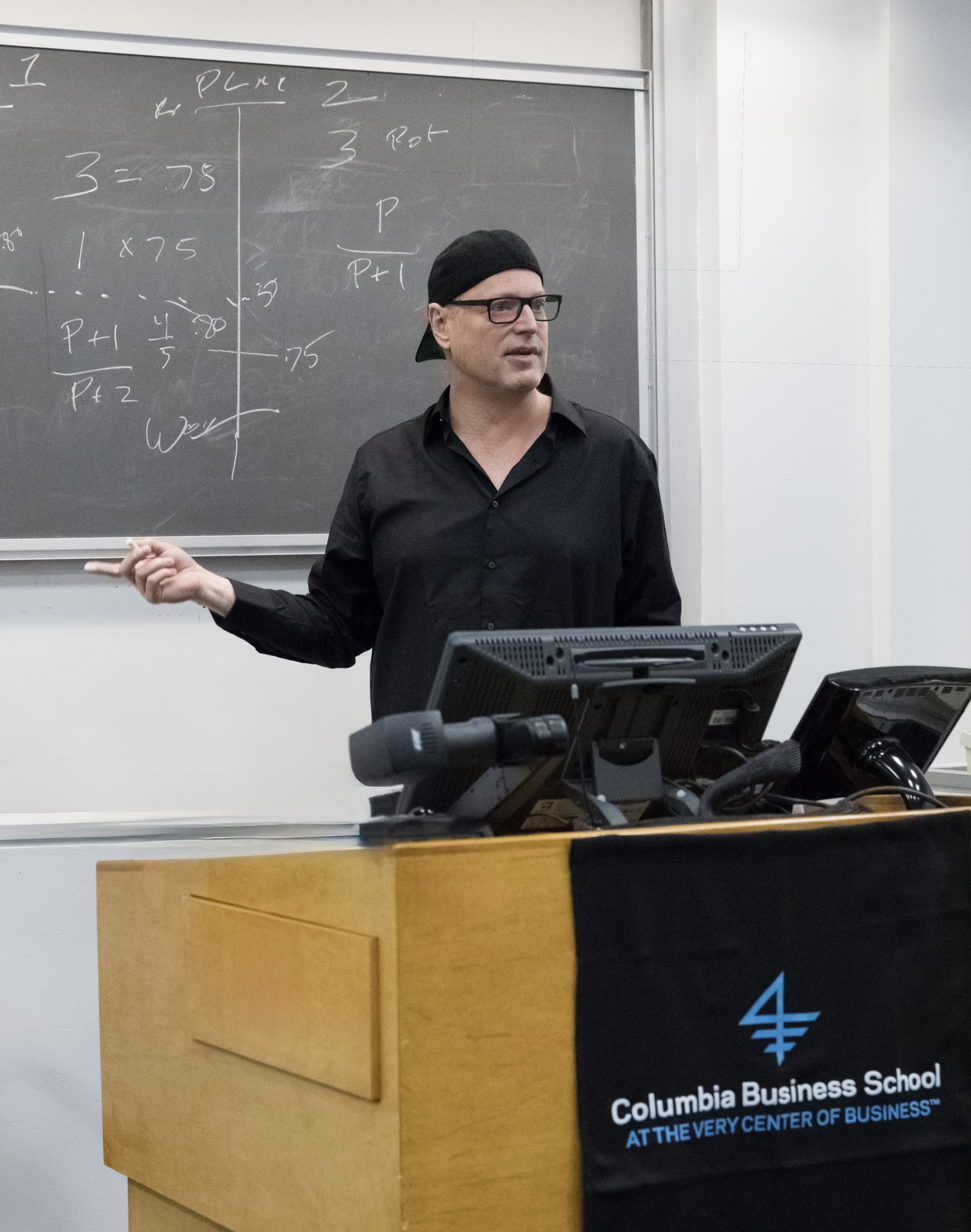
- Education: University of California, Los Angeles
- Known for: Advanced blackjack technique "The Hammer"
- Awards: Blackjack Hall of Fame (2019)
- Scientific career
- Fields: Mathematics, Probability, Blackjack

Rob Reitzen is an American mathematician and professional blackjack player.

== Biography ==
Reitzen studied mathematics and probabilities at the University of California, Los Angeles. He was initially interested in poker, but shifted his focus to blackjack after reading Lawrence Revere's Playing Blackjack as a Business.

In the early 1980s, Reitzen worked with a colleague who later became influential in horse betting technology in Hong Kong. They used emerging computer technology to develop advanced blackjack techniques, including card counting systems, shuffle tracking, and improved methods for memorizing card sequences.

In the early 1990s, Reitzen co-founded CORE, a company that provided financial and operational support to Native American casinos, including supplying both the bankroll and dealers for blackjack games.

Reitzen also specialized in Texas hold'em poker and developed a mathematical strategy that led to the formation of a successful team under his guidance, which achieved notable success on the Full Tilt Poker platform. He later developed another mathematical technique with John Wayne and Darrell Miers that was offered as a service to casinos, as well as to stock and futures markets.

In 1997, Reitzen was featured in Esquire magazine in an article titled "Fleecing Las Vegas", which described his use of a technique known as "The Hammer" at Caesars Palace. The method combined card counting, shuffle tracking, ace location, and card sequence memorization, and reportedly resulted in winnings of $500,000.

In 2019, Reitzen was inducted into the Blackjack Hall of Fame.

Reitzen is the founder of Random Order Inc and a co-founder of StyleScan, a B2B software specializing in artificial intelligence.

== Recognition ==
- 2019: Blackjack Hall of Fame
