= High roller =

Gambler who wagers large amounts of money

A high roller, also referred to as a whale or cheetah, is a gambler who consistently wagers large amounts of money. High rollers often receive lavish "comps" from casinos to entice them onto the gambling floors, such as free private jet transfers, limousine use, and use of the casinos' best suites. Casinos may also extend credit to a player to continue betting, and offer rebates on betting turnover or losses; and contracts of employees may also contain incentive arrangements to bring in high rollers.

The definition of a high roller varies. At Crown Casino in Australia, for example, it involves bringing between AUD$50,000 and $75,000 to the table. Casinos compete on bet limits. In Australia, limits of AUD$300,000 are common; in Las Vegas, they are between US$150,000 and $300,000; and in Macau, they are up to US$500,000. Only richer casinos can accommodate high-stakes gambling due to the volatility of results.

High rollers may also be subject to exceptions from various rules and regulations; for example, the high roller rooms at Crown Casino in Melbourne, Australia are the only licensed venue in the state not subject to a ban on smoking.

High rollers are said to provide only a small fraction of casino business. John Eidsmoe, in his book Legalized Gambling: America's Bad Bet, claims that it is actually gamblers from the lower and lower-middle classes in the United States that provide much of the gambling money. "The occasional wealthy 'high roller' does indeed exist, but he is the exception, not the standard. The fact that more than 50% of Nevada's gambling income comes from slot machines as opposed to the card tables should be an indication high rollers are not the main source of revenue."

There have been many cases around the world where high rollers have committed fraud to provide funds for gambling beyond their means, after becoming seduced by the lifestyle. This was the case with famed gambler Terrance Watanabe, who reputedly lost over $220 million in Las Vegas over a 5-year period, and was ultimately sued by Caesars Entertainment for failing to pay up on markers (interest-free loans offered to "whales") he took out during the binge totaling $14.75 million.

Related to high rollers are "low rollers", a loosely defined term whose meaning changes with context. This can be anything from a casino regular patron who nevertheless wagers very low amounts of money — perhaps just enough to participate in casino loyalty programs and "comps" — to any average low-spending tourist.

== See also ==
- Casino host, an employee of the casino that delivers services to maintain loyalty
- Louis Theroux: Gambling in Las Vegas, a BBC documentary profiling some high rollers
- Free-to-play#Comparison with traditional model, similar phenomenon observed in video games
