= Peter A. Griffin =

American mathematician and author

- Born: July 19, 1937; New Jersey, U.S.
- Died: October 18, 1998 (aged 61)
- Education: Portland State University; University of California, Davis

Peter A. Griffin (July 19, 1937 – October 18, 1998) was an American mathematician, author, and blackjack expert and is one of the original seven members of the Blackjack Hall of Fame. He authored The Theory of Blackjack, considered a classic analysis of the mathematics behind the game of casino 21.

== Early life ==
Griffin was a native of New Jersey, one of three children, with a brother, poet Alan MacDougall, and a sister, Barbara Dan, writer. His grandfather Frank Loxley Griffin was a mathematician at Reed College who had written various mathematics textbooks.

Griffin's father was an actuary who went on to head up a labor/management consulting company in Chicago.

Griffin grew up in Williamsport, Pennsylvania, Chicago and Portland, Oregon, and married Lydia.

== Academic studies and teaching ==
He studied at Portland State University, and received a master's degree from the University of California, Davis. He taught statistics, calculus and differential equations at California State University, Sacramento from 1965 until his death on October 18, 1998, from prostate cancer.

== Blackjack ==
His first exposure to blackjack was in 1970, when he proposed a course on the mathematics of gambling, and went to Nevada to do some research. As the New York Times put it, he "promptly got his clock cleaned," and this incentivized him to do more serious research on the subject.

He was known for compiling extensive statistics on blackjack players in Atlantic City, and then comparing patterns against players in Las Vegas or Reno.

Griffin wrote the 1979 book, The Theory of Blackjack: The Compleat Card Counter’s Guide to the Casino Game of 21, which is considered to be a classic in the field. Although heavily mathematical, the book contained gems that could be found and exploited by the careful reader. For example, one chart appearing on just one page of The Theory of Blackjack led at least one blackjack team to develop a strategy that won hundreds of thousands of dollars.

Griffin along with Anthony Curtis is cited as coming up with the title for the main column of the Las Vegas Advisor, 'Couponomy'. Curtis states "Griffin pointed out that the suffix “omy” typically means to extract, so Couponomy meant extraction via coupon".

The main passion of Peter Griffin remained teaching, which is where he devoted most of his working life.

Peter Griffin died on October 18, 1998, at the age of 61.

== Works ==
- The Theory of Blackjack, 1979, Huntington Press, ISBN 0-915141-02-7
- Extra Stuff: Gambling Ramblings, 1991, Huntington Press, ISBN 0-929712-00-5

== Notes ==
- Griffin is unrelated to the private, casino-consulting firm Griffin Investigations. Professional blackjack players refer to The Theory of Blackjack as "Griffin's book," whereas the notorious book published by Griffin Investigations is simply referred to as "Griffin."
