= Casino host =

Casino employee

A casino host is employed by a casino to deliver services to gamblers to help ensure that they become loyal patrons.

== Nature of the work ==
A casino host will usually try their best to please patrons of their casino and will do their best to fulfill any reasonable requests their clients might have. The casino host has the power to issue complimentary services (or "comps") to players. Comps can range from complimentary meals, beverages, and show (concert or theater) tickets right up to full accommodation in a hotel casino. A casino host will develop a relationship with every level of gambler, from first-timers playing quarter slots to high-profile multimillion-dollar gamblers (a high roller).

Comps issued by hosts vary greatly and can be anything from a free buffet coupon, overnight hotel accommodation and upgrade, or entertainment tickets, to luxurious villas and private charter flights to the casino. The level and issuance of these comps by the host is done using mathematical formulas that calculate a player's theoretical loss (also known as "ADT" for average daily theoretical, or "theo"), based on wager size, session length, and the house edge of the game. Based on this formula, the host will be authorized to re-invest a percentage of the house's theoretical win back into the player by issuing freebies with the aim of building a loyal relationship with the player.

== Position in a casino ==
The casino host reports directly to the marketing managers in most casinos. The casino host is the member of management that has the most contact with players and patrons. The job of a casino host can be very competitive as they are seeking the repeat patronage of players, a common goal that is shared both among other hosts within the casino as well as with those at competing casinos.
