= Super Fun 21 =

Blackjack variant

Super Fun 21 is a variation of blackjack. The game is played using a standard 52 card deck. Aces can be counted as either a one or eleven depending on which value would best benefit the player's hand. All the face cards in the deck each count as ten. The remaining cards are taken at face value. The player must first place a bet and is then dealt two cards face up. The dealer is dealt two cards as well, but one is face up and one face down. The player then has the option to either "hit", (request another card) or "stand" (decline additional cards). The player's hand must beat the dealer's by coming closer to 21 without "busting" (exceeding 21). A winning hand with a total of 21 is called a blackjack, or natural.

The game differs from traditional blackjack because the player automatically wins if his hand has six cards or more with a total of 20. This rule applies even if the dealer has a total of 21 (blackjack). Other advantages to Super Fun 21 include being able to split a hand up to four times, a player's blackjack supersedes a dealer's blackjack, a player may "double down" at any point no matter how many cards he has been dealt, and the player automatically doubles their money with a hand consisting of five cards or more that total 21.

The other major difference between Super Fun 21 and traditional blackjack is that a blackjack only pays 6 to 5 instead of the traditional 3 to 2 payout. This more than makes up for the edge the casino is giving with the liberal rules variations above.

Super Fun 21 was protected by U.S. Patent number 5,979,897 issued in 1999 to Howard F. Grossman, a well-known Las Vegas gaming consultant, and assigned to Tech Art Management, Inc.

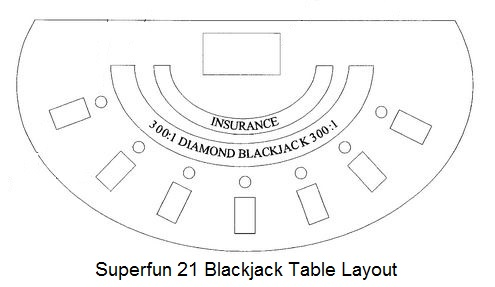

Special Side Bet. Player can place a "side bet" on getting a blackjack in a designated suit (e.g. diamonds) only in the first round of a newly shuffled deck or decks. The payout is 300:1 (as indicated in the diagram). Some casinos allow player to designate suit or suits for this special side bet. Due to the high house edge on this side bet (9.2%), it is not popular and most land based and on line casinos excluded this from their games.

Not to be confused with a similar blackjack variation called Fun 21.
