= James Grosjean =

American blackjack writer

James Grosjean is a gambling expert and author best known for his 2000 book Beyond Counting: Exploiting Casino Games from Blackjack to Video Poker. He became a professional player while studying as a graduate student at the University of Chicago's Department of Economics. Grosjean's book provides a mathematical treatment of various forms of legal advantage play in casino games. His latest book, Exhibit CAA: Beyond Counting provides information for playing modern casino games with an advantage.

Grosjean is well known in the gambling community for his legal victories over two major casinos and an investigative agency they employ. In 2004 he won a $400,000 jury verdict against the Imperial Palace (now The Linq) for an illegal detention (due to Nevada statute and ongoing appeals, the final amount is still undetermined). He also won jury verdicts including punitive damages against Caesars Palace and Griffin Investigations, the latter declaring bankruptcy as a result of the litigation. Legal action is pending against four agents of the Nevada Gaming Control Board. His attorneys for these matters are Bob Nersesian and Thea Sankiewicz.

Grosjean is the youngest ever person to be inducted into the Blackjack Hall of Fame and continues to play blackjack around the world. He competed in the Ultimate Blackjack Tour, a televised 10-week series that aired on CBS.
