= Darryl Purpose =

American singer-songwriter

Darryl Purpose is an American singer-songwriter, known for his narrative (often very personal) lyrics and fingerstyle guitar. Before becoming a professional musician, Purpose was a professional blackjack player and was known as one of the best in the world. In 2010 Purpose was inducted into the Blackjack Hall of Fame. "Purpose has the voice of James Taylor, the brains of Bob Dylan, and the soul of Willie Nelson".

In 1986, Purpose walked across the United States with The Great Peace March for Global Nuclear Disarmament and then a year later in the former Soviet Union. In 1996, he became a "full-time national touring singer-songwriter" who "hit the folk scene...with an unusually eclectic resume that provided him with a wealth of compelling stories to tell." As of December 2011, Purpose has returned to touring full-time, returning from an unexplained seven-year hiatus.

When Darryl Purpose was 16 years old, his mother put a book called "Beat the Dealer" in his Christmas stocking. He went to Las Vegas as a teenager and began a career as professional card player – and still calls this the "only real job I’ve ever had." Years later, he took time off to walk across the country for peace, and fell in with a bad crowd – musicians and peaceniks. In 1996, inspired by his work with a traveling band of musical activists, Purpose began to tour nationally as a solo singer-songwriter. Eight years, six CDs and a thousand-plus shows later, he was headlining venues like the Freight and Salvage, Club Passim, McCabe's, The Bluebird Cafe, The Kennedy Center, and the Kerrville Folk Festival Main Stage.

In 2005, he inexplicably set down his guitar and took a seven-year sabbatical in the Rocky Mountains. During this time, he shepherded the release of Singer-Songwriter Heaven: the songs of Kevin Faherty. He also continued to co-captain the Second Strings Project, which is responsible for delivering over twenty thousand sets of guitar strings to those who need them all around the world. In 2009, he was inducted into the Blackjack Hall of Fame, one of 17 members, including Ed Thorp, the man who wrote that book that his mother put into his Christmas stocking at 16. He says that he also “got healthy, in multiple ways.”

2012 saw Purpose record his first CD of original material in 10 years – Next Time Around, produced by Billy Crockett for the Blue Rock Artists label. With no formal radio promotion, the CD spent five weeks at #1 on the Roots Music Report folk chart for national radio airplay in March and April 2013.

== Outreach ==
While in the former Soviet Union, Purpose took note of the many talented musicians playing instruments that were unfit for their level of expertise and left several guitars with them. Later, in El Salvador, he witnessed how the people would alter guitars that were falling apart to still be able to play music. To the end of assisting struggling musicians across the globe, Purpose and Kevin Deame announced the beginning of The Second Strings Project in 1999. They collect used guitar strings from artists in the United States and distribute them to needy musicians around the world.

== Collaboration ==
Purpose has co-written songs with a handful of fellow songwriters, including short story writer and author Robert Morgan Fisher, as well as the author-songwriter-photographer Paul Zollo, with whom Purpose has written many songs, including "The Ghost of Crazy Horse," "Baltimore," which details the mysterious death of Edgar Allan Poe, "Koreatown," and "Crooked Line," which tells the story of Chavez Ravine, and was the title song of Purpose's 2001 album. Their song "California (Rutherford Hayes in the Morning)" tells the story of this mostly forgotten president, the first to ever travel to California. For Purpose's 2013 Next Time Around, they wrote songs, including "Dreams of Life" and "Orange Raincoat."

== Discography ==
- 1996: Right Side of Zero
- 1997: Same River Twice
- 1999: Travelers' Code
- 2001: A Crooked Line
- 2002: The Gift of the Magi (and other seasonal stories)
- 2005: Live at Coalesce CD/DVD
- 2012: Next Time Around
- 2015: Still The Birds
