= Thomas Hyland =

American blackjack player

- Education: Wittenberg University
- Occupation: Blackjack player
- Awards: Blackjack Hall of Fame

Thomas Hyland is an American professional blackjack player and a 2002 inductee to the Blackjack Hall of Fame. Hyland studied political science at Wittenberg University in Springfield, Ohio. Since 1979, he has been recognized for his role in forming and managing two blackjack teams. Hyland is also a card counting expert.

== Blackjack Forum 2002 interview summary ==
In a 2002 Blackjack Forum interview, Hyland reported that he started his blackjack career in 1979 after having been inspired by Lawrence Revere's book Playing Blackjack as a Business. His original blackjack team had four players who each put $4000 into the team bankroll. The team was launched when Atlantic City casinos offered blackjack with the early surrender rule, which gave knowledgeable players an edge. Within months, the Hyland team had built their bankroll to roughly $50,000.

When conditions worsened for card counters in Atlantic City, Hyland's original teammates began playing in Asia. Hyland stayed in Atlantic City and recruited golf buddies to form a new team. Hyland's blackjack team has used multiple advantage gambling techniques, including computer play, shuffle tracking, and ace sequencing. All these methods gain players a higher edge than card counting and are harder for casinos to detect.

In 1994, members of the Hyland blackjack team were arrested after an ace sequencing team play at Casino Windsor. A Blackjack Forum article documents how three Las Vegas casinos influenced authorities in Windsor to prosecute the players for cheating. The case was seen by professional gamblers as an attempt to establish a legal precedent finding blackjack team play and ace sequencing strategies illegal. The judge, referring repeatedly in his written decision to expert testimony from Arnold Snyder, ruled that the players' conduct was not cheating but merely the use of intelligent strategy.

The longevity of the Hyland team is unusual among blackjack teams, which often fall apart due to discouragement or suspicion among team members during losing streaks. Many former members attribute the Hyland team's success not only to Tommy Hyland's knowledge of gambling, but to his exceptional ability to engender loyalty and trust among team members. Tommy Hyland was elected by professional gamblers as one of the 7 original inductees into the Blackjack Hall of Fame.
