= Double Attack Blackjack =

Blackjack variant from Atlantic City

Double Attack Blackjack is dealt primarily in Atlantic City casinos.

The game is a variation of Spanish 21 that pays even money on a blackjack and gives the player the opportunity to double their initial wager after seeing the dealer's upcard. The game also offers a bonus side bet (called Bust It!, Bust out or Buster) on whether or not the dealer will bust on the third card. This side bet must be made before the dealer's upcard is dealt, and pays out based on the rank of the card dealt. The bet only pays off if the dealer busts on the third card, and the payoffs are as follows:

- Third card is a ten. Pays off 3 to 1.
- Third card is a nine. Pays off 6 to 1.
- Third card is an eight. Pays off 8 to 1.
- Third card is a seven. Pays off 10 to 1.
- Third card is a six. Pays off 15 to 1.

There is an additional payoff if the dealer has an eight in the hand and gets another eight of the same color or suit and busts. Those payoffs are as follows:

- The eight is the same color. Pays off 50 to 1.
- The eight is the same suit. Pays off 200 to 1.

Moreover, the Bust it! side bet may pay off according to the number of cards the dealer busts with. The payouts will be as follows:

- Dealer busts with 3-4 cards. Pays off 2 to 1.
- Dealer busts with 5 cards. Pays off 4 to 1.
- Dealer busts with 6 cards. Pays off 12 to 1.
- Dealer busts with 7 cards. Pays off 50 to 1.
- Dealer busts with 8 cards. Pays off 250 to 1.

Double Attack Blackjack has some specific rules:

- 8 Spanish 48-cards decks are used
- Dealer stands on a soft 17
- If a player takes insurance, a dealer peeks for blackjack
- Insurance payout is 5 to 2
- A player has a right to double down after splitting
- A player can split aces once and receive one more card
- All cards except aces can be re-split 4 times
- No re-doubling for this type of blackjack
- A player can double or surrender any time during a game
