= Glossary of blackjack terms =

List of definitions of terms and concepts used in the game of blackjack

The following is a glossary of terms used in the card game blackjack. This is not intended to be a formal dictionary; precise usage details and multiple closely related senses are omitted here in favor of concise treatment of the basics.

== 8 ==
86'd

Being told by a casino that you are being removed, generally due to suspected advantage play.

== B ==
balanced count

Any counting system which has an exact balance between plus cards and minus cards. In such a system, if the deck were counted down to the bottom, the sum would be zero.

blackjack
1. A card game in which players try to approach 21 but not exceed it
2. The best possible hand in the game blackjack, made up of an ace and a card valued at 10 (namely, 10, J, Q, K).
bust

Having a total over 21.

bust card

The individual card that brings the hand's total over 21.

basic strategy

A collection of actions that will offer the best odds off the top of the deck. These actions vary when different rules are applied to the game.

== C ==
CSM

Initialism for continuous shuffling machine.

== D ==
double or double down

After seeing their hand, a player can double by placing an additional bet equal to their original bet and drawing one and only one additional card. This move may only be used on the first two cards.

== E ==
even money

When the dealer shows an ace and the player has a blackjack, the player can opt for even money and get paid immediately at 1:1. This is a version of insurance rather than a different bet. If the dealer has blackjack, the hand is a push, but the player receives twice the value of the insurance, which is the same as the original bet. If the dealer does not have blackjack, the player wins 1.5 times the value of the original bet but loses the value of the insurance and still ends up with the value of the original bet.

== F ==
first base

The betting spot located to the dealer's left, which is first to receive cards.

five card Charlie

A bonus or automatic win in some games when a hand contains five cards without busting.

== H ==
hard hand

A hand without an ace or a hand where the ace must count as 1 to avoid busting.

hit

To ask for another card. If that extra card makes the total over 21, then the player busts.

hole card

A dealer card that is dealt face down and not revealed to players until after they have acted upon their hands.

== I ==
insurance

When the dealer shows an ace, the player can choose to place a side bet of up to half the value of the original bet. If the dealer has blackjack, the bet pays 2:1. If the dealer does not have blackjack, the player loses the wager.

== N ==
natural

A two card total of 21. A blackjack.

== P ==
penetration

A number or fraction that represents how many cards/decks will be dealt before shuffling in contrast to the total number of cards/decks in play. It may be expressed in percentage form or as a fraction where the denominator is always the total number of decks in play such as "4.5/6" or "75% penetration".

pitch game

A blackjack game dealt from the hand of the dealer, normally using 1 or 2 decks

push

A tie; the player and dealer have hands with the same total below 22.

== S ==
shoe

A device used to hold multiple decks of cards, typically 4, 6 or 8. Cards are dealt one at a time from the shoe.

shoe game

A blackjack game dealt from a shoe. Shoe games typically use more than 2 decks.

soft

A soft hand is a hand that includes an ace valued as 11, as opposed to 1.

split

If a player is dealt two cards of the same rank, they can choose to play each of them separately, putting up a bet for each one.

stand

To stop asking for more cards.

stiff

Any hard hand where the possibility to exceed 21 exists by drawing an additional card namely 12, 13, 14, 15 or 16

surrender

To surrender is to abandon your hand, while recovering half of your initial bet. This is only available as your first and only action.

== T ==
third base

The betting spot located on the dealer's right which is last to act.

== U ==
upcard

The card that the dealer is showing.
