= Comp (casino) =

Complimentary items and services from casinos

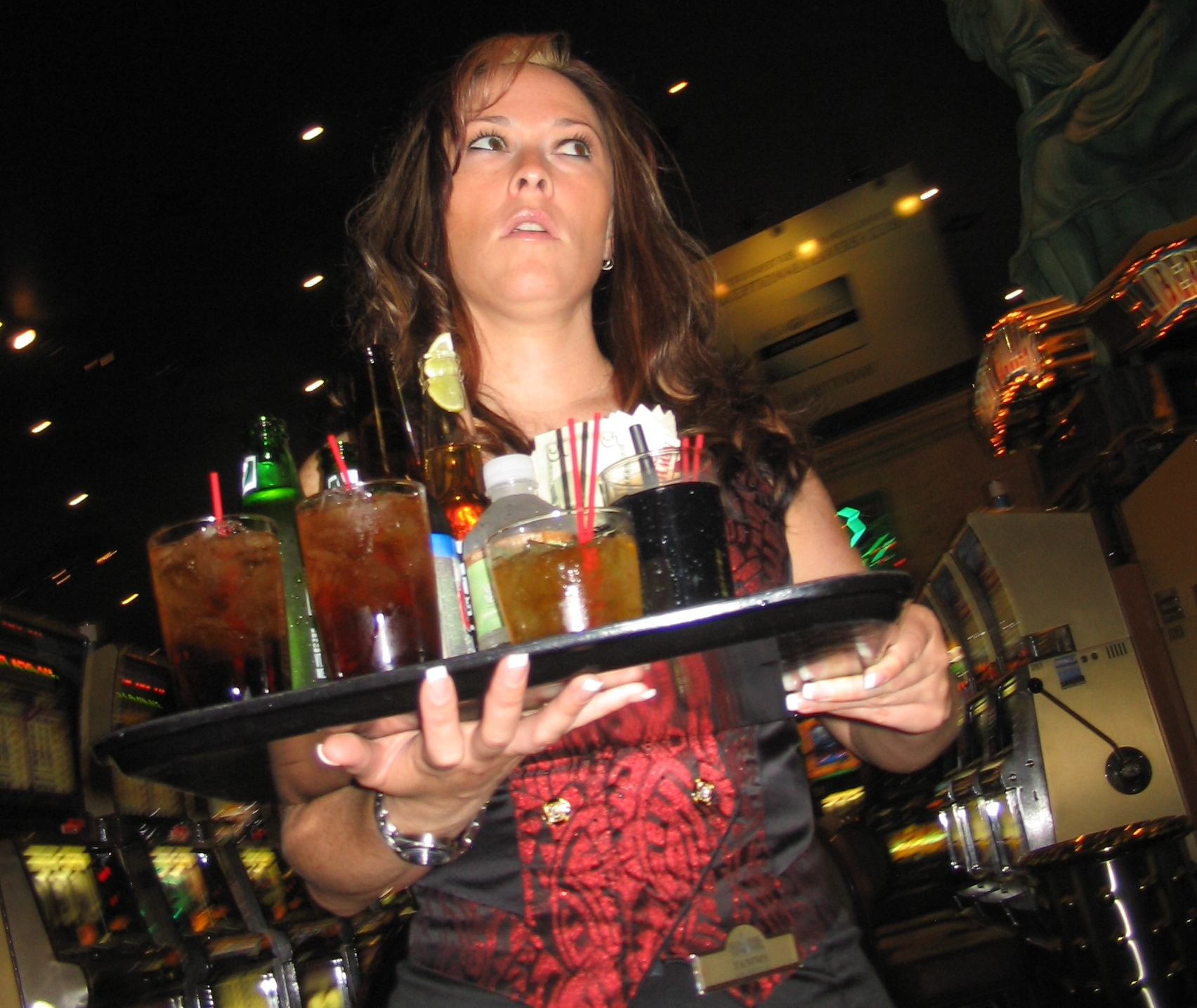
Wait staff serving drinks at a Las Vegas casino. Many casinos offer complimentary drinks to patrons.

Comps are complimentary items and services given out by casinos to encourage players to gamble. The amount and quality of comps that a player is given usually depends on what games they play, how much they bet, and how long they play.

Most casinos have casino hosts responsible for awarding comps and contacting players to bring them back to the casino. Pit bosses can also award comps at table games. Casino hosts, marketing staff, and other casino employees may all be responsible for issuing comps as part of player development and marketing operations, rather than there being a dedicated standalone “comp management” profession. Most casinos ask players to get a player's club card so their play can be tracked and comps awarded accordingly.

== Levels ==
The lowest level of comp is complimentary alcohol. Many casinos provide complimentary drinks to anyone gambling.

The second level of comp is complimentary self-parking, lounge access, or meals. Many casinos have players' lounges and restaurants and might require more play to earn a comp to higher-end restaurants. Often, the player is given a certain amount to spend, but sometimes high rollers might get to order as much food as they want and bring guests.

The next level of comps is complimentary lodging, valet parking, and access to more exclusive high roller lounges. Many casinos have attached hotels, but those that do not can sometimes comp rooms to a hotel nearby. Many casino hotels have better rooms, such as suites, villas, and presidential suites for bigger betters. Many players who get hotel rooms also get a package called "RFB" (for "room, food and beverage") or "RF" (for "room and food").

Many casinos also offer other comps, especially to high rollers. These can include airfare, limo rides, show tickets, golf, concierge services, cash back, loss rebates, private gaming areas, and private jet service.

Casinos also often offer players comps by mail, email, or app. These can include complimentary bet offers, meals, discounted or complimentary rooms, tournament entries, or prize drawings. These offers often come with terms and conditions for rollover and wagering requirements.

Some casinos contract with bus companies to bring players. Riders often enjoy complimentary slot play and dining coupons, often worth as much as the bus fare itself.

== Calculation ==
Technically, every player may be offered comps, but most casinos require players to have played for a given period of time and at a certain level; the duration of play and amount wagered are directly proportional to the level of expected comps. Which games are played are also factors. Casinos award comps based on a player's average daily theoretical loss (known as ADT, theoretical loss, or "theo"). Theoretical loss is the amount of money a player is expected to lose based on the long run statistical advantage the casino has on the particular game being played. Theoretical loss algorithms differ by casino, but the logic behind the calculation generally works like this:

Theoretical Loss = (Casino Advantage) × (Total Wager)

== Comp hustling ==
"Comp counters", "comp hustlers", or "comp wizards" try to maximize comps while minimizing expected losses. Comp hustlers play games with a low house edge, such as blackjack or video poker, or games with small bet sizes, such as penny slots. Comp hustlers use tactics such as placing large bets when a pit boss is checking their bet size to rate them for comps and then moving to a smaller bet size when the boss is not watching. They also take frequent breaks from playing, play at full tables to be dealt fewer hands per hour and play more slowly.

== Online comps ==
Online casinos, poker rooms, and sportsbooks offer bonuses similar to brick and mortar casino comps. Comp hustlers and advantage players can use these bonuses to turn a profit via bonus hunting or can convert these comps to a guaranteed profit using matched betting. Online casinos know of the potential for losing money while giving out bonuses and have minimum wagering requirements as a result. Some casinos limit the payout in case of a win. They also sometimes restrict players from playing games with a low house edge.
