= Griffin Investigations =

Investigators of the United States gambling industry

- Industry: Business services Security; Gambling industry
- Founded: 1967; 59 years ago
- Founder: Beverly and Robert Griffin
- Area served: United States
- Website: Official website

Griffin Investigations was once the most prominent group of private investigators specializing in the United States gambling industry; roughly half of the major casinos in the US once subscribed to Griffin's services. The company was founded in 1967 by Beverly S. Griffin and Robert R. Griffin.

The company maintained dossiers on card counters, serial jackpot winners, and other individuals, chiefly professional gamblers using legal techniques to gain an advantage in casino games; these profiles were regularly published in the Griffin Book and distributed to subscribing casinos. Griffin Investigations was instrumental in ending the MIT Blackjack Team’s winning streak, after a Griffin investigator purchased the names, photographs, and other details identifying the group's members, and the company distributed the information to casinos.

Griffin also marketed a controversial facial recognition system that used computer software to compare gamblers' faces against several volumes of mug shots. Beverly S. Griffin, the firm's co-founder and co-owner, estimates as many as half of Southern Nevada's casinos now use biometric technology to identify the faces of card cheats or other undesirables. However, a Las Vegas casino surveillance director (writing under the pseudonym Cellini) reported in the book, The Card Counter's Guide to Casino Surveillance (2003), that biometric technology was considered virtually useless by actual casino surveillance operatives because of overwhelming numbers of false reads.

== History ==
The Las Vegas Sun reported on September 13, 2005 that Griffin Investigations had filed for Chapter 11 bankruptcy protection in light of legal costs and damages from a successful defamation lawsuit against the company. The lawsuit had been brought by two gamblers, Michael Russo and James Grosjean, claiming they had been improperly detained, labeled as cheaters and arrested, on the basis of information supplied by Griffin. The judgement of a jury in Clark County District Court, in June 2005, ordered Griffin Investigations to pay $15,000 to Michael Russo and $10,000 to James Grosjean in punitive damages; and Griffin Investigations and Caesars Palace were each ordered to pay Russo and Grosjean actual damages of $25,000 each.

According to the minutes of the Private Investigators Licensing Board for 18 June 2008, Beverly Griffin said that her ex-husband had retired, and she was seeking to purchase his half of the business. She said all Chapter 11 payments were up to date, all requirements had been met and she had, as advised by counsel, changed the way information was supplied, using data encryption.
