= Cat Hulbert =

American gambler (1950–2022)

Cathy Hulbert
- Born: 1950 (age 75–76)
- Died: September 20, 2022
- Occupation: Professional gambler

Cathy "Cat" Hulbert (1950 – 2022) was an American professional gambler. She was one of the world's first professional female card counters. Card Player magazine named her one of the top seven-card stud players in the world in 1996.

== Life ==
Hulbert was born in 1950, one of six children of a truck driver and a nurse. She left school at 15 and put herself through college. She first developed an interest in gambling when investigating the industry as an assistant to the minority leader of the New York State Senate, took a course in blackjack dealing, and in 1977, at the age of 25, moved to Las Vegas.

Hulbert became one of the first professional female card counters, a member of the Czechoslovakia team, and a companion to Ken Uston. She then moved on to 7-card stud and dated David Heyden. In 1996, Card Player magazine named her one of the top 7-card stud players in the world, the only woman on the list. The Game Show Network called her "the best female gambler on Earth". She taught poker classes for women.

At one time, Hulbert employed people over the age of seventy to play casino slot machines for her.

In 2016, she was named as one of BBC's 100 Women.

== Personal life ==
Hulbert was diagnosed with bipolar disorder in 1990. She was married twice, both ending in divorce. Since a bout with cancer, she had retired as a gambler and worked as an online casino consultant. She died on September 20, 2022 from cancer.
