= Nick Alexander (author) =

English writer

Nick Alexander is an English writer. His first novel, 50 Reasons to Say Goodbye, was published in 2004.

== Early life ==
Alexander was born in 1964 and grew up in the seaside town of Margate, England. He has traveled widely and lived in Wolverhampton (UK), Cambridge (UK) and New York City (US). He has been living in the south of France since 1990.

== Writing ==
Alexander's first novel, 50 Reasons to Say Goodbye, was published in 2004. He initially self-published his novels, but went on to publish with publishing houses such as Atlantic Books, Black & White Publishing, Lake Union and Bookouture. Translations have been published by Bastion Forlag (Norway), Sonzogno (Italy), Pegasus (Turkey), City Editions (France) and Amazon Crossing (Germany, Italy, Spain).

=== Novels ===
- In This Life We Sing (2026)
- A Little Bit of Sunshine (2025)
- Where Do We Go From Here? (2024)
- The Imperfection of Us (2023)
- Perfectly Ordinary People (2022)
- From Something Old (2021)
- The Road to Zoe (2020)
- You Then, Me Now (2019)
- Things We Never Said (2017)
- The Bottle of Tears (Let the Light Shine) (2016)
- The Other Son (2015)
- The Photographer's Wife (2014)

Hannah series

- The Half-Life of Hannah (2012)
- Other Halves (2014)

Missing Boyfriend series

- The Case of The Missing Boyfriend (2011)
- The French House (2013)

50 Reasons series

- 50 Reasons to Say Goodbye (2004)
- Sottopassaggio (2005)
- Good Thing, Bad Thing (2006)
- Better Than Easy (2009)
- Sleight of Hand (2010)

=== Short story collection ===
- 13:55 Eastern Standard Time (2007)

=== Translations ===
- The Photographer's Wife has been translated to French, German, Italian, Norwegian and Croatian.
- The Other Son has been translated to French, German, Italian and Spanish.
- The French House has been translated to Turkish.
- The Bottle of Tears has been translated to the French language.
- The Half-Life of Hannah and Other Halves have been translated to the Norwegian language and were published by Bastion Forlag in 2013/2014.
- The Case of the Missing Boyfriend has been translated to the Italian language and was published by Sonzogno in 2012. (Title: Le ambigue verità del cuore).
