= Stanford Wong Video Poker =

1990 video game

- Developer: Villa Crespo Software
- Publisher: Villa Crespo Software
- Release: 1990

Stanford Wong Video Poker is a 1990 video game published by Villa Crespo Software.

== Gameplay ==
Stanford Wong Video Poker is a game in which the best possibilities and probabilities are shown for video poker.

== Reception ==
Michael S. Lasky reviewed the game for Computer Gaming World, and stated that "Villa Crespo Software has done it again: found a way to make better gamblers out of all of us, while we have fun learning just how to accomplish this seeming impossible feat."
