= Bob Dancer =

American writer and video poker expert

- Born: 1947 (age 78–79)
- Education: University of California, Los Angeles
- Occupation: Writer
- Spouse: Shirley Dancer (div. 2013)
- Website: bobdancer.com

Bob Dancer (born 1947) is an American video poker expert and gambling author best known for his book Million Dollar Video Poker, which recounts six years of video poker experiences. The book details a six-month period, Sept 2000 to March 2001, when Dancer and his wife parlayed a six thousand dollar bankroll into over one million dollars playing video poker. The cover of the book was a photo taken to replicate the $400,000 winning hand that Dancer's wife Shirley hit, the largest of their 6-month winning period.

== Biography ==
Dancer previously co-authored a weekly column with Jeffrey Compton entitled the Players Edge which listed various promotions at Las Vegas Casinos and was published Fridays in the Las Vegas Review-Journal. He also is a contributor to the Las Vegas Advisor and to the monthly magazine Strictly Slots.

In his May 7, 2013 Las Vegas Advisor column, Dancer announced that he and his wife Shirley had divorced.

Bob Dancer has been teaching classes at various casinos in Las Vegas and elsewhere since 1997. Currently he teaches two semesters a year at the South Point in Las Vegas.

Dancer's latest book is Video Poker for the Intelligent Beginner. He has written two novels, Sex, Lies, and Video Poker and More Sex, Lies, and Video Poker. Along with co-author Liam W. Daily, Dancer has published six Winner's Guides for various video poker games. He is the prime video poker expert behind the Video Poker for Winners software.

Currently he writes a weekly online article for the Las Vegas Advisor. More than 400 of Dancer's articles are archived on his site. He also co-hosts, with Richard W. Munchkin, a weekly hourlong radio program called Gambling With An Edge on Thursday evenings at 7 p.m. on KLAV 1230 AM in Las Vegas. The shows are streamed live on the radio website and are archived on Dancer's website.

He is an alumnus of the University of California, Los Angeles.
