= Black Book (gambling) =

List of people barred from entering United States casinos

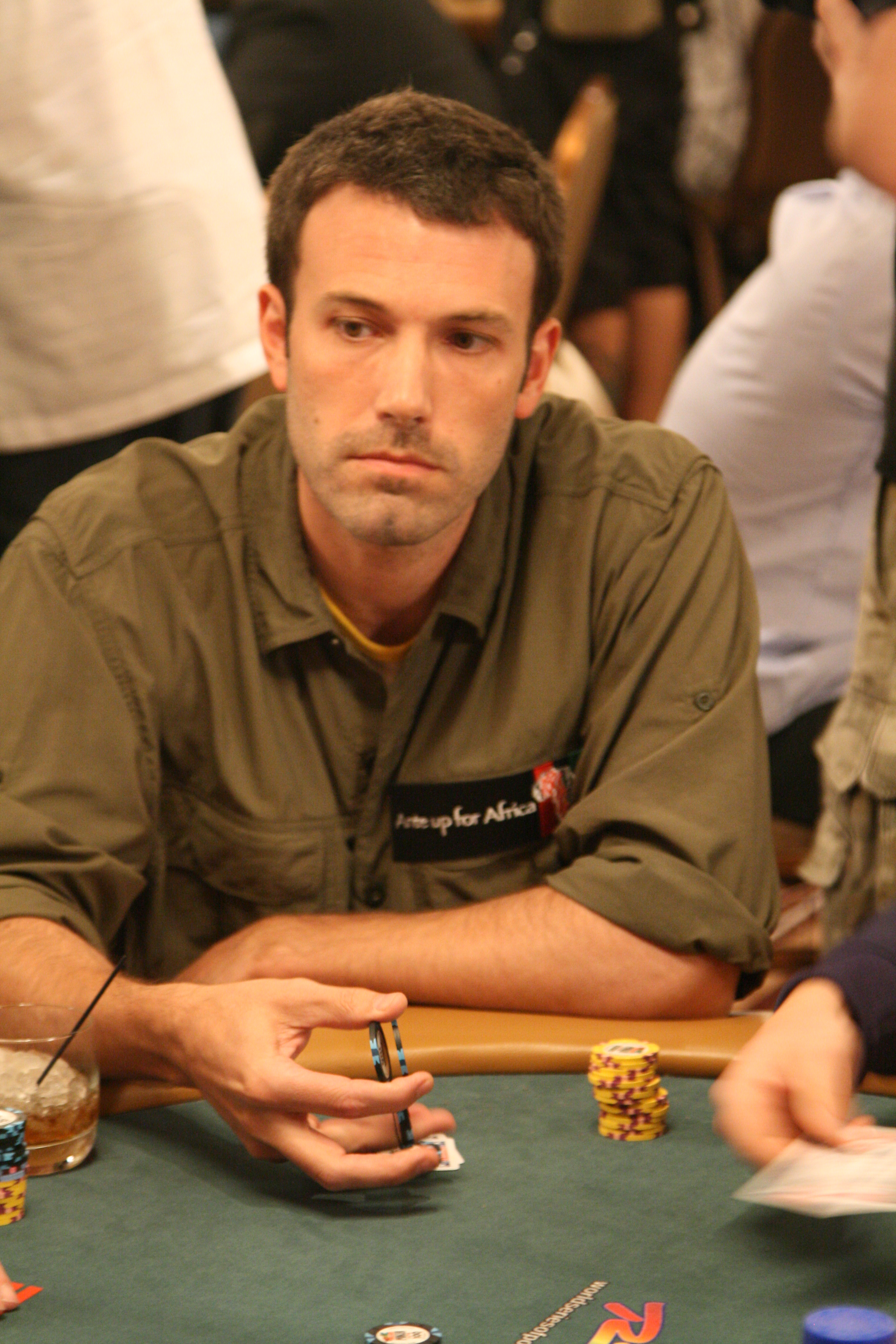
Ben Affleck was blacklisted from Hard Rock Hotel and Casino Las Vegas in 2014

"Black Book" is the nickname frequently used to refer to a list of people who are unwelcome in casinos. The name is due to the people listed being blacklisted. The term can refer either to such a list officially maintained by a particular gaming control board or, in the US, to the Griffin Book, whose information is shared among subscribing casinos.

In the case of gaming control boards, people listed are generally suspected of having, or known to have, ties to organized crime. Casinos are obliged by regulations to exclude all such people from entry and can be subject to sanctions for failure to do so.

In the Griffin Book, published by Griffin Investigations, listed individuals are generally suspected of being, or known to be, either legal advantage players or illegal cheaters at casino games. Thus, casinos find it to their economic best interest to exclude such individuals. Those listed may be anyone perceived as a threat to the casino's profits, whether through legal means, such as card counters, or through illegal means, such as people who mark cards or those who try to cheat slot machines. Also included are those considered a threat to the casino, such as players the casinos believe are winning either too much or too often, even if their exact methods are unknown. The book includes photos of the individuals taken when detained, or when questioned and released, or from surveillance footage. At least one successful defamation lawsuit has been brought as a result of the Griffin Book.
