= Arnold Snyder =

American blackjack player

Arnold Snyder (12 February 1948 – 6 June 2023) was a professional gambler and gambling author. He was elected by professional blackjack players as one of the seven original inductees into the Blackjack Hall of Fame – hosted at Barona Casino – for his contributions as a blackjack player and his innovations in professional gambling techniques. He was the first blackjack authority to publish the importance of deck penetration (depth of the deal) in card counting, in his 1980 book The Blackjack Formula. He was also the first blackjack researcher to argue (in Blackjack Forum, 1981–1983) that radical simplification of blackjack card counting systems did not substantially decrease earnings.

Since 1981, Arnold Snyder has been the editor of Blackjack Forum, a quarterly trade journal for professional gamblers. In 2004, Snyder moved the publication of Blackjack Forum from print to online due to time constraints imposed by playing more frequently and the frustration with dealing with the business side of the publication industry. Blackjack Forum has published many articles about professional gambling, discussion of strategies and approaches for various games and interviews with many professional gamblers including Al Francesco, Keith Taft and Marty Taft, Thomas Hyland, Johnny Chang, Darryl Purpose.

His book Blackbelt in Blackjack is a guide to card counting and other professional gambling techniques in blackjack, with an emphasis on advice for winning in real-life casino play. In his book The Blackjack Shuffle Tracker's Cookbook, he published the first mathematical analysis of the value of different types of blackjack shuffle tracking, as well as the first analysis of how to most profitably track today's more complicated casino shuffles.The Big Book of Blackjack covers the history of blackjack, especially the history of the achievements of blackjack's most successful professional players.

In 1987, Snyder released a 5-part book series, 64-page blackjack guides that analyze the profitability of counting cards when various numbers of decks are in play: Beat the 1-Deck Game (1987), Beat the 2-Deck Game (1987), Beat the 4-Deck Game (1987), Beat the 6-Deck Game (1987) and Beat the 8-Deck Game (1987).

In 2006, his book The Poker Tournament Formula provides mathematical analysis of the optimal strategy for multi-table poker tournaments with blind levels lasting less than an hour. The book also includes analysis of bankroll requirements for professional poker tournament players, as well as mathematical analysis of optimal poker tournament rebuy strategy.

Snyder has reviewed books by numerous gambling authors including the first edition of "Blackjack Attack" by Don Schlesinger and "The Blackjack Life" by Nathaniel Tilton and has exposed numerous phony gambling systems. Snyder's recommendations on gambling books and systems can be found at his websites.

Arnold Snyder is also known as an advocate for the rights of professional gamblers. His testimony in the Windsor, Ontario trial of blackjack team manager Tommy Hyland was instrumental in preserving the legal right to blackjack team play in Canadian and U.S. casinos. He has also testified as an expert witness in court cases involving the rights of blackjack hole-card players and dealer-tell players.

Arnold Snyder also compiled a book, Radical Blackjack that was due for publication in 2011 but was not released at that time. Snyder decided not to publish the book due to some of the discussed techniques still being actively used by professional players and as such not wishing to endanger the integrity of the plays. The book was, however, finally published on June 1, 2021.

Snyder died on June 6, 2023 at age 75.

== Books by Arnold Snyder ==
- Blackbelt in Blackjack ISBN 1-58042-143-1
- Big Book of Blackjack ISBN 1-58042-155-5
- How to Beat the Internet Casinos and Poker Rooms
- How to Beat the One-Deck Game
- How to Beat the Two-Deck Game
- How to Beat the Four-Deck Game
- How to Beat the Six-Deck Game
- How to Beat the Eight-Deck Game
- Radical Blackjack
- The Poker Tournament Formula
- The Poker Tournament Formula 2
- The Blackjack Shuffle-Trackers Cookbook: How Players Win (And Why They Lose) With Shuffle Tracking
- The Blackjack Formula
- The Over/Under Report
