= Matched betting =

Betting technique

Matched betting (also known as back bet matching, lay bet matching, or double betting) is a betting technique employed by individuals to profit from free bets and incentives offered by bookmakers. Its proponents consider it risk-free in theory-based probability.

== Concept ==
The concept of matched betting requires an account with two or more bookmakers or betting exchanges where at least one offers the user a free bet. When the free bet is placed the other bookmakers or betting exchanges are used to hedge all the possible outcomes so that no matter what happens the value of the free bet is retained. At its simplest, a matched bet involves placing a back bet using the free bet at a bookmaker while placing the opposing lay bet at a betting exchange. More advanced versions involve placing the bets on multiple bookmakers (dutching) to avoid the commission charged for using an exchange. Generally, bookmakers incorporate terms by which bettors must first place a bet using their own money in order to qualify for the free bet. For this, a bet is placed on particular results occurring with the bookmaker and a second bet placed on the same result not occurring at the betting exchange. The latter is required to offset any loss in the event that the result does not occur; for instance, if a team loses. Once the free bet has been qualified, the same process is followed with the exception that a free bet is being used. No matter which result occurs, there will always be a guaranteed profit because the bet was made free of charge. Online betting outlets, betting exchanges, have become popular in recent years because they allow betters to bet without official odds-makers. In essence, the person placing the lay bet acts as a bookmaker.

== Approaches ==
There are several common strategies for matched betting including assisted and manual betting. Assisted matched betting refers to websites or software packages which provide comparison tables of markets for individuals to bet on. These are commonly known as 'oddsmatchers'.

== Industry reactions ==
Matched betting is legal, and a spokesperson for William Hill has indicated that the betting industry does not have a problem with this use of free bets.

== Matched betting services ==
The growth of matched betting has led to the formation of matched betting services – usually, subscription-based businesses established to make the process easier with step-by-step instructions and bespoke software.

== Taxation ==
In the UK gambling by individuals, including matched betting, is not taxable as gamblers usually lose; if it were taxable, there would have to be tax relief for losses. UK HM Revenue & Customs use criteria called "badges of trade" to determine whether an activity is taxable trade.

Matched betting, along with all other betting, is tax-free in Italy.

== See also ==
- Mathematics of bookmaking
