= Advantage gambling =

Legal methods used to gain an advantage while gambling

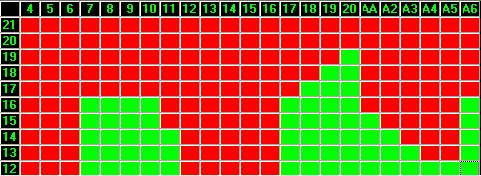
A guide to hole-carding in Blackjack

Advantage gambling, or advantage play, refers to legal methods used to gain an advantage while gambling, in contrast to cheating. The term usually refers to house-banked casino games, but can also refer to games played against other players, such as poker. Someone who practices advantage gambling is often referred to as an advantage player, or AP. Unlike cheating—which is by definition illegal—advantage play exploits innate characteristics of a particular game to give the player an advantage relative to the house or other players. While not illegal, successful advantage play may result in players being banned by certain casinos.

A skillful or knowledgeable player can gain an advantage at a number of games. Card games have been won by card sharps for centuries. Some slot machines and lotteries with progressive jackpots can eventually have such a high jackpot that they offer a positive return when played over the long term, according to gambling mathematics. However, this method requires information that is often difficult to acquire regarding the settings of the specific slot machine, details of the specific casino, knowledge of statistics and probability, and a large enough bankroll to withstand the inevitable volatility. Some online games can be beaten with bonus hunting.

== Examples ==
=== Special offers ===
Using special offers provided by bookmakers, it is possible for a skilled bettor to put the odds in their favor. Special offers may include cashback on specific events, enhanced odds, and comp points. To profit from these specials, skilled bettors will use betting, laying, and dutching to create their own books on an event that may not guarantee profit but will still put the odds in their favor instead of the bookmakers' involved. Sign-up bonuses are also classed as special offers and can be used in a similar way to lock in a profit regardless of the result using the principles of matched betting.

=== Betting exchanges ===
Betting exchanges offer advantage players a chance to make a larger profit than possible with bookmakers because exchanges charge commission only on the net winnings in a particular betting market.

=== Blackjack ===
Blackjack and other table games can sometimes be beaten with card counting, hole carding, shuffle tracking, edge sorting, or several other methods. The players most skilled in these techniques have been nominated to the Blackjack Hall of Fame.

== Video poker ==
Some video poker games, such as full pay Deuces Wild, could be beaten if played with perfect strategy devised by computer analysis of the game. However, as of 2023, full pay Deuces Wild video poker is no longer known to exist at any casino since Sam's Town Hotel and Casino near Las Vegas, Nevada, became the last casino to remove the game. Technically, there are some other varieties of video poker that can result in a positive long-term expected rate of return, but the long term can be extremely long, the margins very low, and the strategies much more complicated to memorize compared to Deuces Wild. Current versions of Deuces Wild video poker are played exactly the same as the original "full pay" version; however, they now offer smaller payouts for winning hands compared to the "full pay" version. This increases the house edge against a perfect player to slightly over 0%, meaning even a player who plays perfectly will still almost certainly lose money over the long term.

Similar to the Blackjack Hall of Fame, there is an internet "Video Poker Hall of Fame".

Some video poker games with a progressive jackpot for a royal flush offer in excess of 100% payback when the jackpot amount exceeds a certain level. Organized teams of video poker players are known to occupy banks of machines in this situation, playing until the jackpot is won (which may take many hours).

== Poker ==
Poker can offer a long-term advantage to a skilled player because it is played against other players and not against the house. The casino usually takes a rake (commission) or a time charge. Whether a poker player can win enough from the game to cover the rake and make a profit depends, aside from the rake level, not only on the player's skill, but also on the opposition's lack thereof - the degree of difficulty can vary widely from casino to casino. Tables with relatively easy opposition are referred to as "soft".

There is another advantage to playing poker as opposed to games where play is against the house: since the house has no direct interest in the outcome of a poker game, successful poker players can operate openly without risk of being banned by casinos.

While in the short term luck primarily determines a poker player's results, over the long term the skilled player will invariably profit if playing against weaker competition.

In live settings, some players will take advantage of tells; that is, opponents' facial expressions and mannerisms that may give away information about the strength of the player's hand. Skilled players use all available information (not only an opponent's actions earlier in a hand, but also his or her actions during previous hands) to assess which action will be most profitable, be it a call or a fold, a bluff or a bet for value.

== Other types of advantage play ==
=== Dice control ===
Experts disagree about whether an advantage can be gained at some other games. One example is dice control. Authors Stanford Wong and Frank Scoblete have stated that by setting and throwing the dice in a certain way players can alter the odds at the game of craps enough to gain an advantage.

=== Pachinko ===
In the Japanese game of pachinko, there are numerous purported strategies for winning, the most reliable of which is to use inside information to learn which machines have the highest payout settings. Because of the "Stock", "Renchan", and tenjō systems, it is possible to make money by simply playing machines on which someone has just lost a huge amount of money. This is called being a "hyena". Hyenas are easy to recognize, roaming the aisles for a "Kamo" ("sucker" in English) to leave their machine in a favorable mode.

=== Angle shooting ===
"Angle shooting" is another type of advantage play. One way to get an advantage at a casino is "hole carding", where players try to look at the dealer's hole card in blackjack and then use that information to play their hands differently. This clearly gives an advantage to the player since knowing an opponent's cards reduces the risks involved in the game. Taking advantage of incorrect payouts is another example of angle shooting. For example, if an inexperienced dealer pays 2-to-1 on a blackjack instead of 3-to-2, not correcting him or her is also taking advantage of an incorrect payout.

"Angle shooting" can also happen in poker. For instance, in no-limit poker, a player may hide high-denomination chips behind stacks of low-denomination chips, giving off an appearance that their stack is less powerful than it really is. Another example is making an illegal move, which the player may later declare void if it suits them. While angle shooting is seen as "fair game" in games against the house, it is heavily frowned upon when competing against other players, as it ruins the table atmosphere, makes the game less appealing to novices, and is not in the spirit of the game.

Casinos and playrooms continually create new rules to defeat angle shooting techniques.

=== Comp hustling ===
Comp hustling can be another form of advantage gambling. Players known as comp hustlers or comp wizards, who play games with a low house advantage or low bet sizes such as penny slots, can get more than their expected loss in free items from the casino. Many advantage players also take steps to maximize the comps they receive from their play.

=== Roulette wheel ===
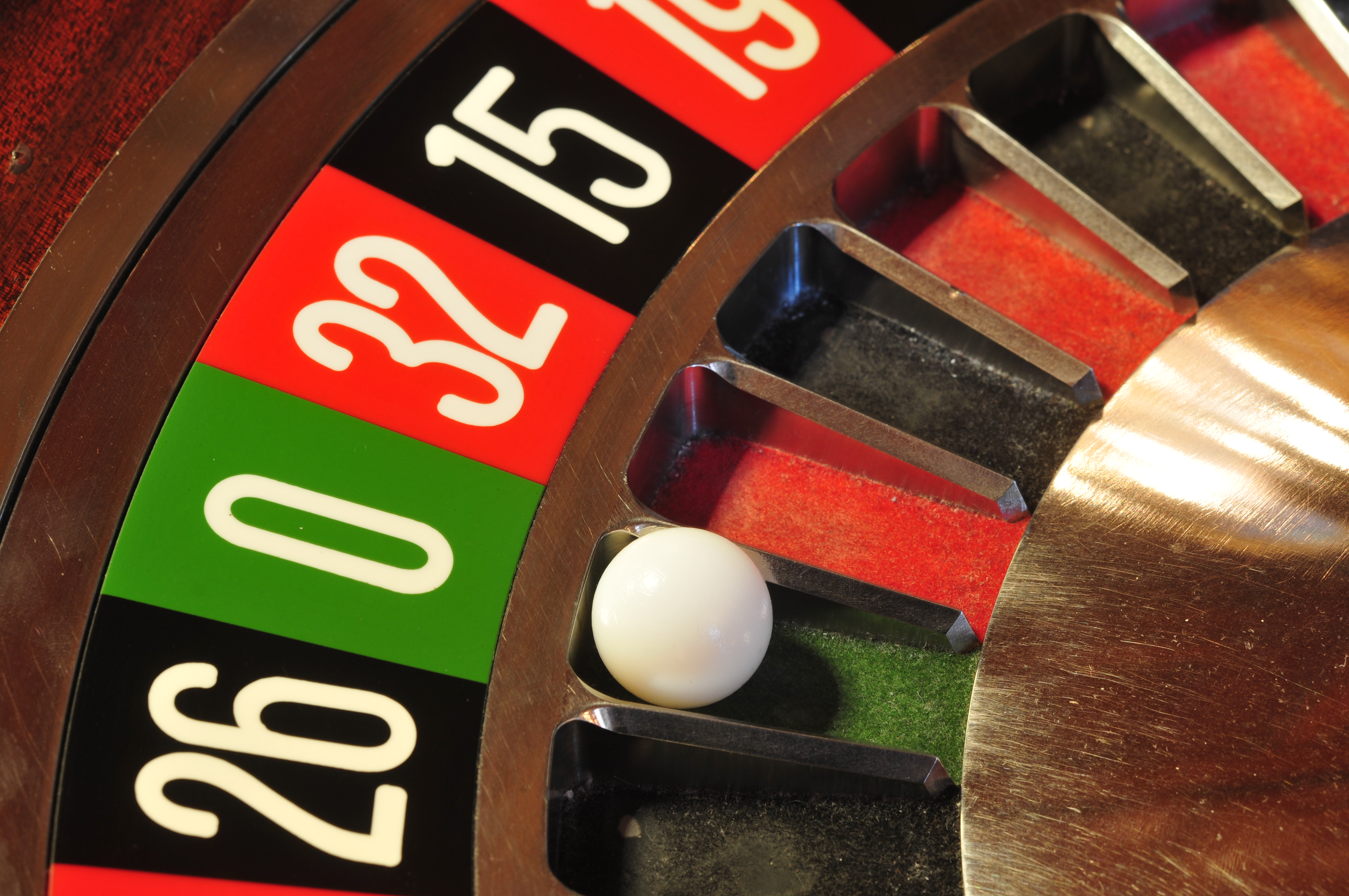
Roulette wheels may be subtly biased towards certain numbers due to wear or manufacturing defects, which can be exploited by advantage gamblers

Roulette wheels with manufacturing defects or uneven wear may land on some numbers (or, more likely, a certain grouping or groupings of numbers in close proximity on the wheel as opposed to the numbers' location on the betting board) with a statistically significant greater frequency. It is sometimes possible, though very rare in practice, through observing large numbers of spins or noting patterns of wear on the wheel's surface, to determine when this is the case and bet accordingly. Physician Richard Jarecki was able to exploit this to great effect at European casinos in the 1960s and 1970s. A group of physicists known as the Eudaemons exploited a similar pattern.

=== Exploiting weaknesses in casino machinery ===
Weaknesses in casino card shuffling machines that allow a skilled player to predict which cards are likely to be dealt next have been exploited on at least one occasion.

== Casino countermeasures ==
Casinos sometimes take measures to thwart players who they believe could potentially pose a threat to their profits, especially card-counters or hole-card players. However, some casinos tolerate card-counters who do not bet large amounts, who are not good at counting, or who do not use a large betting spread.

A countermeasure practice used by some casinos, which has long been considered controversial, involves shuffling the deck or decks earlier than would typically be done when the remaining cards are more likely to be favorable to the player than to the casino—a practice known as "preferential shuffling". The practice has become even more controversial as casinos introduce new technology to aid them in preventing skilled players, and sometimes even unskilled players, from winning at blackjack or other card games involving skill in addition to pure luck. Other examples of common countermeasures (roughly in order from least to most restrictive to the player) include imposing betting limits, asking players not to play blackjack anymore while still welcoming them to stay and play other gambling games (a practice known as "backing off" or "being backed off"), asking a player to leave the casino (with varying degrees of either professionalism or intimidation), or issuing a formal trespass order against the player. On rare occasions, advantage players have been severely physically assaulted by casino personnel. In New Jersey and Missouri, a player may not be legally asked to leave a blackjack table or casino for counting cards, although the casino may still impose betting limits or shuffle sooner.

Players suspected by a casino of counting cards, hole-carding, or other advantage play may find themselves listed in the Griffin Book (or a similar agency's database) and become unwelcome in most casinos. The Griffin Book was sued, but there are other substitutes today.

In the past, video poker and skillful progressive slot machine players were rarely ejected for winning, but the practice is common today. They may have their comps reduced or eliminated.

Skillful sports bettors, known as "sharps", may have their betting limits reduced and may not be allowed to take advantage of bonuses at online sports books. Instead, skillful sports bettors may rely on "runners" to place and collect their bets.

Craps players are required to bounce their throws off the back wall of the table, to prevent a skilled thrower from affecting the outcome.

Advantage players abide by the established rules of the game and thus, in most jurisdictions, are not regarded as committing fraud against the casino. So, while they may face the above casino-imposed sanctions, they are able to operate without the threat of criminal prosecution for their behavior. This is not the case in all jurisdictions, however, and some advantage players have reported more aggressive countermeasures being taken even in well known gambling locations such as Monte Carlo in Monaco.

== See also ==
- Arbitrage betting
- Matched betting
