= Blackjack =

Gambling card game

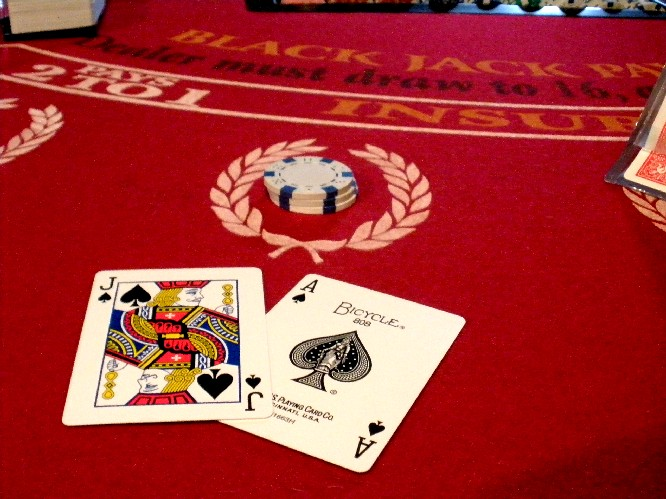
- A blackjack example, consisting of an ace and a 10-valued jack card
- Alternative names: Twenty-one
- Type: Comparing
- Players: 2+, usually 2–7
- Skills: Probability, Memorization
- Cards: 52 to 416 (one to eight 52-card decks)
- Deck: French
- Play: Clockwise
- Chance: High

Related games
- Pontoon, twenty-one, Siebzehn und Vier, vingt-et-un, Ochko

Blackjack (formerly black jack or vingt-un) is a casino banking game. It is the most widely played casino banking game in the world. It uses decks of 52 cards and descends from a global family of casino banking games known as "twenty-one". This family of card games also includes the European games vingt-et-un and pontoon, and the Russian game Ochko. The game is a comparing card game where players compete against the dealer, rather than each other.

== History ==
Blackjack's immediate precursor was the English version of twenty-one called vingt-un, a game of unknown provenance. The first written reference is found in a book by the Spanish author Miguel de Cervantes. Cervantes was a gambler, and the protagonists of his "Rinconete y Cortadillo", from Novelas Ejemplares, are card cheats in Seville. They are proficient at cheating at veintiuno (Spanish for "twenty-one") and state that the object of the game is to reach 21 points without going over and that the ace values 1 or 11. The game is played with the Spanish baraja deck.

"Rinconete y Cortadillo" was written between 1601 and 1602, implying that veintiuno was played in Castile since the beginning of the 17th century or earlier. Later references to this game are found in France and Spain.

The first record of the game in France occurs in 1888 and in Britain during the 1770s and 1780s, but the first rules appeared in Britain in 1800 under the name of vingt-un. Twenty-one, still known then as vingt-un, appeared in the United States in the early 1800s. The first American rules were an 1825 reprint of the 1800 English rules. English vingt-un later developed into an American variant in its own right which was renamed "blackjack" around 1899.

According to popular myth, when vingt-un was introduced into the United States (in the early 1800s, during the First World War, or in the 1930s, depending on the source), gambling houses offered bonus payouts to stimulate players' interests. One such bonus was a ten-to-one payout if the player's hand consisted of the ace of spades and a black jack (either the jack of clubs or the jack of spades). This hand was called a "blackjack", and the name stuck even after the ten-to-one bonus was withdrawn.

French card historian Thierry Depaulis debunks this story, showing that prospectors during the Klondike Gold Rush (1896–99) gave the name "blackjack" to the game of American vingt-un, the bonus being the usual ace and any 10-point card. Since blackjack also refers to the mineral zincblende, which was often associated with gold or silver deposits, he suggests that the mineral name was transferred by prospectors to the top bonus hand. He could not find any historical evidence for a special bonus for having the combination of an ace and a black jack.

In September 1956, Roger Baldwin, Wilbert Cantey, Herbert Maisel, and James McDermott published a paper titled "The Optimum Strategy in Blackjack" in the Journal of the American Statistical Association, the first mathematically sound optimal blackjack strategy. This paper became the foundation of future efforts to beat blackjack. Ed Thorp used Baldwin's hand calculations to verify the basic strategy and later published (in 1963) Beat the Dealer.

== Rules of play at casinos ==
Blackjack example game

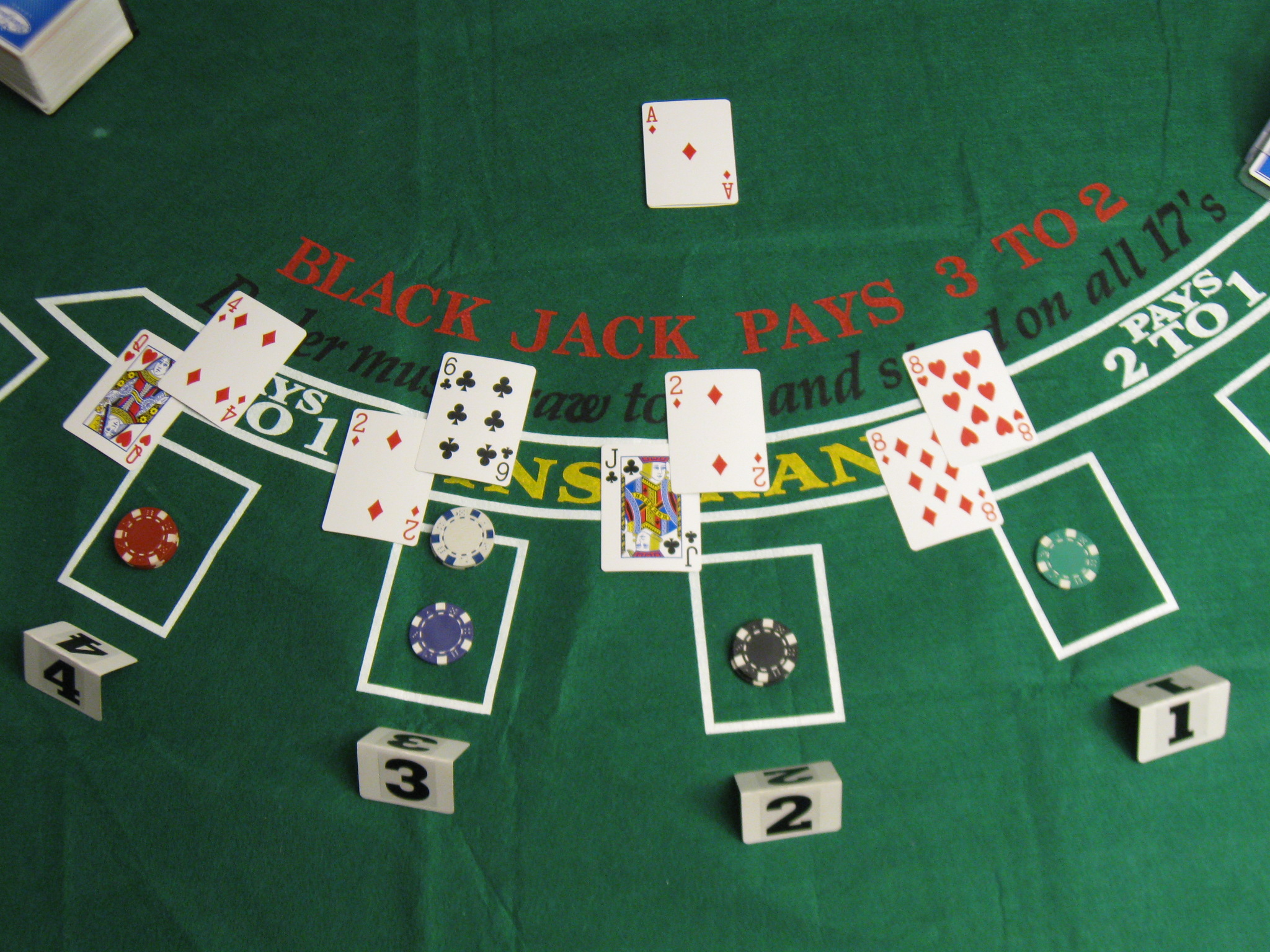
Initial deal

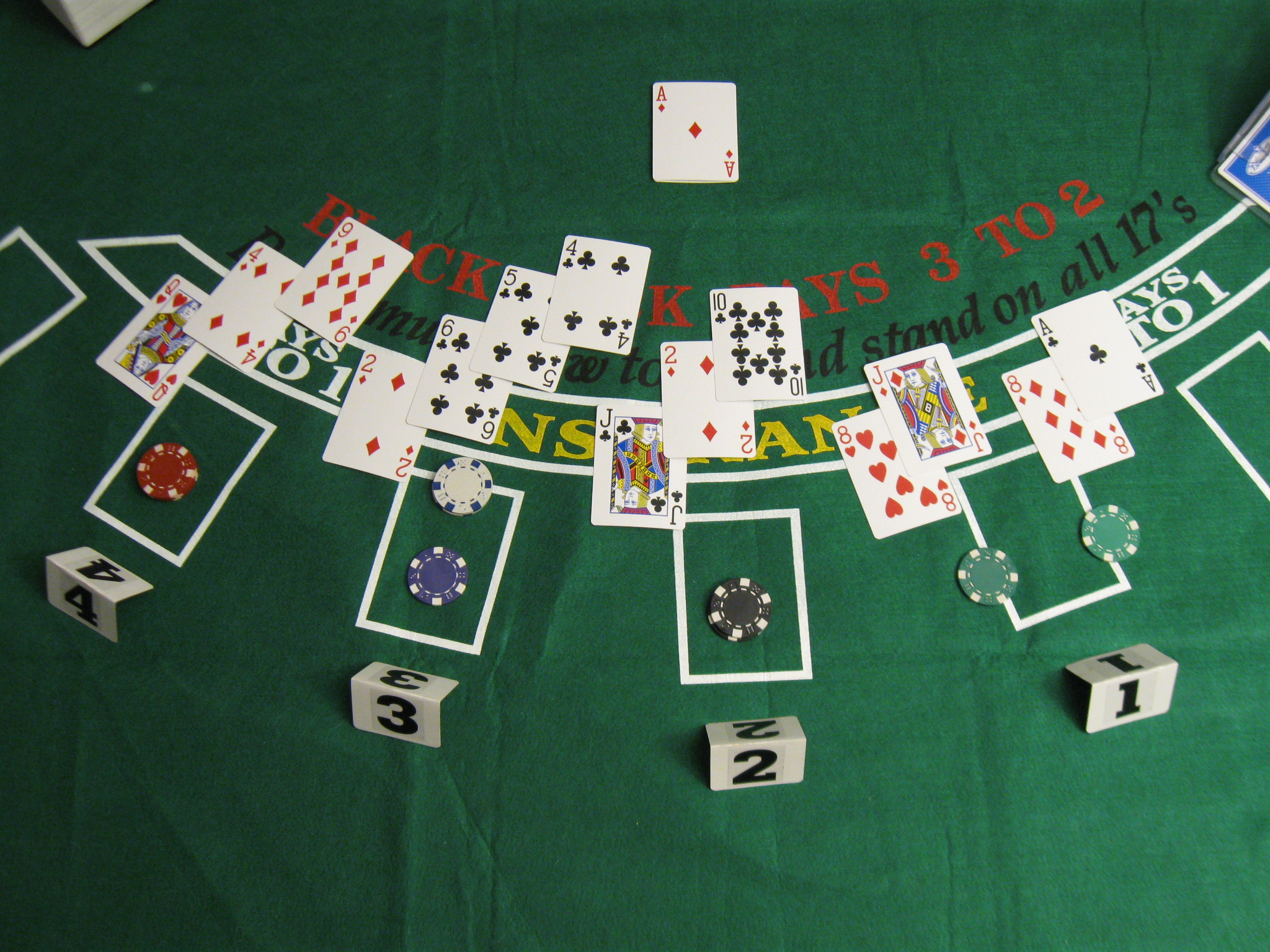
Player action

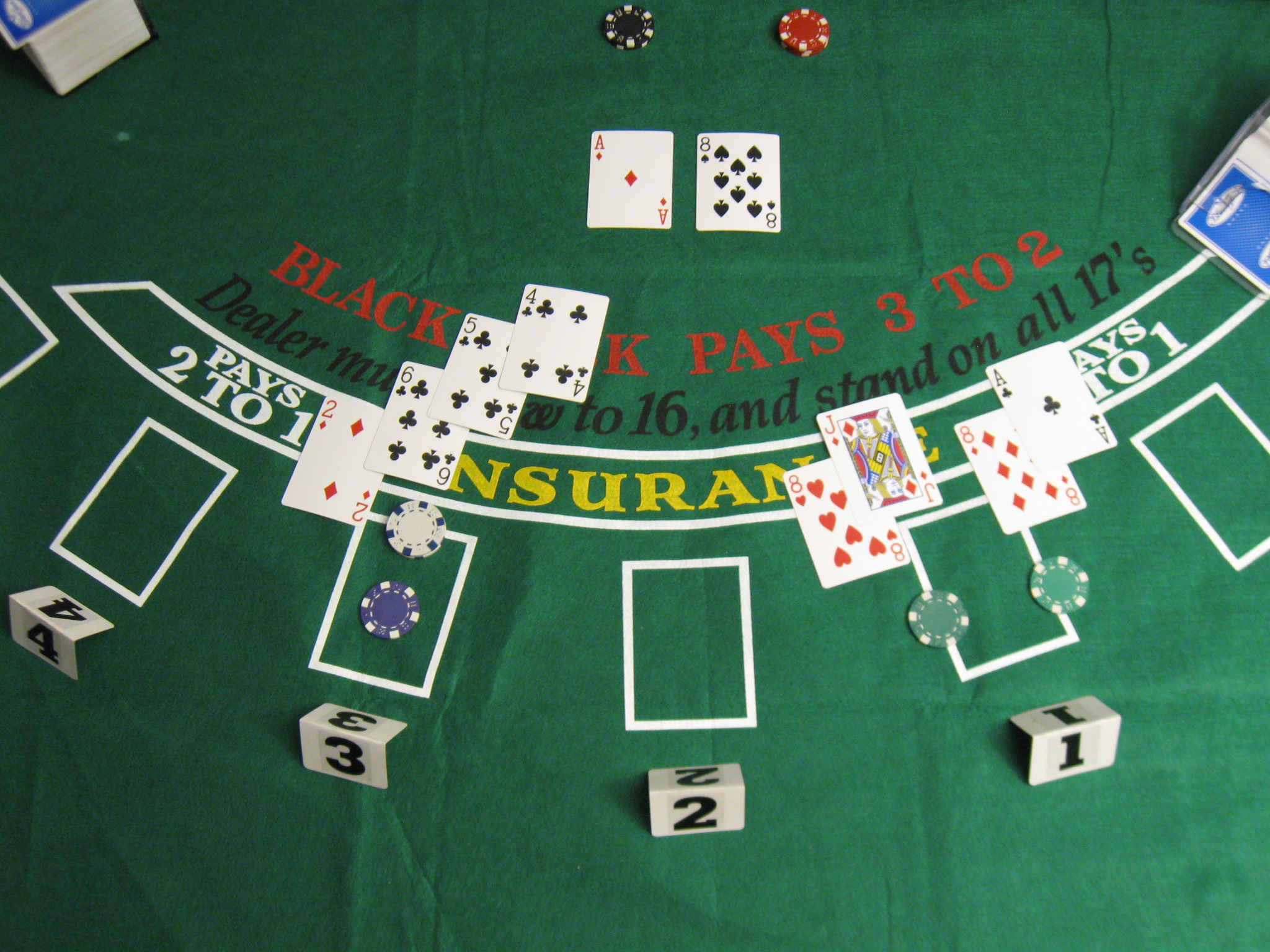
Dealer's hand revealed

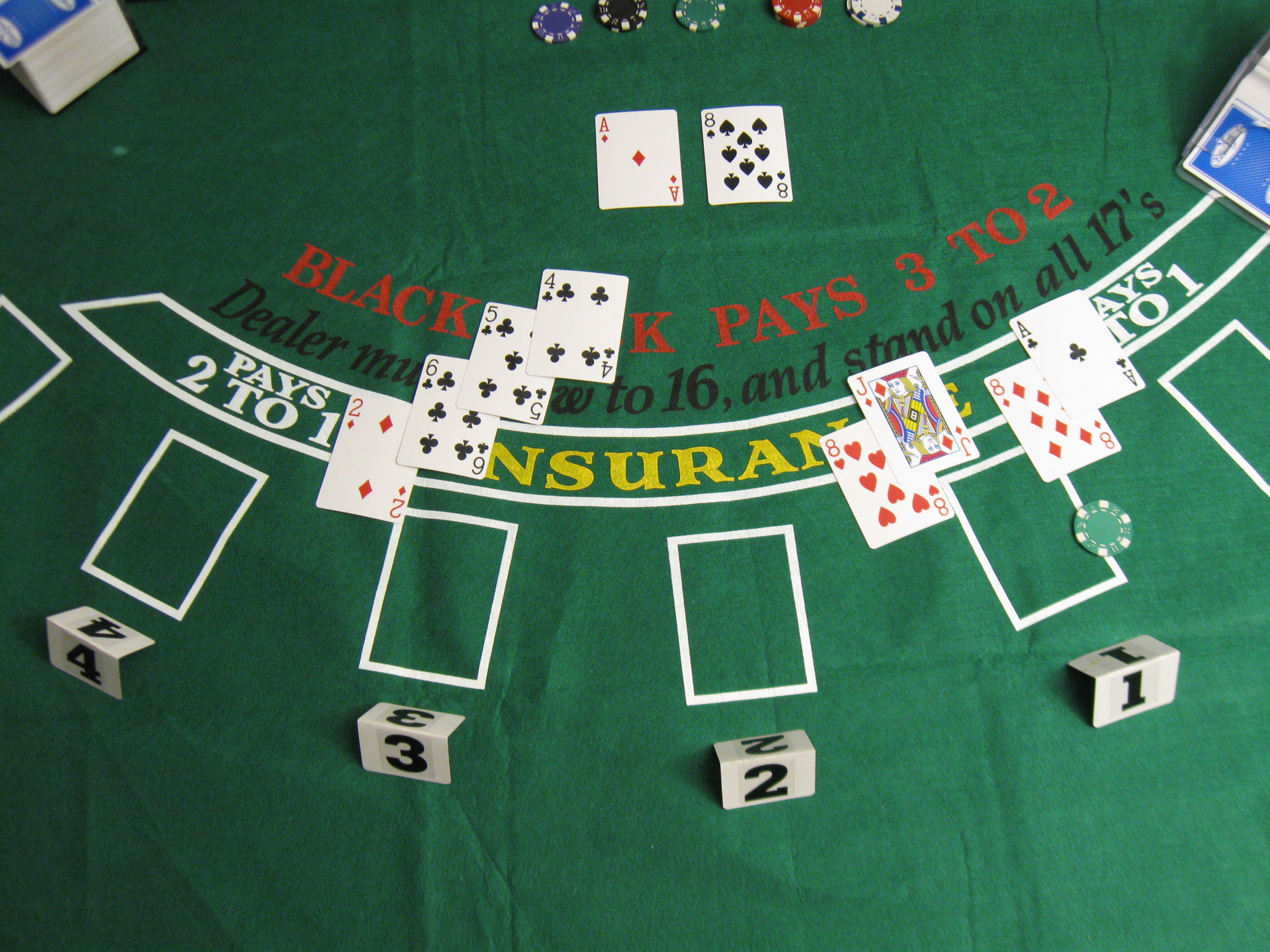
Bets settled

The object of the game is to win money by creating card totals higher than those of the dealer's hand but not exceeding 21, or by stopping at a total in the hope that the dealer will bust. Number cards count as their number, the jack, queen, and king ("face cards" or "pictures") count as 10, and aces count as either 1 or 11 depending on whether or not counting it as 11 would cause a bust. If a player exceeds 21 points, they bust and automatically lose. A total of 21 on the starting two cards is called a "blackjack" or "natural," and is the strongest hand.

At a blackjack table, the dealer faces five to nine playing positions from behind a semicircular table. Between one and eight standard 52-card decks are shuffled together. To start each round, players place bets in the "betting box" at each position. In jurisdictions allowing back betting, up to three players can be at each position. The player whose bet is at the front of the betting box controls the position, and the dealer consults the controlling player for playing decisions; the other bettors "play behind". A player can usually bet in one or multiple boxes at a single table, but in many U.S. casinos, players are limited to playing one to three positions at a table.

The dealer deals from their left ("first base") to their far right ("third base"). Each box gets an initial hand of two cards. The dealer's hand gets its first card face-up. In "hole card" games, the dealer also gets a second card face-down (the hole card), and if the first card is a 10-A, the dealer will peek at the hole card to see whether they have a blackjack. If they do, they reveal it immediately, the hand ends, and the dealer takes all wagers whose hands are not also a blackjack. Hole card games are sometimes played on tables with a small mirror or electronic sensor used to peek securely at the hole card. In European casinos, "no hole card" games are prevalent; the dealer's second card is not drawn until all the players have played their hands.

Dealers deal the cards from one or two handheld decks, from a dealer's shoe or from a shuffling machine. One card is dealt to each wagered-on position clockwise from the dealer's left, followed by one card to the dealer, followed by an additional card to each of the positions in play, followed by the dealer's hole card if applicable. The players' initial cards may be dealt face-up or face-down (more common in single and double-deck games).

Once all the hands are dealt, play begins with the player to the left of the dealer and proceeds clockwise.

=== Table layout and dealing equipment ===
Casino blackjack tables separate the player wagering positions from the dealer's working area. In New Jersey, an approved blackjack layout must contain designated wagering areas and display the applicable rules for blackjack payouts, dealer drawing procedures, and insurance payouts. Standard blackjack layouts may contain no more than seven wagering areas, while separate requirements apply to certain game variations.

The dealer's side of a regulated blackjack table may contain equipment such as a dealing shoe, discard rack, drop box, tip box, card reader, or approved shuffling machine. New Jersey regulations require a discard rack to be attached to the dealer's side of the table and specify that its capacity or markings correspond to the number of decks used in the game.

Requirements for dealing equipment vary by jurisdiction. Washington state requires house-banked card games to be dealt from a dealing shoe or an approved shuffling device, except that single-deck and double-deck games may be dealt by hand.

Some blackjack tables are fitted with an approved card reader that allows the dealer to determine whether the dealer's hole card completes a blackjack. Regulations may require the device to be inspected at the beginning of each gaming day to confirm that it has not been tampered with and is operating correctly.

Dealing shoes may also be subject to construction and placement requirements. New Jersey regulations specify features intended to permit inspection of the shoe, restrict access to cards below its base plate, and provide a marking for positioning the cutting card. The same regulations require dealing shoes and shuffling devices to be inspected before cards are placed in them at the beginning of the gaming day.

=== Player decisions ===
On the initial two cards, the player has up to five options: "hit", "stand", "double down", "split", or "surrender". Once a hand has more than two cards, hitting and standing are the only options available. Each option has a corresponding hand signal.

- Hit: Take another card.

Signal: Scrape cards against the table (in handheld games); tap the table with a finger or wave a hand toward the body (in games dealt face-up).

- Stand: Take no more cards; also known as "stand pat", "sit", "stick", or "stay".

Signal: Slide cards under chips face-down (in handheld games); wave hand horizontally (in games dealt face-up).

- Double down: Increase the initial bet by 100% and take exactly one more card. The additional bet is placed next to the original bet. Some games permit the player to increase the bet by amounts smaller than 100%, which is known as "double for less". Non-controlling players may or may not double their wager, but they still only take one card.

Signal: Place additional chips beside the original bet outside the betting box and point with one finger.

- Split: Create two hands from a starting hand where both cards are the same value. Each new hand gets a second card resulting in two starting hands. This requires an additional bet on the second hand. The two hands are played out independently, and the wager on each hand is won or lost independently. In the case of cards worth 10 points, some casinos only allow splitting when the cards rank the same. For example, 10-10 could be split, but K-10 could not. Doubling and re-splitting after splitting may be restricted. A 10-valued card and an ace resulting from a split usually isn't considered a blackjack. Hitting split aces is often not allowed. Non-controlling players can opt to put up a second bet or not. If they do not, they only get paid or lose on one of the two post-split hands.

Signal: Place additional chips next to the original bet outside the betting box and point with two fingers spread into a V formation.

- Surrender: Forfeit half the bet and end the hand immediately. This option is only available at some tables in some casinos, and is not allowed after splitting.

Signal: Using the index finger, draw a horizontal line behind the bet. Surrender can also be announced verbally.

In handheld games, a player must reveal their cards if they have a blackjack, bust, or wish to double down, split, or surrender.

Hand signals help the "eye in the sky" make a video recording of the table, which resolves disputes and identifies dealer mistakes. It is also used to protect the casino against dealers who steal chips or players who cheat. Recordings can also identify advantage players. When a player's hand signal disagrees with their words, the hand signal takes precedence.

After the players have finished playing, the dealer's hand is resolved by drawing cards until the hand achieves a total of 17 or higher. If the dealer has a total of 17 including an ace valued as 11 (a "soft 17"), some games require the dealer to stand while other games require the dealer to hit. The dealer never doubles, splits, or surrenders. If the dealer busts, all players who haven't bust win. If the dealer does not bust, each remaining bet wins if its hand is higher than the dealer's and loses if it is lower. In the case of a tie ("push" or "standoff"), bets are returned without adjustment. A blackjack beats any hand that is not a blackjack, even one with a value of 21.

A player blackjack wins immediately unless the dealer also has one, in which case the hand is a push. If the dealer is dealt blackjack, all players who do not have a blackjack lose.

Wins are paid out at even money, except for player blackjacks, which are traditionally paid out at 3 to 2 odds. Some tables today pay blackjacks at less than 3:2.

=== Insurance ===
If the dealer shows an ace, an "insurance" bet is allowed. Insurance is a side bet that the dealer has a blackjack. The dealer asks for insurance bets before the first player plays. Insurance bets of up to half the player's current bet are placed on the "insurance bar" above the player's cards. If the dealer has a blackjack, insurance pays 2 to 1. In most casinos, the dealer looks at the down card and pays off or takes the insurance bet immediately. In other casinos, the payoff waits until the end of the play.

In face-down games, if a player has more than one hand, they can look at all their hands before deciding. This is the only condition where a player can look at multiple hands.

Players with blackjack can also take insurance. When this happens, it is called 'even money,' as the player is giving up their 3:2 payout for a 1:1 payout when taking insurance with a blackjack, under the condition that they still get paid if the dealer also has a blackjack.

Insurance bets lose money in the long run. The dealer has a blackjack less than one-third of the time. In some games, players can also take insurance when a 10-valued card shows, but the dealer has an ace in the hole less than one-tenth of the time.

The insurance bet is susceptible to advantage play. It is advantageous to make an insurance bet whenever the hole card has more than a one in three chance of being a ten. Card counting techniques can identify such situations.

== Rule variations and effects on house edge ==
Note: Where changes in the house edge due to changes in the rules are stated in percentage terms, the difference is usually stated here in percentage points, not the percentage change. For example, if an edge of 10% is reduced to 9%, it is reduced by one percentage point, not reduced by ten percent.

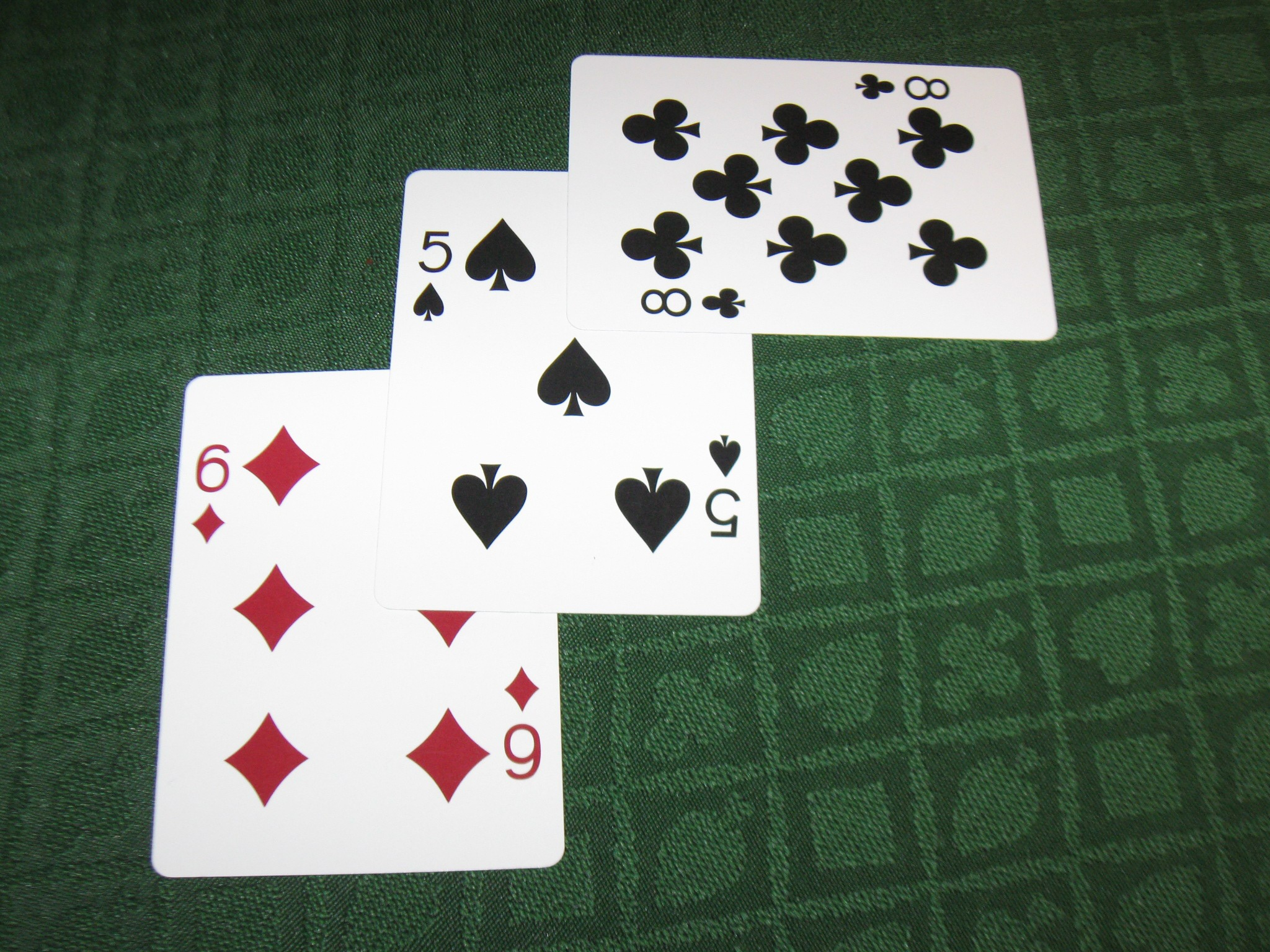
Doubling down. The third card is placed at right angles to signify that the player cannot receive any more cards.

Blackjack rules are generally set by regulations that establish permissible rule variations at the casino's discretion. Blackjack comes with a "house edge"; the casino's statistical advantage is built into the game. Most of the house's edge comes from the fact that the player loses when both the player and dealer bust. Blackjack players using basic strategy lose on average less than 1% of their action over the long run, giving blackjack one of the lowest edges in the casino. The house edge for games where blackjack pays 6 to 5 instead of 3 to 2 increases by about 1.4%. Player deviations from basic strategy also increase the house edge.

=== Dealer hits soft 17 ===
A "soft 17" in blackjack (an ace and any combination of 6)

Each game has a rule about whether the dealer must hit or stand on soft 17, which is generally printed on the table surface. The variation where the dealer must hit soft 17 is abbreviated "H17" in blackjack literature, with "S17" used for the stand-on-soft-17 variation. Substituting an "H17" rule with an "S17" rule in a game benefits the player, decreasing the house edge by about 0.2%.

=== Number of decks ===
All other things equal, using fewer decks decreases the house edge. This is due to a combination of an increased probability of blackjack (which generally pays 3:2 for the player), an increased probability of the dealer busting, and doubling down being more beneficial for the player in a game with fewer decks.

Casinos generally compensate by tightening other rules in games with fewer decks, to preserve the house edge or discourage play altogether. When offering single-deck blackjack games, casinos are more likely to disallow doubling on soft hands or after splitting, restrict resplitting, require higher minimum bets, or pay the player less than 3:2 for a winning blackjack.

The following table illustrates the mathematical effect on the house edge of the number of decks, by considering games with various deck counts under the following ruleset: double after split allowed, resplit to four hands allowed, no hitting split aces, no surrendering, double on any two cards, original bets only lost on dealer blackjack, dealer hits soft 17, and cut-card used. The increase in house edge per unit increase in the number of decks is most dramatic when comparing the single-deck game to the two-deck game, and becomes progressively smaller as more decks are added.

Number of decks	House advantage
Single deck	0.16%
Double deck	0.46%
Four decks	0.60%
Six decks	0.64%
Eight decks	0.66%

=== Late/early surrender ===
Surrender, for those games that allow it, is usually not permitted against a dealer blackjack; if the dealer's first card is an ace or ten, the hole card is checked to make sure there is no blackjack before surrender is offered. This rule protocol is consequently known as "late" surrender. The alternative, "early" surrender, gives the player the option to surrender before the dealer checks for blackjack, or in a no hole card game. Early surrender is much more favorable to the player than late surrender.

For late surrender, however, while it is tempting to opt for surrender on any hand which will probably lose, the correct strategy is to only surrender on the very worst hands, because having even a one-in-four chance of winning the full bet is better than losing half the bet and pushing the other half, as entailed by surrendering.

Resplitting

If the cards of a post-split hand have the same value, most games allow the player to split again, or "resplit". The player places a further wager, and the dealer separates the new pair dealing a further card to each as before. Some games allow unlimited resplitting, while others may limit it to a certain number of hands, such as four hands (for example, "resplit to 4").

Hit/resplit split aces

After splitting aces, the common rule is that only one card will be dealt to each ace; the player cannot split, double, or take another hit on either hand. Rule variants include allowing resplitting aces or allowing the player to hit split aces. Games allowing aces to be resplit are not uncommon, but those allowing the player to hit split aces are extremely rare. Allowing the player to hit hands resulting from split aces reduces the house edge by about 0.13%; allowing resplitting of aces reduces the house edge by about 0.03%. Note that a ten-value card dealt on a split ace (or vice versa) will not be counted as a blackjack but as a soft 21.

No double after split

After a split, most games allow doubling down on the new two-card hands. Disallowing doubling after a split increases the house edge by about 0.12%.

Double on 9/10/11 or 10/11 only

Under the "Reno rule", doubling down is only permitted on hard totals of 9, 10, or 11 (under a similar European rule, only 10 or 11). The basic strategy would otherwise call for some doubling down with hard 9 and soft 13–18, and advanced players can identify situations where doubling on soft 19–20 and hard 8, 7, and even 6 is advantageous. The Reno rule prevents the player from taking advantage of double-down in these situations and thereby increases the player's expected loss. The Reno rule increases the house edge by around 0.1%, and its European version by around 0.2%.

=== No hole card and OBO ===
In most non-U.S. casinos, a "no hole card" game is played, meaning that the dealer does not draw nor consult their second card until after all players have finished making decisions. With no hole card, it is rarely the correct basic strategy to double or split against a dealer ten or ace, since a dealer blackjack will result in the loss of the split and double bets; the only exception is with a pair of aces against a dealer 10, where it is still correct to split. In all other cases, a stand, hit, or surrender is called for. For instance, when holding 11 against a dealer 10, the correct strategy is to double in a hole card game (where the player knows the dealer's second card is not an ace), but to hit in a no-hole card game. The no-hole-card rule adds approximately 0.11% to the house edge.

The "original bets only" rule variation appearing in certain no hole card games states that if the player's hand loses to a dealer blackjack, only the mandatory initial bet ("original") is forfeited, and all optional bets, meaning doubles and splits, are pushed. "Original bets only" is also known by the acronym OBO; it has the same effect on basic strategy and the house edge as reverting to a hole card game.

=== Altered payout for a winning blackjack ===
In many casinos, a blackjack pays only 6:5 or even 1:1 instead of the usual 3:2. This is most common at tables with lower table minimums. Although this payoff was originally limited to single-deck games, it has spread to double-deck and shoe games. Among common rule variations in the U.S., these altered payouts for blackjack are the most damaging to the player, causing the greatest increase in house edge. Since blackjack occurs in approximately 4.8% of hands, the 1:1 game increases the house edge by 2.3%, while the 6:5 game adds 1.4% to the house edge. Video blackjack machines generally pay a 1:1 payout for a blackjack.

=== Dealer wins ties ===
The rule that bets on tied hands are lost rather than pushed is catastrophic to the player. Though rarely used in standard blackjack, it is sometimes seen in "blackjack-like" games, such as in some charity casinos.

== Blackjack strategy ==
=== Basic strategy ===
Each blackjack game has a basic strategy, the optimal method of playing any hand. When using basic strategy, the long-term house advantage (the expected loss of the player) is minimized.

An example of a basic strategy is shown in the table below, which applies to a game with the following specifications:

- Four to eight decks
- The dealer hits on a soft 17
- A double is allowed after a split
- Only original bets are lost on dealer blackjack

Player hand	Dealer's face-up card									
Player hand	2	3	4	5	6	7	8	9	10	A
Hard totals (excluding pairs)
18–21	S	S	S	S	S	S	S	S	S	S
17	S	S	S	S	S	S	S	S	S	Us
16	S	S	S	S	S	H	H	Uh	Uh	Uh
15	S	S	S	S	S	H	H	H	Uh	Uh
13–14	S	S	S	S	S	H	H	H	H	H
12	H	H	S	S	S	H	H	H	H	H
11	Dh	Dh	Dh	Dh	Dh	Dh	Dh	Dh	Dh	Dh
10	Dh	Dh	Dh	Dh	Dh	Dh	Dh	Dh	H	H
9	H	Dh	Dh	Dh	Dh	H	H	H	H	H
5–8	H	H	H	H	H	H	H	H	H	H
Soft totals
	2	3	4	5	6	7	8	9	10	A
A,9	S	S	S	S	S	S	S	S	S	S
A,8	S	S	S	S	Ds	S	S	S	S	S
A,7	Ds	Ds	Ds	Ds	Ds	S	S	H	H	H
A,6	H	Dh	Dh	Dh	Dh	H	H	H	H	H
A,4–A,5	H	H	Dh	Dh	Dh	H	H	H	H	H
A,2–A,3	H	H	H	Dh	Dh	H	H	H	H	H
A,A (Note: For the specific circumstance where the player has a pair of aces and is forbidden to split but permitted to hit.)	H	H	H	H	Dh	H	H	H	H	H
Pairs
	2	3	4	5	6	7	8	9	10	A
A, A	SP	SP	SP	SP	SP	SP	SP	SP	SP	SP
10,10	S	S	S	S	S	S	S	S	S	S
9,9	SP	SP	SP	SP	SP	S	SP	SP	S	S
8,8	SP	SP	SP	SP	SP	SP	SP	SP	SP	Usp
7,7	SP	SP	SP	SP	SP	SP	H	H	H	H
6,6	SP	SP	SP	SP	SP	H	H	H	H	H
5,5	Dh	Dh	Dh	Dh	Dh	Dh	Dh	Dh	H	H
4,4	H	H	H	SP	SP	H	H	H	H	H
2,2–3,3	SP	SP	SP	SP	SP	SP	H	H	H	H

Key:

S = Stand
H = Hit
Dh = Double (if not allowed, then hit)
Ds = Double (if not allowed, then stand)
SP = Split
Uh = Surrender (if not allowed, then hit)
Us = Surrender (if not allowed, then stand)
Usp = Surrender (if not allowed, then split)

Most basic strategy decisions are the same for all blackjack games. Rule variations call for changes in only a few situations. For example, to use the table above on a game with the stand-on-soft-17 rule (which favors the player, and is typically found only at higher-limit tables today) only 6 cells would need to be changed: hit on 11 vs. A, hit on 15 vs. A, stand on 17 vs. A, stand on A,7 vs. 2, stand on A,8 vs. 6, and split on 8,8 vs. A. Regardless of the specific rule variations, taking insurance or "even money" is never the correct play under a basic strategy.

Estimates of the house edge for blackjack games quoted by casinos and gaming regulators are based on the assumption that the players follow basic strategy.

Most blackjack games have a house edge of between 0.5% and 1%, placing blackjack among the cheapest casino table games for the player. Casino promotions such as complimentary matchplay vouchers or 2:1 blackjack payouts allow players to acquire an advantage without deviating from basic strategy.

=== Composition-dependent strategy ===
The basic strategy is based on a player's point total and the dealer's visible card. Players can sometimes improve on this decision by considering the composition of their hand, not just the point total. For example, players should ordinarily stand when holding 12 against a dealer 4. But in a single deck game, players should hit if their 12 consists of a 10 and a 2. The presence of a 10 in the player's hand has two consequences:

- It makes the player's 12 a worse hand to stand on (since the only way to avoid losing is for the dealer to go bust, which is less likely if there are fewer 10s left in the shoe).
- It makes hitting safer, since the only way of going bust is to draw a 10, and this is less likely with a 10 already in the hand.

Even when basic and composition-dependent strategies lead to different actions, the difference in expected reward is small, and it becomes smaller with more decks. Using a composition-dependent strategy rather than a basic strategy in a single-deck game reduces the house edge by 0.04%, which falls to 0.003% for a six-deck game.

=== Advantage play ===
Blackjack has been a high-profile target for advantage players since the 1960s. Advantage play attempts to win more using skills such as memory, computation, and observation. While these techniques are legal, they can give players a mathematical edge in the game, making advantage players unwanted customers for casinos. Advantage play can lead to ejection or blacklisting. Some advantageous play techniques in blackjack include:

==== Card counting ====
During the course of a blackjack shoe, the dealer exposes the dealt cards. Players can infer from their accounting of the exposed cards which cards remain. These inferences can be used in the following ways:

- Players can make larger bets when they have an advantage. For example, the players can increase the starting bet if many aces and tens are left in the deck, in the hope of hitting a blackjack.
- Players can deviate from basic strategy according to the composition of their undealt cards. For example, with many tens left in the deck, players might double down in more situations since there is a better chance of getting a good hand.

A card counting system assigns a point score to each card rank (e.g., 1 point for 2–6, 0 points for 7–9, and −1 point for 10–A). When a card is exposed, a counter adds the score of that card to a running total, the 'count'. A card counter uses this count to make betting and playing decisions. The count starts at 0 for a freshly shuffled deck for "balanced" counting systems. Unbalanced counts are often started at a value that depends on the number of decks used in the game.

Blackjack's house edge is usually around 0.5–1% when players use basic strategy. Card counting can give the player an edge of up to about 2%.

Card counting works best when a few cards remain. This makes single-deck games better for counters. As a result, casinos are more likely to insist that players do not reveal their cards to one another in single-deck games. In games with more decks, casinos limit penetration by ending the shoe and reshuffling when one or more decks remain undealt. Casinos also sometimes use a shuffling machine to reintroduce the cards whenever a deck has been played.

Card counting is legal, but a casino might inform counters that they are no longer welcome to play blackjack. Sometimes a casino might ban a card counter from the property. The use of external devices to assist in card counting is illegal in Nevada.

==== Shuffle tracking ====
Another advantage play technique, mainly applicable in multi-deck games, involves tracking groups of cards (also known as slugs, clumps, or packs) through the shuffle and then playing and betting according to when those cards come into play from a new shoe. Shuffle tracking requires excellent eyesight and powers of visual estimation but is harder to detect; shuffle trackers' actions are largely unrelated to the composition of the cards in the shoe.

Arnold Snyder's articles in Blackjack Forum magazine brought shuffle tracking to the general public. His book, The Shuffle Tracker's Cookbook, mathematically analyzed the player edge available from shuffle tracking based on the actual size of the tracked slug. Jerry L. Patterson also developed and published a shuffle-tracking method for tracking favorable clumps of cards and cutting them into play and tracking unfavorable clumps of cards and cutting them out of play.

==== Identifying concealed cards ====
The player can also gain an advantage by identifying cards from distinctive wear markings on their backs, or by hole carding (observing during the dealing process the front of a card dealt face-down). These methods are generally legal although their status in particular jurisdictions may vary.

== Side bets ==
Many blackjack tables offer side bets on various outcomes including:

- Player hand and dealer's up card total 19, 20, or 21 ("Lucky Lucky")
- Player initial hand is a pair ("Perfect pairs")
- Player initial hand is suited, and connected, or a suited K-Q ("Royal match")
- Player initial hand plus dealer's card makes a flush, straight, or three-of-a-kind poker hand ("21+3")
- Amount of sevens in player's initial hand and dealer's card ("Blazing 7s")
- Player initial hand totals 20 ("Lucky Ladies")
- Dealer upcard is in between the value of the player's two cards ("In Bet")
- First card drawn to the dealer will result in a dealer bust ("Bust It!")
- One or both of the player's cards is the same as the dealer's card ("Match the Dealer")

The side wager is typically placed in a designated area next to the box for the main wager. A player wishing to wager on a side bet usually must place a wager on blackjack. Some games require that the blackjack wager should equal or exceed any side bet wager. A non-controlling player of a blackjack hand is usually permitted to place a side bet regardless of whether the controlling player does so.

The house edge for side bets is generally higher than for the blackjack game itself. Nonetheless, side bets can be susceptible to card counting. A side count designed specifically for a particular side bet can improve the player's edge. Only a few side bets, like "Insurance" and "Lucky Ladies", correlate well with the high-low counting system and offer a sufficient win rate to justify the effort of advantage play.

In team play, it is common for team members to be dedicated to only counting a side bet using a specialized count.

== Video blackjack ==
A video blackjack machine at Seven Feathers Casino

Some casinos, as well as general betting outlets, provide blackjack among a selection of casino-style games at electronic consoles. Video blackjack game rules are generally more favorable to the house; e.g., paying out only even money for winning blackjacks. Video and online blackjack games generally deal each round from a fresh shoe (i.e., use an RNG for each deal), rendering card counting ineffective in most situations.

== Variants and related games ==
Blackjack is a member of the family of traditional card games played recreationally worldwide. Most of these games have not been adapted for casino play. Furthermore, the casino game development industry actively produces blackjack variants, most of which are ultimately not adopted by casinos. The following are the most prominent and established variants in casinos.

- Spanish 21 provides players with liberal rules, such as doubling down any number of cards (with the option to "rescue", or surrender only one wager to the house), payout bonuses for five or more card 21s, 6–7–8 21s, 7–7–7 21s, late surrender, and player blackjacks and player 21s always winning. The trade-off is having no 10s in the deck, although the jacks, queens, and kings are still there. An unlicensed version of Spanish 21 played without a hole card is found in Australian casinos under the name "pontoon".
- 21st-century blackjack (or Vegas-style blackjack) is found in California card rooms. In variations, a player bust does not always result in an automatic loss; depending on the casino, the player can still push if the dealer also busts. The dealer has to bust with a higher total, though.
- Double exposure blackjack deals the first two cards of the dealer's hand face up. Blackjacks pay even money, and players lose on ties. Also, players can neither buy insurance nor surrender.
- Double attack blackjack has liberal blackjack rules and the option of increasing one's wager after seeing the dealer's up card. This game is dealt from a Spanish shoe, and blackjacks only pay even money.
- Blackjack switch is played over two hands, and the second card can be switched between hands. For example, if the player is dealt 10–6 and 5–10, then the player can switch two cards to make hands of 10–10 and 6–5. Natural blackjacks are paid 1:1 instead of the standard 3:2, and a dealer 22 is a push.
- Super Fun 21 allows a player to split a hand up to four times. If the player has six cards totaling 20, they automatically win. Wins are paid 1:1.
- In New Years 31, the card limit is 31 instead of 21, with 14 beating 30. Additionally, the players have to bet on themselves and if they want to bet on other players depending on the starting card. Then, the only player action per round after that is either a hit or pass. Passing results in the dealer continuing to the next player.

Examples of local traditional and recreational related games include French vingt-et-un ('twenty-one') and German Siebzehn und Vier ('seventeen and four'). Neither game allows splitting. An ace counts only eleven, but two aces count as a blackjack. It is mostly played in private circles and barracks. The popular British member of the vingt-un family is called "pontoon", the name being probably a corruption of vingt-et-un.

== Blackjack Hall of Fame ==
In 2002, professional gamblers worldwide were invited to nominate great blackjack players for admission into the Blackjack Hall of Fame. Seven members were inducted in 2002, with new people inducted every year after. The Hall of Fame is at the Barona Casino in San Diego. Members include Edward O. Thorp, author of the 1960s book Beat the Dealer; Ken Uston, who popularized the concept of team play; Arnold Snyder, author and editor of the Blackjack Forum trade journal; and Stanford Wong, author and popularizer of "Wonging".
