= Frederic Apcar =

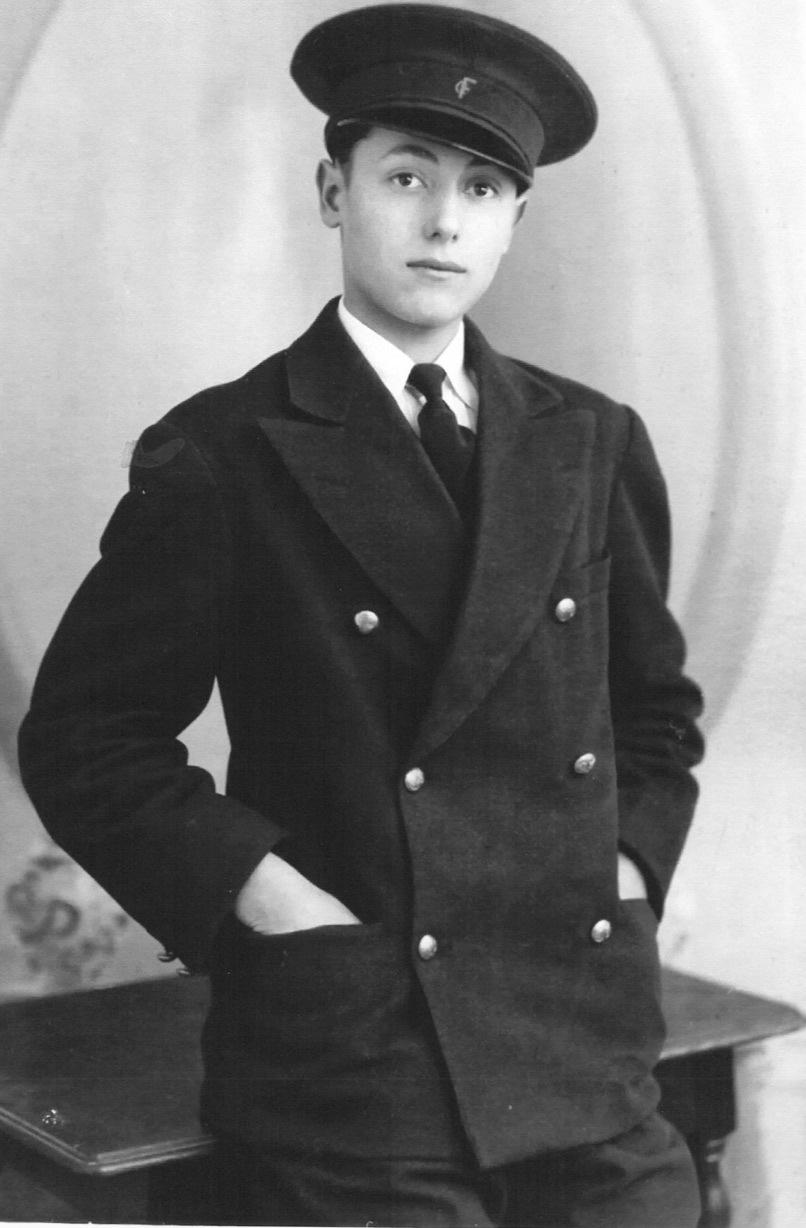
A young Frederic Apcar.

Frederic Apcar (born Frédéric Stefan Apcar; September 16, 1914 – August 2, 2008) was a Russian-born French acrobatic dancer and producer/impresario best known for his pioneering "Vive Les Girls" and long-running "Casino de Paris" shows at the Dunes. These Parisian-inspired productions offered a colorful variety of acts featuring singers, dancers, magicians, comedians, acrobats, animal trainers and more.

== Biography ==
Frederic Apcar was born September 16, 1914, in the French Embassy in Russia (today known as Tiflis, Georgia) of Parisian parents and later raised in Paris, France. Apcar first took interest in theater performance after watching the well-known opera, "Le Spectre de la rose" at the young age of 10. Between the ages of 12 and 16, Apcar tried his hand at several professions, working as a market laborer, coal stoker, bookkeeper, printer's devil, waiter and dock boy. Displeased with his last position, he turned his interest back to theater.

After working briefly as an usher in the Rex Theater in Paris, Apcar then went on to study classical, modern, and tap dancing. At the age of 16, Apcar became a professional dancer, performing first as a chorus boy at the Folies Bergère. Apcar quickly became principal dancer in Folies Bergère after demonstrating his talent and formed his own act, Florence and Frederic, just four years later. Together at Bal Tabarin (Paris), Florence Waren and Frederic Apcar became one of the most renowned ballroom dance teams in Europe, occasionally performing with Édith Piaf and Maurice Chevalier. In 1955, the adagio act expanded to a 14-member ensemble known as The Florence and Frederic Ballet, later making its American debut on Ed Sullivan's variety show. In 1959, producer Lou Walters brought Apcar and his troupe to the Tropicana to join the U.S. Edition of the Folies Bergère.

A fan of his work, Dunes owner Major Riddle tested Apcar's production abilities before offering him the Dunes' main showroom. It was in 1961 when Apcar conceived and produced in entirety, his very first musical revue, "Vive Les Girls." After proving wild success with it, Apcar launched "Casino de Paris" in December 1963, in a brand new theater built by Dunes management expressly for the new French spectacular. "Casino de Paris" ran for two decades at Dunes hotel, at first headlined by legendary French singer Line Renaud. In 1966 Apcar hired Violetta Villas as a second star. Villas was Polish singer with a voice with a range of four octaves and Apcar saw her during her performances at Olympia in Paris in 1965.

Beyond "Vive Les Girls!" and "Casino de Paris," Apcar went on to produce other hit shows in Las Vegas, including “Bare Touch of Las Vegas,” “Hot Streak,” “Showbiz” and many more. Apcar continued to conceive, produce and direct shows throughout the United States until his retirement in 1993. He maintained Las Vegas as his home base until his death. In 2006, Apcar received a lifetime achievement award from the Nevada Entertainer/Artist Hall of Fame at University of Nevada, Las Vegas. Apcar died on August 2, 2008, at the age of 93.

Frederic Apcar is survived by his wife Olga, daughter Elisabeth, and son Frederic Apcar II, who carries his father's legacy producing shows in Las Vegas and Reno, Nevada.
