= Dunes (hotel and casino) =

Historic casino hotel in Las Vegas, Nevada

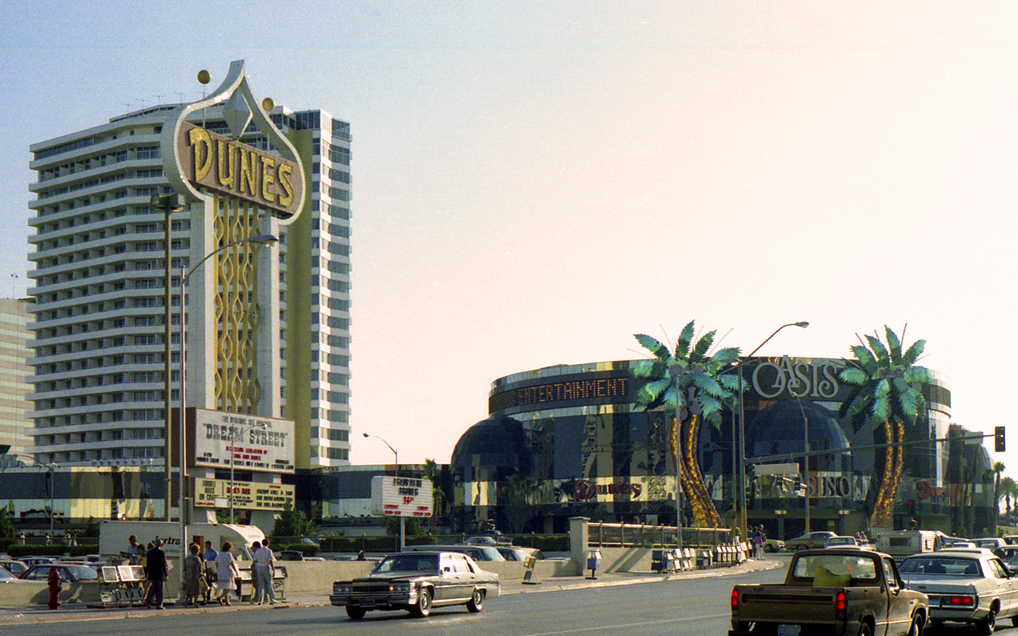
- The Dunes and Oasis Casino in 1983, 10 years before their demolition, seen from Flamingo Road

- Location within Las Vegas Strip Location within Nevada Location within the United States
- Interactive map of Dunes
- Location: Paradise, Nevada; 3650 Las Vegas Boulevard South; 36°06′47″N 115°10′35″W
- Opened: May 23, 1955
- Closed: January 26, 1993; 33 years ago
- Theme: Arabian
- No. of rooms: 194 (as of 1955); 960 (1965); 1,282 (1979)
- Permanent shows: Minsky's Follies; Vive Les Girls; Casino de Paris
- Signature attractions: Emerald Green golf course
- Notable restaurants: Sultan's Table; Dome of the Sea; Top O' the Strip
- Casino type: Land-based
- Owner: Masao Nangaku (1987–1992); Mirage Resorts (1992–1994)
- Architect: John Replogle and Robert Dorr Jr. (1955); Milton Schwartz (1964–65 additions); Maxwell Starkman (1979 hotel addition)
- Renovated in: 1960–61, 1964–65, 1971, 1978–79, 1982, 1986

The Dunes (Note: Also known as the Dunes Hotel or Dunes Hotel and Country Club.) was a hotel and casino on the Las Vegas Strip in Paradise, Nevada. It opened on May 23, 1955, as the tenth resort on the Strip. It was initially owned by a group of businessmen from out of state, but failed to prosper under their management. It also opened during a period of declining tourism, coinciding with an overabundance of hotel rooms on the Strip. A few months after the opening, management was taken over by the operators of the Sands resort, also on the Strip. This group failed to improve business and relinquished control less than six months later.

Businessman Major Riddle turned business around after taking over operations in 1956. He was involved with the resort until his death in 1980. He had several partners, including Sid Wyman, who worked for the Dunes from 1961 until his death in 1978. Mafia attorney Morris Shenker joined in 1975, following one of the most extensive routine investigations ever conducted by the Nevada Gaming Control Board. The Dunes had frequent connections with Mafia figures, some of whom were alleged to have hidden ownership in the resort, and state officials were concerned about Shenker's association with such figures.

In 1957, the Dunes debuted Las Vegas' first topless show, Minsky Goes to Paris, prompting other resorts to follow suit. Two other successful shows, by Frederic Apcar, would later debut at the Dunes. The resort also offered amenities such as the Emerald Green golf course, which opened in 1964. The Dunes was one of two Strip resorts to include a golf course, the other one being the Desert Inn. The Emerald Green was the longest course in Nevada, at 7,240 yards.

The Dunes opened with 194 rooms, while a 21-story tower brought the total to 960. The tower was among the tallest buildings in Nevada, and was opened in 1965. By this time, the resort also had the tallest free-standing sign in the world, rising 181 feet (55 m). Several popular restaurants were also added in the 1960s, including the underwater-themed Dome of the Sea, and the Top O' the Strip, located at the top of the hotel tower. Another tower, 17 stories in height, was opened in 1979, giving the resort a total of 1,282 rooms. The Dunes added a second gaming facility, the Oasis Casino, in 1982.

The Dunes experienced financial problems in the 1980s, and had many prospective buyers during this time, including businessman Steve Wynn. Japanese investor Masao Nangaku eventually bought the resort in 1987, at a cost of $157 million. Nangaku intended to renovate and expand the Dunes, although his plans were derailed by an unusually lengthy control board investigation, which dissuaded financiers. Wynn's company, Mirage Resorts, bought the Dunes in November 1992, paying $75 million. Plans were announced to replace it with a lake resort.

The Dunes closed on January 26, 1993. The original North Tower was imploded on October 27, 1993, during a highly publicized ceremony which helped promote Wynn's new Treasure Island resort, located about a mile north. The demolition event garnered 200,000 spectators. The newer South Tower was imploded on July 20, 1994, without the fanfare of the first implosion; it attracted 3,000 spectators. Wynn's new resort, Bellagio, eventually opened on the former Dunes site in 1998.

== History ==
The Dunes was initially owned by a group of businessmen that included Robert Rice of Beverly Hills, James A. Sullivan of Rhode Island, Milton Gettinger of New York, and Alfred Gottesman, a wealthy theater operator in Florida. Rice and Gottesman were new to the gaming industry. The group proposed the project, originally called the Araby, in July 1953. It was later renamed the Vegas Plaza, and then Hotel Deauville. Groundbreaking took place on June 22, 1954, with the resort now known as the Dunes. It was built by the Los Angeles-based McNeil Construction Company, which spent 11 months working on the resort.

The Dunes opened on May 23, 1955, as the tenth resort on the Las Vegas Strip. The opening attracted many celebrities, including Cesar Romero, Spike Jones, and Rita Moreno. Gottesman and Sullivan were majority stockholders, and also served as 50-50 partners in the operation of the casino. Businessman Kirk Kerkorian bought a three-percent interest a couple months after the opening, marking his first Las Vegas investment.

The Dunes was one of four new Las Vegas resorts to open within a six-week period, resulting in financial trouble for each of them. The Las Vegas Valley had been overbuilt with hotel rooms during a time of lessened demand, and the Dunes was also the southernmost resort on the Strip, located a considerable distance from other properties. A Dunes attorney blamed the resort's financial trouble on a persistent losing streak in its casino. Rice believed that the financial problems were the result of it competing with other resorts for expensive live entertainment. In addition, the Dunes had numerous creditors. Among these was McNeil Construction, which filed a $166,000 lien against the ownership group, representing unpaid salary. The group said it would not pay the balance, stating that the construction contract had been violated.

In August 1955, an agreement was reached for Sands Hotel Corporation, owner of the Sands Hotel and Casino, to lease and operate the struggling Dunes. To mark the management change, a three-day celebration was held starting on September 9, 1955. Singer Frank Sinatra headlined the ceremony and entered on a camel. Sands closed the casino portion in January 1956, due to falling profits. It was the third Las Vegas casino to close in recent months, following the Moulin Rouge Hotel and Royal Nevada. Live entertainment also ceased, although the hotel remained open. Rice blamed disagreements within Sands for the casino's failure. The group lost $1.2 million operating the Dunes, and relinquished control of the resort on February 1, 1956.

Businessman Major Riddle subsequently partnered with local hotel operator William Miller to reopen the casino. They would be equal partners with 44-percent ownership, while Rice would own the remainder. The Dunes casino reopened in June 1956. Seven months later, plans were announced for Sullivan and Gottesman to sell the property to Jacob Gottlieb, owner of a Chicago trucking firm. Gottlieb became the resort's landlord through Western Realty Company, and Miller departed the property as president and general manager. The resort was managed through Riddle's operating company, M&R Investment. The Dunes was sold in a Clark County sheriff's auction at the end of 1957, to satisfy the debt owed to McNeil Construction. It sold for $115,000, but was valued at $3.5 million. Gottesman, Sullivan, and Gettinger bought it back in November 1958.

The resort thrived under Riddle, who added several new shows and facilities. On April 15, 1959, the Dunes hosted the first double groundbreaking ceremony in Las Vegas history: one for a convention center, built south of the existing resort facilities, and another for a 500-space parking lot directly north of the resort. In 1961, St. Louis businessmen Sid Wyman, Charlie Rich, and George Duckworth invested in the Dunes and became the new operators through a lease agreement. Wyman was put in charge of casino operations, and Riddle remained as the majority owner. The following year, he sold 15 percent of the operating corporation to the three men, reducing his interest to 37 percent.

Several notable individuals were married at the Dunes, including Mary Tyler Moore and Grant Tinker (1962), Cary Grant and Dyan Cannon (1965), and Jane Fonda and Roger Vadim (1965). Mike Goodman, author of the best-selling 1963 book How to Win: At Cards, Dice, Races, Roulette, was a pit boss at the Dunes during the 1960s. Gambling author Barney Vinson also worked there.

During the 1960s, the resort's western edge was condemned for construction of Interstate 15. The resort added a golf course in 1964. A 21-story hotel tower, initially known as the Diamond of the Dunes, was opened in May 1965, to mark the resort's 10th anniversary. It was part of a $20 million expansion project, and later became the North Tower, following the addition of another hotel building to the south.

In 1969, M&R merged with Continental Connector Corporation, a New York-based electronics firm. M&R became a subsidiary of Continental Connector, which owned the Dunes and the land beneath it. Later in 1969, the U.S. Securities and Exchange Commission filed suit against Continental Connector, accusing it of making inaccurate financial statements regarding earnings at the Dunes. The company subsequently sought a buyer for the resort. In 1970, businessman Howard Hughes was in discussions to purchase the Dunes, although negotiations ended without a deal. Rapid-American Corporation began discussions to acquire the resort, but eventually dropped out.

Rice, Wyman, Duckworth and three other top resort officials were indicted in 1971 by a federal grand jury, alleging that they filed false corporate income tax returns and that they conspired to skim money from the gaming tables. The officials pleaded innocent, and Wyman later divested his ownership, but remained with the Dunes as a consultant.

=== Mafia connections ===
The Dunes had numerous Mafia connections for much of its history. Sullivan's early ownership in the resort was actually held by Raymond Patriarca, and Gottlieb was affiliated with Jimmy Hoffa, president of the Teamsters Union. During the 1950s and 1960s, the union financed many casino expansions in Las Vegas through its pension fund. This included a $5 million loan for the Dunes' original hotel tower. Allen Dorfman, who handled negotiations on behalf of the pension fund, was alleged to have hidden ownership in the Dunes. The Dunes occasionally provided first-class treatment to Mafia figures such as Anthony Giordano, who was arrested at the resort in 1969, while visiting Wyman. The FBI planted surveillance bugs at the Dunes during the 1960s, and certain resort employees worked as informants for the agency during the 1970s.

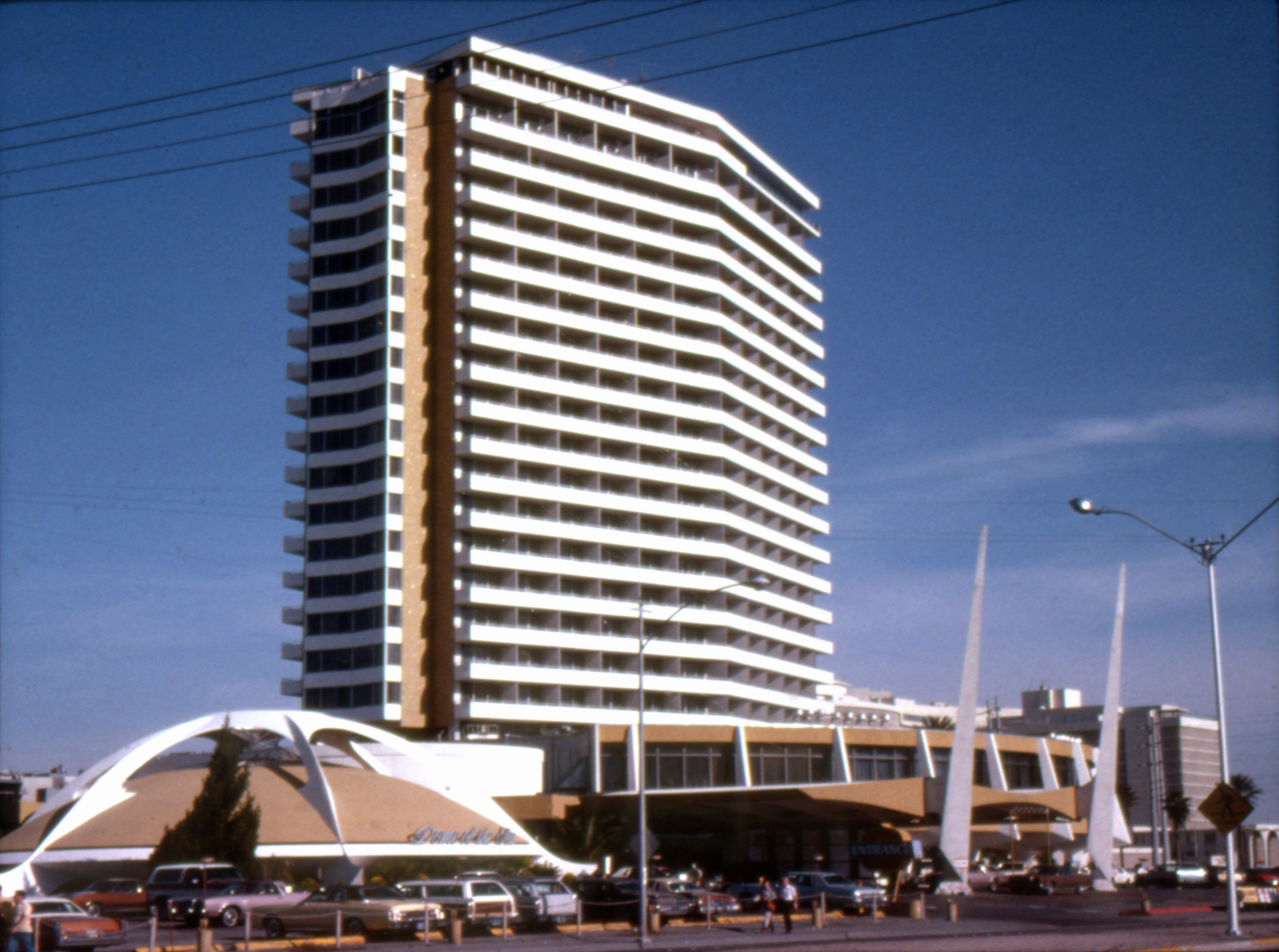
The Dunes in 1978

In 1972, a new group emerged as a prospective buyer for the resort, still under the ownership of Continental Connector. The group included San Diego developer Irvin Kahn and partner Morris Shenker, a St. Louis attorney who was representing Wyman and other resort officials in their case. The Nevada Gaming Control Board launched a routine investigation into Shenker and Kahn's financing, but halted its probe in 1973, following Kahn's death. In 1974, Shenker owned 37 percent of the Dunes through stock holdings in Continental Connector, and he sought to buy out the remainder, prompting the control board to reopen and expand its investigation into his financial background. It was one of the most extensive investigations in Nevada gaming history, as state officials had concerns about Mafia figures with whom Shenker was associated. Shenker later denied allegations that his ownership in the resort was a front for Nick Civella, whom Shenker had represented previously as attorney. Civella had a comped visit at the resort in 1974, but Shenker noted that he had not yet taken control of the Dunes at that time, and said he would not have allowed Civella to stay there if he had been in charge.

In 1975, Tony "The Ant" Spilotro began spending extensive time in the Dunes casino, where he would take phone calls routed to the poker room. The gaming control board accused him of treating the Dunes as his personal office, and questioned Shenker and Riddle as to why he was allowed on the premises, given his Black Book status. The men denied knowing Spilotro or his background, and said they only had an outdated photograph of him from 20 years earlier, making it difficult to identify him. The control board alleged that management was, in fact, aware of Spilotro and had already been warned about his presence at the resort.

M&R had negotiated a $40 million loan from the Teamsters Union pension fund in 1974. A $75 million expansion was planned to begin in 1976, and would include two additional hotel towers. The project would be financed in part by the Teamsters loan. However, the union withheld the funds, citing the Employee Retirement Income Security Act of 1974. Specifically, the union stated that the loan could not be granted because Continental Connector owned a trucking company which employed teamsters who had contributed to the pension fund. Shenker criticized the pension fund's reasoning, saying that Continental Connector had already divested itself of ownership in the trucking company. A second tower, rising 17 stories, eventually opened in 1979.

In 1980, members of the Colombo crime family received comped stays at the resort.

=== Later years ===
Wyman died of cancer in June 1978, and gaming at the Dunes was halted for two minutes in his honor. In 1979, Continental Connector was renamed Dunes Hotels and Casinos Inc., amid plans for a second Dunes resort in Atlantic City. Riddle died in 1980, and Shenker suffered a heart attack that year, prompting him to seriously consider selling the Dunes. In 1982, the resort added a second casino building, known as the Oasis Casino.

In December 1982, it was announced that the resort would be sold to brothers Stuart and Clifford Perlman for $185 million, which would include the assumption of $105 million in debt. The Perlmans provided a $10 million loan to prevent the Dunes from being seized by the Internal Revenue Service, but later backed out of the purchase after learning that the debt would be $20 million more than initially expected. Circus Circus Enterprises subsequently considered a purchase, as did Golden Nugget chairman Steve Wynn, who made a $115 million offer.

In May 1984, the Dunes was sold to John Anderson, a farmer in Davis, California, who also owned the Maxim hotel-casino in Las Vegas. Shenker maintained a 26-percent stake. M&R filed for Chapter 11 bankruptcy in November 1985. Later that month, Wynn made another $115 million offer, which was rejected by Anderson and Shenker, deeming it too low and valuing the Dunes at $143.5 million. Numerous other offers would be made over the next two years, including one by New York businessman Donald Trump. Blumenfeld Properties, a Philadelphia real estate development company, made a $145.5 million offer for the Dunes, but ultimately did not purchase the resort. Burton Cohen was named as the resort's president in January 1986, following the departure of its previous president.

Financial firm EF Hutton eventually formed a partnership that was interested in purchasing the Dunes, while a separate group led by Kerkorian was also in discussions. Talks with the two prospective buyers ended in February 1987, without a deal. Shortly thereafter, Texas-based lender Southmark Corporation purchased the first and second mortgages of the Dunes from Valley Bank and First Security Leasing, the Dunes' two major creditors. Later in 1987, Hilton Hotels and Japanese investor Masao Nangaku both considered buying the Dunes. Foreclosure was delayed to allow more time for a possible purchase. Hilton offered $122.5 million, and planned to refurbish the existing rooms while adding a third tower, at an additional cost of $110 million. Cohen believed that the resort needed 2,000 hotel rooms to adequately compete with other resorts. Kerkorian re-emerged as a prospective buyer, and Sheldon Adelson also considered purchasing the 163-acre resort. Nangaku ultimately prevailed, offering a $157.7 million bid in August 1987. His purchase was finalized four months later.

While Nangaku waited to receive a gaming license, he hired Dennis Gomes to operate the Dunes, replacing Cohen as president. Nangaku underwent an unusually long gaming control board probe. Investigators suspected that unlicensed people from Nangaku's company, Minami Group, were involved in the resort. The control board encountered difficulty when looking into Nangaku's business associates because of differences in how Japan handles documents, which are generally kept confidential. Investigators also suspected that the associates were making attempts to hinder their efforts.

In December 1988, Nangaku received a limited two-year gaming license while investigators continued their probe. Nangaku planned up to $280 million in renovations, including a new hotel tower and the demolition of the original motel-style structures, although little work had been done by mid-1989. He blamed the limited gaming license, stating that financiers were hesitant to lend money because of uncertainty about whether he would remain licensed in the near future.

The first phase of Nangaku's multimillion renovation eventually began in September 1989. The following year, Nangaku announced a planned $200 million remodeling project. He also hired the architectural firm Hellmuth, Obata & Kassabaum to design the new high-rise tower. Nangaku eventually received a permanent gaming license in May 1991, at which point he was seeking a partner to help renovate and operate the Dunes. The resort had laid off hundreds of workers that year, due to financial troubles brought on by the early 1990s recession. Despite Nangaku's expansion plans for the resort, he ultimately invested only $12 million in basic repairs.

The Las Vegas Review-Journal had written in 1988 that the Dunes had lost its "mystical luster" over the past 20 years, with its high rollers migrating to "more attractive" resorts. The newspaper's John L. Smith wrote that the Dunes had lost its "classy resort" reputation and had become "a dump by Strip standards" despite its name recognition and prime location on the central Strip. The Dunes failed to stay competitive against new megaresorts opening on the Strip, including The Mirage in 1989, and the Excalibur a year later. During 1990, the resort was losing $500,000 monthly.

Wynn's company, since renamed as Mirage Resorts, agreed to purchase the Dunes in October 1992. It was sold the following month for $75 million. At the time, the property was losing $2 million a month. Wynn planned to demolish the Dunes and redevelop the site. Gaming executive Richard Goeglein led a team which helped operate the Dunes in the months leading up to its closure.

=== Closure and demolition ===
The Dunes closed on January 26, 1993. Wynn said: "It's becoming in death a much better place than it was in life. This thing about melancholy in its passing is sorta strange. No one felt that while it [the Dunes] was laying there, terminally ill. It's been laying there on life support systems for many years". At the time of its closing, the Dunes employed more than 1,200 people. Employees held reunions each year following the closure. An on-site sale of the Dunes inventory, including light fixtures and carpeting, began in March 1993.

Demolition started on September 16, 1993. A four-alarm fire began on-site that afternoon, after workers accidentally ran over an electrical outlet in a bulldozer. The fire affected a two-story hotel building and eventually spread across the property. More than 200 firefighters responded, and six blocks of the Strip were closed off for more than four hours until the fire was contained.

The original North Tower was demolished on the night of October 27, 1993, one day after the opening of Wynn's new Strip resort Treasure Island, located about a mile north. The tower was imploded with great fanfare in an event emceed by Wynn that incorporated his new resort; on his command, a faux pirate ship at Treasure Island shot its cannon several times, simulating the Dunes' destruction by cannonballs as the implosion began. The tower was brought down around 10:10 p.m., following a six-minute fireworks show. The $1.5 million demolition event attracted 200,000 spectators. The Dunes was the first Las Vegas resort to be imploded, and numerous others would follow suit into the next decade.

The tower's implosion was handled by Controlled Demolition, Inc. The demolition required 365 pounds of dynamite, and 550 gallons of aviation fuel were also used, creating fireballs that went up each floor of the tower's east side engulfing the tower in flames, facing the Strip and spectators. The Oasis Casino and the Dunes' two-story casino building were not part of the implosion. Fireworks sparked two small fires on the roof of the Oasis, and numerous small fires began in the Dunes' casino area, all put out by on-site firefighters. Both facilities were bulldozed following the implosion. A three-month clean-up project began to remove the debris left from the imploded tower. During the clean-up, workers discovered hundreds of $100 Dunes casino chips in the resort's foundation; some casinos executives would dispose of outdated chips by burying them in the foundation of their buildings.

The South Tower was briefly used as a job center for Treasure Island. It was eventually imploded on the morning of July 20, 1994, without the fanfare of the first implosion. Mirage Resorts had urged people not to show up for the second implosion, which attracted approximately 3,000 spectators.

Commenting on the end of the Dunes, Wynn said, "This is not an execution; this is a phoenix rising". His new resort, Bellagio, eventually opened on the former Dunes site in 1998. The resort's lake covers much of the land once occupied by the Dunes' casino and hotel structures.

== Fire safety and 1986 arson spree ==
New fire-safety rules were implemented in Las Vegas following the MGM Grand fire (1980) and Las Vegas Hilton fire (1981). In 1985, the Dunes was one of seven hotels that failed to comply with the new safety rules, receiving six citations. The Dunes agreed to close its main showroom and convention center in exchange for a county extension, allowing time to raise $13.5 million needed to bring the facilities up to standard. In February 1986, the Dunes won additional extensions to meet the fire-safety requirements.

Later that month, a series of arson fires were set to several Strip resorts, including the Dunes, the Holiday Casino, and the Sands. As a precaution, 1,650 hotel guests were evacuated from the Dunes just before midnight. On the casino floor, many gamblers refused to leave and continued playing. Firefighters quickly determined that the fires posed no threat to the casino area. Crews battled a total of five fires at the Dunes, and guests were allowed to return to their rooms after three hours. Six people were treated for smoke inhalation, and damage was estimated at $55,000. The Dunes offered a $10,000 reward for information leading to the arrest of the arsonist. A man was eventually arrested for the arson spree and sentenced to 10 years in prison. In light of the recent fires, the county reconsidered the extensions previously granted to the Dunes. By May 1986, the resort had made significant progress on its fire retrofit work.

== Features ==
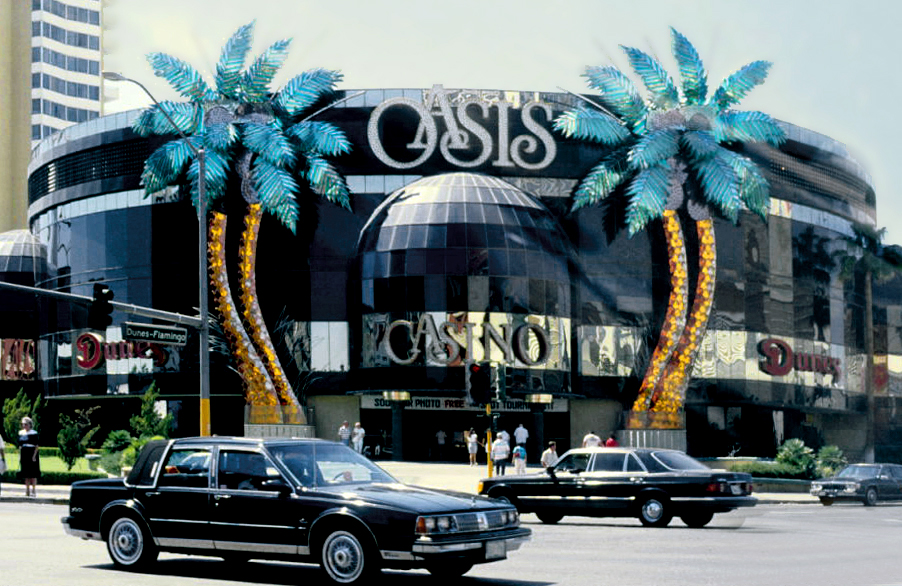
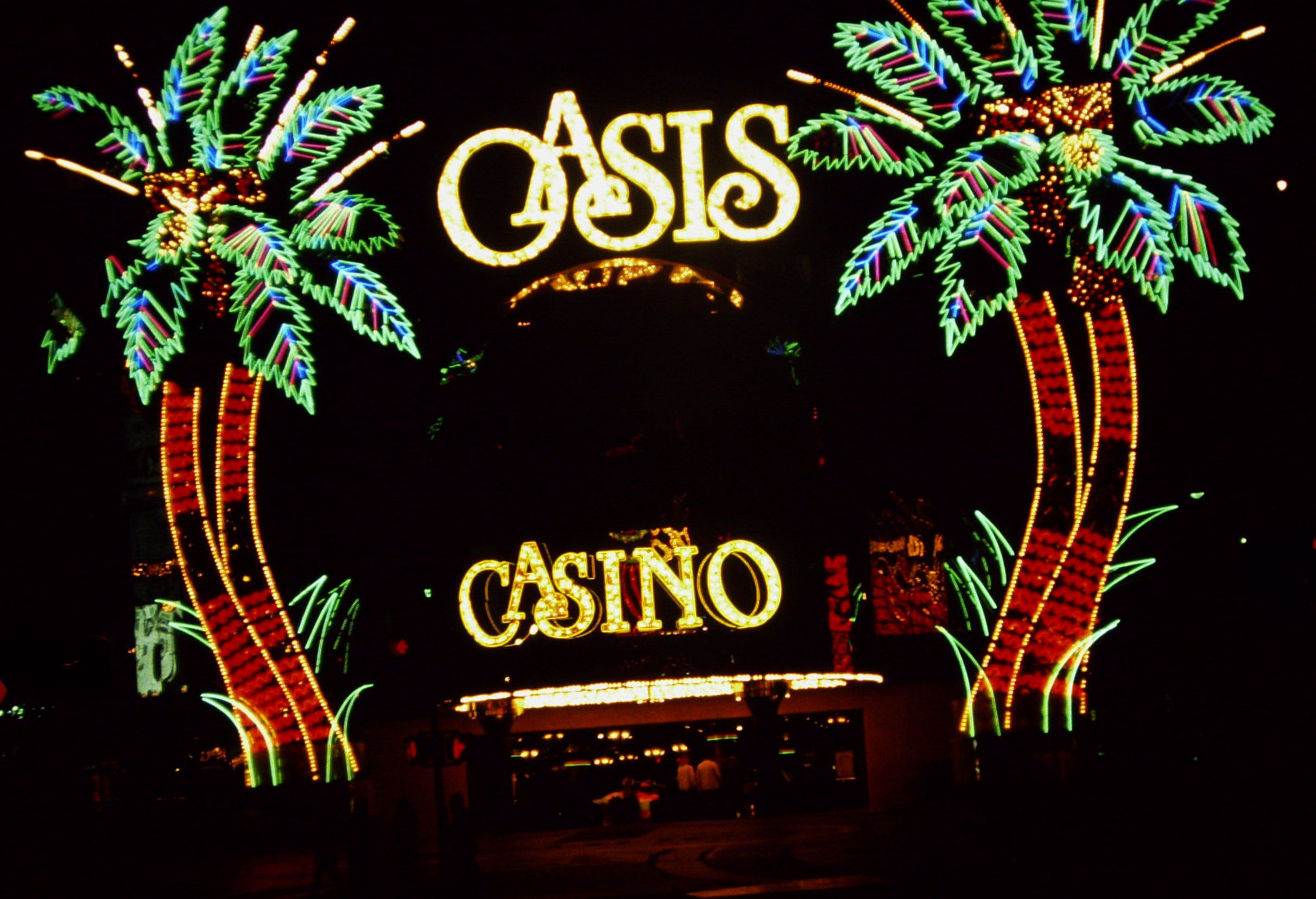
Oasis Casino and neon palm trees

The Dunes featured an Arabian theme, and was designed by Robert Dorr Jr. and John Replogle. The resort initially occupied 85 acres. The casino opened with 120 slot machines. The 6,600 sq ft (610 m^{2}) convention center, opened in 1959, included seating for 800 people. The casino was remodeled in 1961, and a keno lounge would be added 10 years later, part of a $2 million renovation project.

In 1965, the Dunes became the first Strip business to offer a nursery, which would supervise children while their parents enjoyed the resort's amenities. By that point, the Dunes also had two swimming pools and a dozen shops, while additional retailers would be added in 1979.

An 85,000 sq ft (7,900 m^{2}) addition, containing various amenities, was approved by the county in 1981. The expansion cost $15 million, and included the Oasis Casino, which opened on August 20, 1982. The structure, with an exterior of black mirrored glass, was built at a cost of $17 million. The Oasis provided the Dunes property with an additional 18,000 sq ft (1,700 m^{2}) of gaming space. Although the Oasis was a two-story building, it opened without the second floor, which was unfinished and sealed off.

The Oasis Casino featured curved neon palm trees at its entrance, standing 70 feet with fronds 20 feet in length. They were designed by Ad-Art sign designer Jack DuBois, based on early design work by Raul Rodriguez. The palms were dismantled in April 1993, after being sold during the liquidation sale to a buyer in Taiwan. By 1999, the palms had been installed at the entrance to the NASA nightclub in Bangkok. The club closed some time after that, and the whereabouts of the palms are unknown.

=== Hotel ===
The Dunes opened with 194 rooms, and plans for additional rooms were already in the works, although it would be years before they came to fruition. In 1957, plans were announced for a $2 million expansion that would include a 14-story tower. A year later, the proposed tower was increased to 18 stories. An additional 246 rooms were eventually added in 1960, with the opening of the Olympic Wing, joining the existing Seahorse Wing.

Groundbreaking for the tower eventually took place on October 20, 1962. It was designed by Milton Schwartz, and the opening was pushed back because of design changes. The tower eventually opened in May 1965. It had 510 rooms, bringing the total room count to 960. At 21 stories, it was among the tallest buildings in Nevada.

The tower was originally known as Diamond of the Dunes, and was later called the North Tower, following the addition of the South Tower. Construction of the latter began on July 26, 1978, part of a $100 million expansion and remodeling project. The 17-story South Tower was topped off on April 12, 1979, and was opened that December. The second tower was designed by Maxwell Starkman and included 464 rooms, for a new total of 1,282.

=== Golf course ===
The Dunes opened its Emerald Green golf driving range in November 1961. The Emerald Green golf course debuted in 1964, and had its formal opening in April 1965. Since then, the resort was sometimes known as the Dunes Hotel and Country Club, reflecting its golf amenities. The Emerald Green measured 7,240 yards, making it the longest course in Las Vegas. It stretched south from Flamingo Road to Tropicana Avenue, occupying roughly 80 acres along the eastern edge of I-15. Riddle bought the site from banker Jerry Mack and Mel Close, bringing the resort a total of 163 acres.

The Emerald Green's closure in 1993 left the Desert Inn as the only other Strip resort with a golf course. At the time, the Emerald Green had seen an average of 65,000 golfers each year, second only to the Las Vegas Municipal Golf Course. It was especially popular among celebrities. The Emerald Green site is now occupied by parts of Park MGM (opened in 1996) and CityCenter (2009), as well as T-Mobile Arena (2016).

=== Sultan and neon sign ===
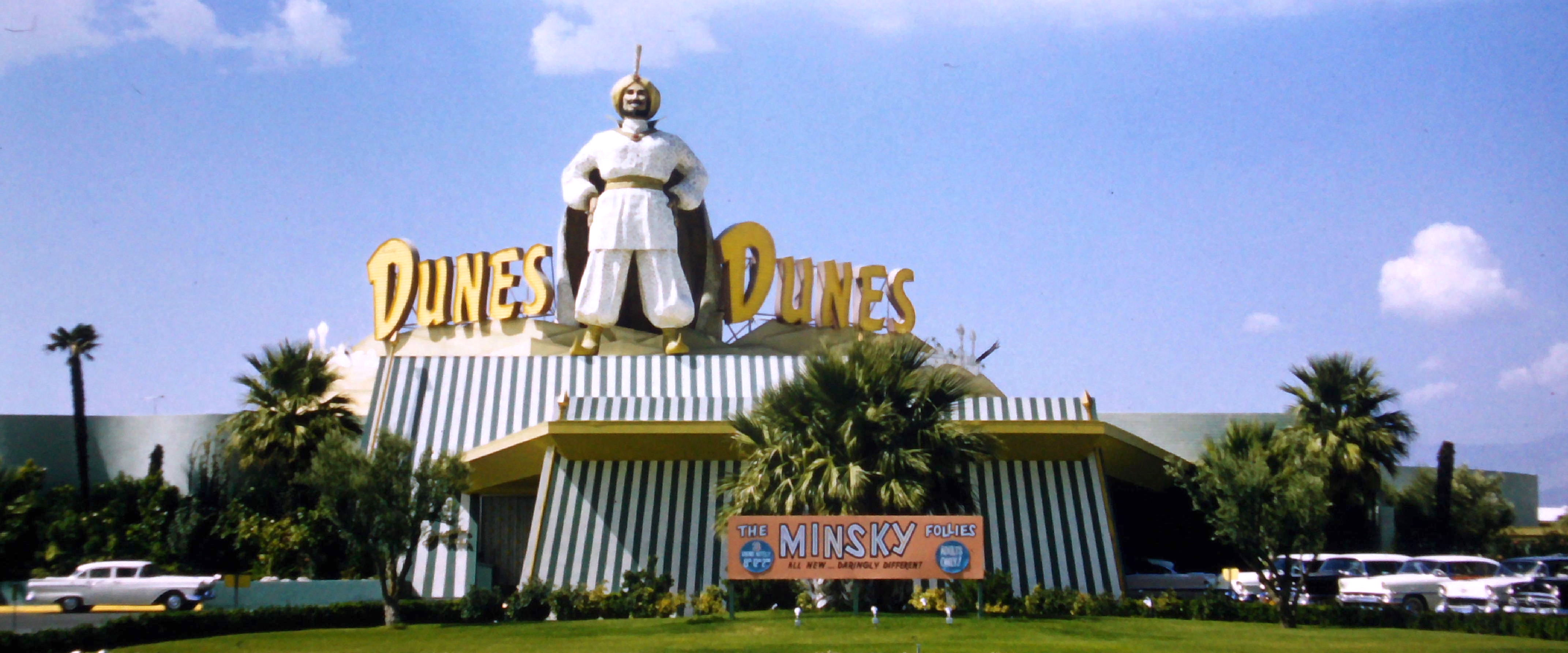
Sultan statue in 1957

The Dunes originally featured a 30-foot-(9-meter-)high sultan statue above its entrance. The fiberglass statue was created by sculptor Kermit Hawkins. The sultan's turban included a diamond that lit up at night, and which was actually a car headlamp that had been put in place. In 1964, the sultan was moved to the edge of the golf course along I-15, serving as an advertisement to motorists. The sultan was destroyed by fire, caused by a short circuit, on the night of December 31, 1985.

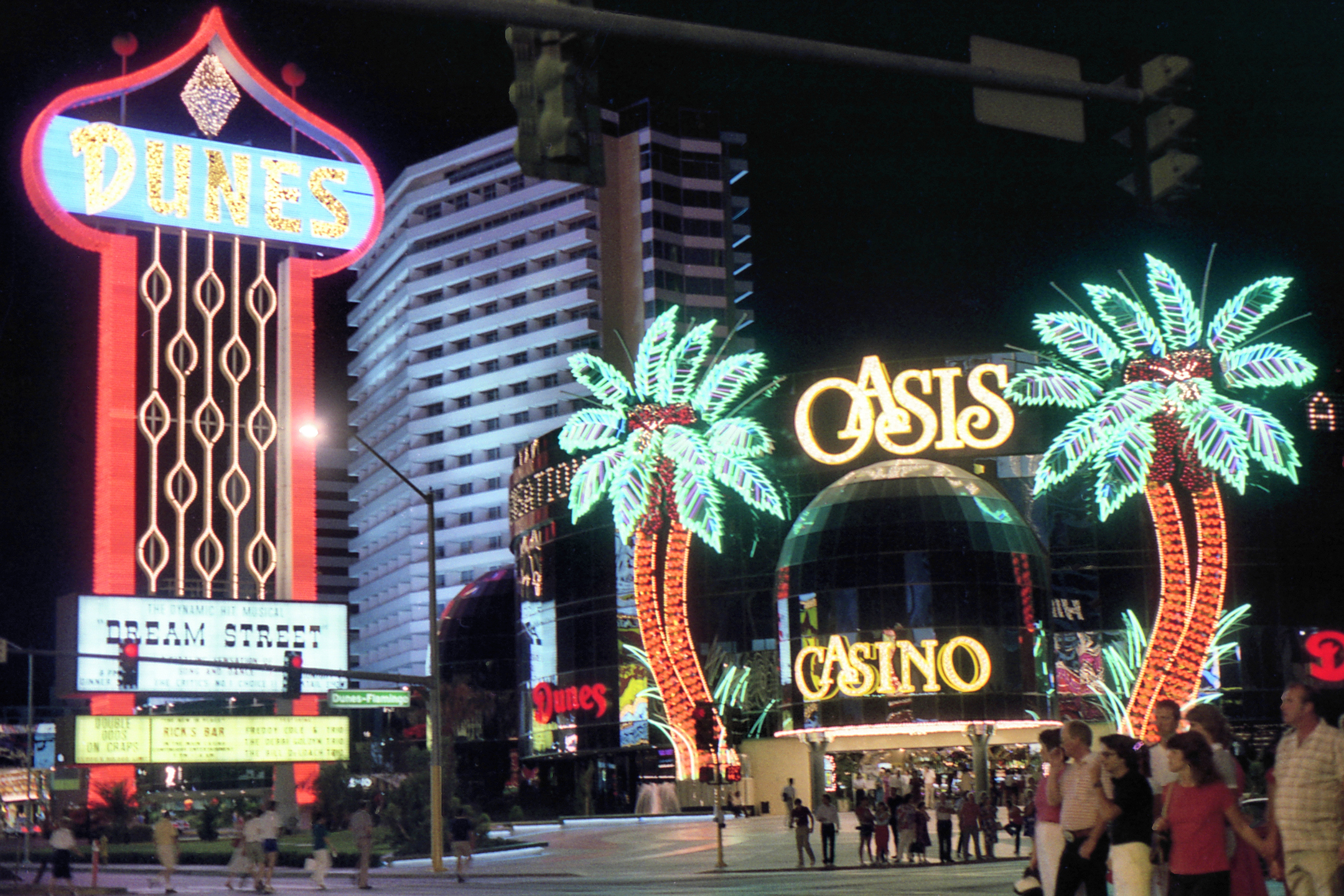
Dunes sign and Oasis Casino, 1983

Lee Klay of the Federal Sign and Signal Company designed a roadside sign for the Dunes, activated on November 12, 1964. Klay recalled that the resort owners asked him to create "a big phallic symbol going up in the sky as far as you can make it". At 181 feet (55 meters), it was the tallest free-standing sign in the world. The foundation measured 80 feet in width, and supported two white-colored columns forming a bulbous onion dome or stylized spade shape at the top. Contained within this shape were two-story-high letters spelling out "Dunes", with a large diamond atop the lettering.

The sign contained 16,000 feet of neon tubing, including 7,200 lamps. At night, the sign lit up in red coloring. Blackout curtains were added in hotel rooms facing the sign, as some guests had trouble sleeping because of the neon lighting. Schwartz objected to the construction of the sign, believing that it conflicted with the design of his hotel tower, although Riddle overrode him. A full-time, three-man team worked to maintain the sign, which had a service elevator going up one of its columns to the top. The sign was intentionally destroyed as part of the 1993 implosion event, with the use of 18-grain detonating cord. Architectural historian Alan Hess had advocated for saving the sign, although Mirage Resorts stated that it was in extremely poor condition, with demolition being cheaper than preservation. Saving the sign would have required it to be disassembled in eight-foot sections, at a cost of up to $100,000.

A smaller, similar sign exists at the city's Neon Museum, with plans to re-light it in 2025. In 2019, filmmaker Tim Burton also debuted a Dunes-inspired sign as part of Lost Vegas: Tim Burton, an exhibit at the Neon Museum. An original neon entrance sign from the resort is also located at the Nevada State Museum in Las Vegas.

=== Restaurants ===
A popular fine-dining restaurant, Sultan's Table, opened on March 4, 1961. It was designed by Schwartz, and included live music for diners. Riddle was inspired to build Sultan's Table after visiting an upscale restaurant, the Villa Fontana, in Mexico City. Sultan's Table was the first gourmet restaurant to open on the Strip, and Diners Club named it "America's finest and most beautiful new restaurant".

The Dunes opened its Dome of the Sea on June 12, 1964. It was a seafood restaurant with an underwater theme. It was also designed by Schwartz, who created the exterior as a circular building that "looked like it came from outer space". Schwartz collaborated with designer Sean Kenny on the interior, which had a budget of $150,000. Images of fish and seaweed were projected onto the restaurant's interior walls. It also featured a harpist, dressed as a mermaid, who performed in the center of the room. For a brief period starting in 1972, the restaurant would transform into Dome After Hours, offering cocktails and continuous live entertainment between the hours of 1:00 and 5:00 a.m.

A restaurant and lounge, Top O' the Strip, opened on June 4, 1965. It was located on the top floor of the new hotel tower, providing views of the city. It was popular among tourists, and also featured live entertainment. It was renamed Top O' the Dunes in 1979.

== Live entertainment ==
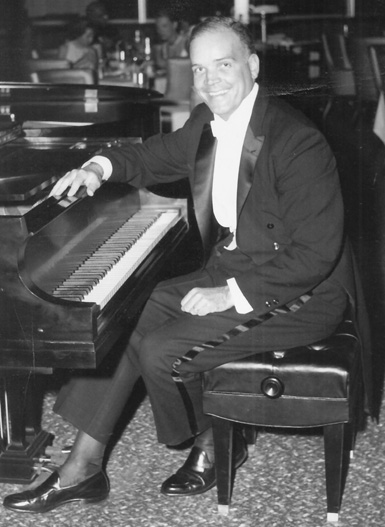
Pianist Jack Melick at Sultan's Table, 1966

Comedian Wally Cox was an early entertainer at the Dunes, opening there in July 1955, although he was fired due to poor audience reception. Gottesman acknowledged that Cox was ill-prepared and brought no new material to his performances. Cox had been signed for four weeks, but only gave three performances. Comedian Stan Irwin briefly filled in for Cox, who was then hired back later in the month.

Entertainers at Top O' the Strip included Art and Dotty Todd, Russ Morgan, and Bob Anderson. The Dunes also opened a Comedy Store location in 1984, hosting numerous comedians. It relocated to the Golden Nugget hotel-casino in 1990, but briefly returned to the Dunes in 1992.

=== Shows ===
The Dunes' 1955 opening included Vera-Ellen in a production show titled New York-Paris-Paradise, which was contracted for a four-week run. It was part of Gottesman's policy to focus on shows rather than big-name stars; he said, "There aren't enough name stars in the world to play all the Vegas hotels". New York-Paris-Paradise was directed by Robert Nesbitt and played in the Dunes' showroom, known as the Arabian Room.

On January 10, 1957, Riddle debuted Las Vegas' first topless show, titled Minsky Goes to Paris. Riddle said, "We have something people can't get on television". The show's success inspired other resorts to debut their own topless shows. During 1958, the show was attracting 9,000 viewers weekly. Later known as Minsky's Follies, the show ran until 1961.

Riddle brought Tenderloin, a Broadway musical, to the Dunes in May 1961. The Broadway show Guys and Dolls, starring Betty Grable and Dan Dailey, also played at the Dunes for about six months, starting in 1962.

The Dunes opened a new venue, the Persian Room, in December 1961. It replaced the Sinbad Cocktail Lounge. The Persian Room debuted with Vive Les Girls, a French musical revue by Frederic Apcar. It was successful, becoming an annual show at the Dunes. It closed in 1971, when the Persian Room was replaced by the keno lounge.

The Dunes had also debuted another show by Apcar in December 1963, titled Casino de Paris and initially starring Line Renaud, and then Violetta Villas. The show cost approximately $6 million to create, featuring 100 cast members and more than 500 costumes. The show incorporated a custom stage known as the Octopus or Octuramic. Designed by Schwartz and Kenny, the stage had several arms capable of extending 50 feet above the audience. Circular dancing platforms, 20 feet in diameter, were built at the end of each arm, allowing showgirls to dance above the audience. The show ended in June 1981, due to the high costs of putting it on each week.

Showstoppers, a family show by Jeff Kutash, was planned to open in 1990, but was canceled before its premiere.

=== Boxing ===
Many major professional boxing events took place at the Dunes from 1975 to 1990; notably the May 20, 1983, undercard that featured Ossie Ocasio retaining his WBA's world Cruiserweight title by fifteen round unanimous decision over Randy Stephens, Greg Page beat Renaldo Snipes by twelve rounds unanimous decision in a WBC's Heavyweight division elimination bout, Michael Dokes retained his WBA world Heavyweight title with a fifteen-round draw (tie) over Mike Weaver in their rematch, and Larry Holmes won over Tim Witherspoon by a twelve-round split decision to retain his WBC world Heavyweight title. This was the first time in history that two world Heavyweight championship fights took place on the same day.

== In popular culture ==
The Dunes made numerous appearances in television, including a 1964 episode of Arrest and Trial. It is featured in a 1977 episode of The Bionic Woman titled "Fembots in Las Vegas", and a 1978 episode of Charlie's Angels titled "Angels in Vegas". The Dunes sign is used in the intro of the television series Vega$, and the resort is seen in the pilot episode of the 1980s television series Knight Rider, titled "Knight of the Phoenix". It also appears in the season-two premiere episode "Goliath".

The Dunes made film appearances as well, including the 1971 James Bond movie Diamonds Are Forever, in which it serves as the office of Whyte House casino manager Bert Saxby. The Dunes sign also makes an appearance in the film, and a deleted scene, available on home media releases, takes place in the Dome of the Sea restaurant.

In the 1984 film Oxford Blues, the main character (portrayed by Rob Lowe) works as a parking attendant at the Dunes. The sign and hotel also appear in the 1984 film Cannonball Run II, and are seen in the closing credits of the 1989 film K-9. The sign also appears in the 1991 comedy Hot Shots!, when the pilot nicknamed "Wash Out" mistakes a runway and lands near the hotel. The 1991 film Harley Davidson and the Marlboro Man includes footage of the casino and hotel, including its rooftop.

The hotel's 1993 implosion was filmed for Treasure Island: The Adventure Begins, a television special promoting Wynn's Treasure Island resort. The implosion is also among other Las Vegas resort demolitions featured during the closing credits of the 2003 film The Cooler.

The Dunes is shown across from the fictional Tangiers hotel and casino at the beginning of the 1995 film Casino, directed by Martin Scorsese. The Dunes is also seen during the Las Vegas sequence of Scorsese's 2019 film The Irishman.

== See also ==
- List of Las Vegas Strip hotels
