= Mike Goodman =

American gambler, pit boss, and author

Tinted photograph used on back cover of books

Mike Goodman was an American professional gambler, a pit boss for a Las Vegas casino, and an author of books that gave advice on gambling and told stories of gamblers and their escapades. He is most known for his 1963 book How to Win: At Cards, Dice, Races, Roulette, which went through many printings and sold over a million copies.

== Early life, gambler and casino employee ==
Goodman was born in Rochester, New York. By one account, he was already gambling with dice at eight years of age. Growing up he worked as a waiter at Cohen's Kosher Restaurant on Joseph Avenue in Rochester.

He came under the tutelage of Pat Mangin, a well-known professional gambler in the Rochester area. Goodman began working as a professional gambler himself around the early 1930s.

After he was married in 1938 to Lillian Goodman (née Gordon) of Rochester, Goodman's son Michael J. was born in 1942. He and his wife had three children in total—Gail and James, in addition to Michael J. Goodman worked for gambling clubs along the East Coast, and the family moved several times, from New York City to Washington, D.C., to Hollywood, Florida, changing locations when gambling became illegal in a place. Goodman also worked in locations such as Saratoga Springs, New York and Hot Springs, Arkansas, typically being employed as a club's "house man".

Subsequently, Goodman and his family moved to Las Vegas, Nevada, where the legality of casino gambling was firmly established, and they settled down there. By 1963 he was pit boss at the Dunes Hotel and Casino on the Las Vegas Strip. It was a position he would hold for a number of years.

== Author ==
Goodman's paperback book How to Win: At Cards, Dice, Races, Roulette came out in 1963 from Holloway House. It was written by celebrity ghostwriter Leo Guild, based upon a large set of notes that Goodman had prepared. Guild also wrote a brief foreword for the book.

How to Win mainly covers strategies for playing blackjack, craps, and roulette in casinos, and for betting on horse racing (there are also brief chapters on poker and slot machines). Goodman criticizes "system players", believing they inevitably ended up losing, and to a newspaper writer said, "God have mercy on the system players." Interspersed throughout How to Win are various colorful stories about what goes on in casinos and cautionary tales about gamblers. One of the latter concerns the master card mechanic "Little Abe", also known as "the Professor", who never got caught in the act but ended up dying penniless due to a narcotics habit.

The Democrat and Chronicle of Rochester called How to Win "a lively book ... and an expert one." A review in the Nevada State Journal acknowledged that How to Win packed considerable information together with many anecdotes; however, it said that "His style is as fast as any of the craps games in his casino, in fact it goes too fast."

The book came out just as the initial card counting systems for blackjack were becoming known, and Goodman took strident umbrage at any such mathematically oriented systems. The back cover for various printings of How to Win had Goodman saying he was "just plain sick and tired" of reading about "experts" pushing such systems, calling out by name Edward O. Thorp, John Scarne, Mike McDougall, and someone going as "Mike Barron". In large bold letters, he said "I CHALLENGE" any of them to take their systems to the Dunes or to debate him in public.

How to Win was immensely successful. During 1963, a bookstore in Claremont, California, listed it as its fifth-best-selling paperback (first was Seven Days in May). By early 1965, it was said to have sold 700,000 copies, and was included as a bonus in offers for a Las Vegas guest plan membership card. By 1967 it was on its eighth printing and had sold over a million copies, causing ghostwriter Guild to publicly rue that he had accepted a flat fee for his work on it instead of an ongoing royalty. By 1969, it was on its eleventh printing. In each of 1970, 1971, and 1972, printings came out with additional copyright dates and an "Editor's Supplement" on international gambling.

In 1965, Goodman was the author of Slots & Pinballs, issued as part of the How to win the Las Vegas way series by a publisher called Gambling International. It was a 64-page pictorial book, the cover for which claimed endorsement of aging gambling legend Nick the Greek. Arthur Dutton was credited as a special consultant on Slots & Pinballs.

His third book, Mike Goodman's Your Best Bet, was published in hardcover by Brooke House in 1975. It was co-authored by Goodman's son, Michael J. Goodman, who had been working as a reporter for the Reno Evening Gazette among other papers. It continued to present Goodman's long-standing criticism of system players, and again stressed money management as a better approach. Like its predecessor, the book also included stories about gamblers, although a review in the Detroit Free Press felt the tales were not always that interesting. In part, Your Best Bet served to update How to Win regarding changes in casino games, especially the advent of the multi-deck blackjack shoe. It also incorporated a travelogue of international casinos in a number of countries, giving Goodman's strongly voiced views which to try and which to avoid.

A paperback edition of Your Best Bet was published by Ballantine Books in 1977, and reached a second printing in 1979. By that time, Goodman had retired as a casino manager.

== Legacy ==
Goodman's son Michael, who had co-authored Your Best Bet, went on to have a long career as an investigative reporter with the Los Angeles Times, a career that included criminality-related examinations of some of same casino people his father engaged in business dealings with.

From a twenty-first century, analytics-based perspective, the Goodman books are not held in high regard – as professional gambler, author, and radio host Richard W. Munchkin wrote in 2013, "These books were filled with a lot of nonsense about how to gamble, and about gamblers who were 'sharp' or 'tough' because they knew to bet more when they got on a streak." Nonetheless, e-book editions of How to Win came out in 2016 from Golden Springs Publishing for both the Amazon Kindle and Barnes & Noble Nook.

In any case, Goodman's books were never intended to promise a mathematically oriented winning system; rather, as one reviewer stated, they were aimed with the notion that the advice within would help someone coming to a casino to "understand and enjoy your time at the tables – and maybe even win more than you lose." And the stories of Vegas gamblers and casino employees contained within them still capture some of the allure and color of their time.

== Writings ==
- How to Win: At Cards, Dice, Races, Roulette (Holloway House, 1963)
- Slots & Pinballs: How to win the Las Vegas way (Gambling International, 1965) [with consultant Arthur Dutton]
- Mike Goodman's Your Best Bet (Brooke House, 1975) [co-author with Michael J. Goodman]
