= Ira Bruce Reines =

American sculptor

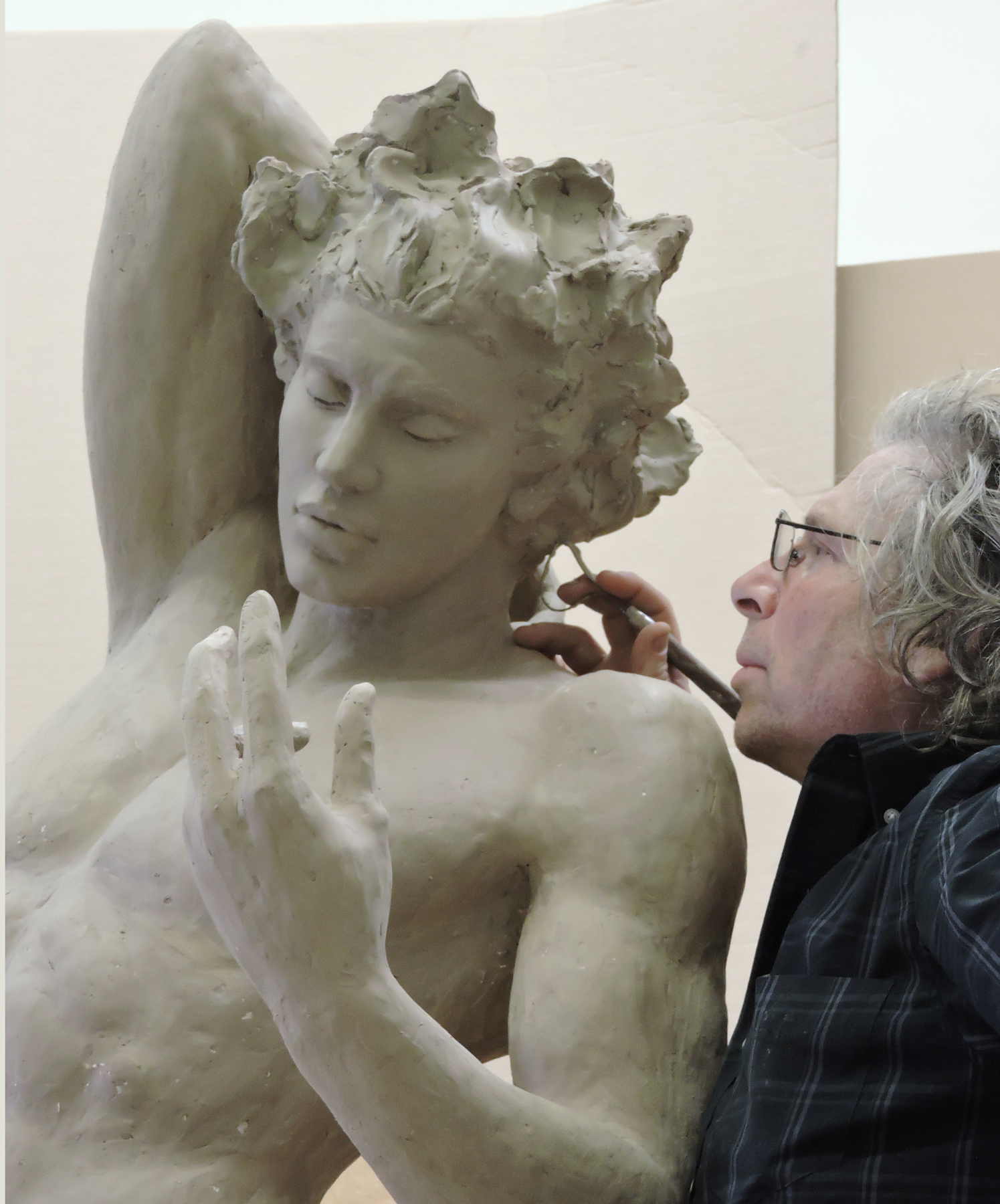
- Reines at work in 2016
- Born: December 3, 1957 (age 68); New York, New York
- Known for: Sculptor

Ira Bruce Reines (born December 3, 1957) is an American artist best known for his bronze sculptures. He currently resides in Norwalk, Connecticut.

== Biography ==
Born in New York City, Reines began making clay figurines at age 6. After the family moved to Connecticut when Reines was 15, he began to win art competitions. Entirely self-taught and garnering accolades, at 19 the director of the Medallic Art Company offered Reines a job sculpting medallions. After a few years of developing his plaster skills, Reines caught the attention of Art Deco master, Erté. For the next eleven years, Reines worked alongside Erté, transforming Erté's two-dimensional works into three-dimensional bronze sculptures. This collaboration continued until Erté's death in 1990. These sculptures became known as the Erté Sculpture Collections and are housed in the permanent collections of both the Metropolitan Museum of Art and the Smithsonian.

Reines' work has drawn comparisons to Renaissance masters, Gian Lorenzo Bernini and Benvenuto Cellini, as well as 20th century sculptor, Frederick Hart.

It was not until the early 2000s that Reines fully developed his own stylistic-voice which he calls, "Sculptural Etherealism." Reines' work can be found in collections in the United States, Europe, and Asia.

== Works ==
Reines' sculptures have been exhibited in a number of notable museums and are currently installed in several public places.

- Victoria & Albert Museum
- Society of the Four Arts
- Garner-Webb University
- Coral Springs Museum of Art
- Evansville Museum of Art
- Shanghai Duolun Museum of Modern Art
