= Society of the Four Arts =

American art organization

Coordinates: 26°42′23″N 80°02′32″W

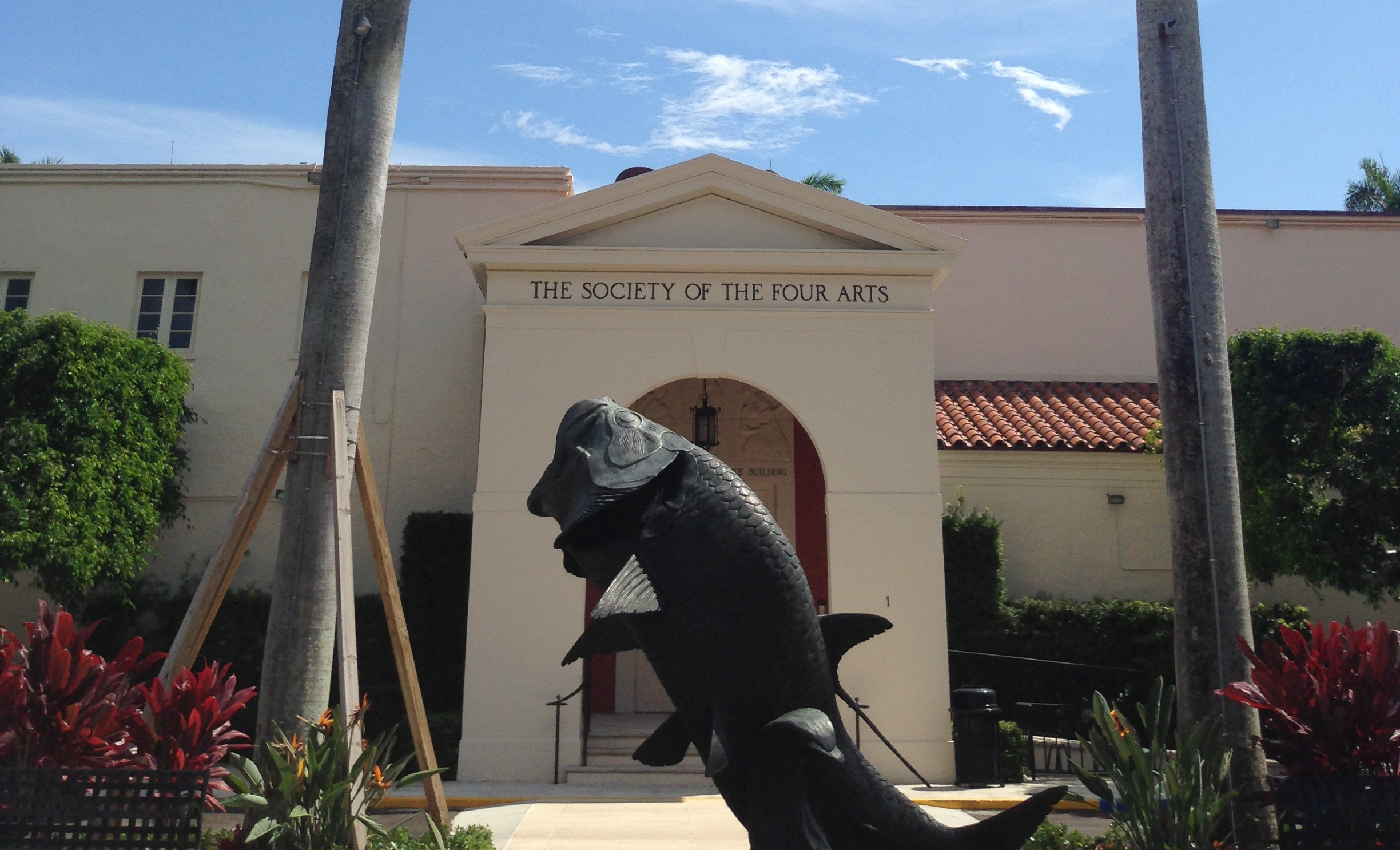
Society of the Four Arts, in 2013

The Society of the Four Arts is a non-profit charity organization that was founded in 1936. Its campus on the Intracoastal Waterway in Palm Beach is home to the Esther B. O’Keeffe Gallery Building, which includes the Esther B. O’Keeffe Art Gallery, a concert hall auditorium, two libraries, an administration building, and gardens. The Plaza's original building, designed by Maurice Fatio, now serves as the town's library. The O'Keefe Gallery building was designed by architect Addison Mizner.

The Mary Alice Fortin Children's Art Gallery is on the second floor of the Rovensky Administration building, as well as the Four Arts Children’s Library.

The Four Arts Gardens, also known as the Four Arts Library, Gardens and Philip Hulitar Sculpture Gardens, are nonprofit botanical gardens at 100 Four Arts Plaza, Palm Beach, Florida on the campus of The Society of the Four Arts. The area consists of two gardens, including the Philip Hulitar Sculpture Gardens and the Four Arts Botanical Gardens. The gardens are open seven days a week, and there is no charge for admission. The society's two libraries serve as the local public libraries for the Town of Palm Beach.

The current president and CEO of the Society of the Four Arts is the past museum director of the Peggy Guggenheim Collection and art critic Philip Rylands.

== Four Arts Botanical Gardens ==
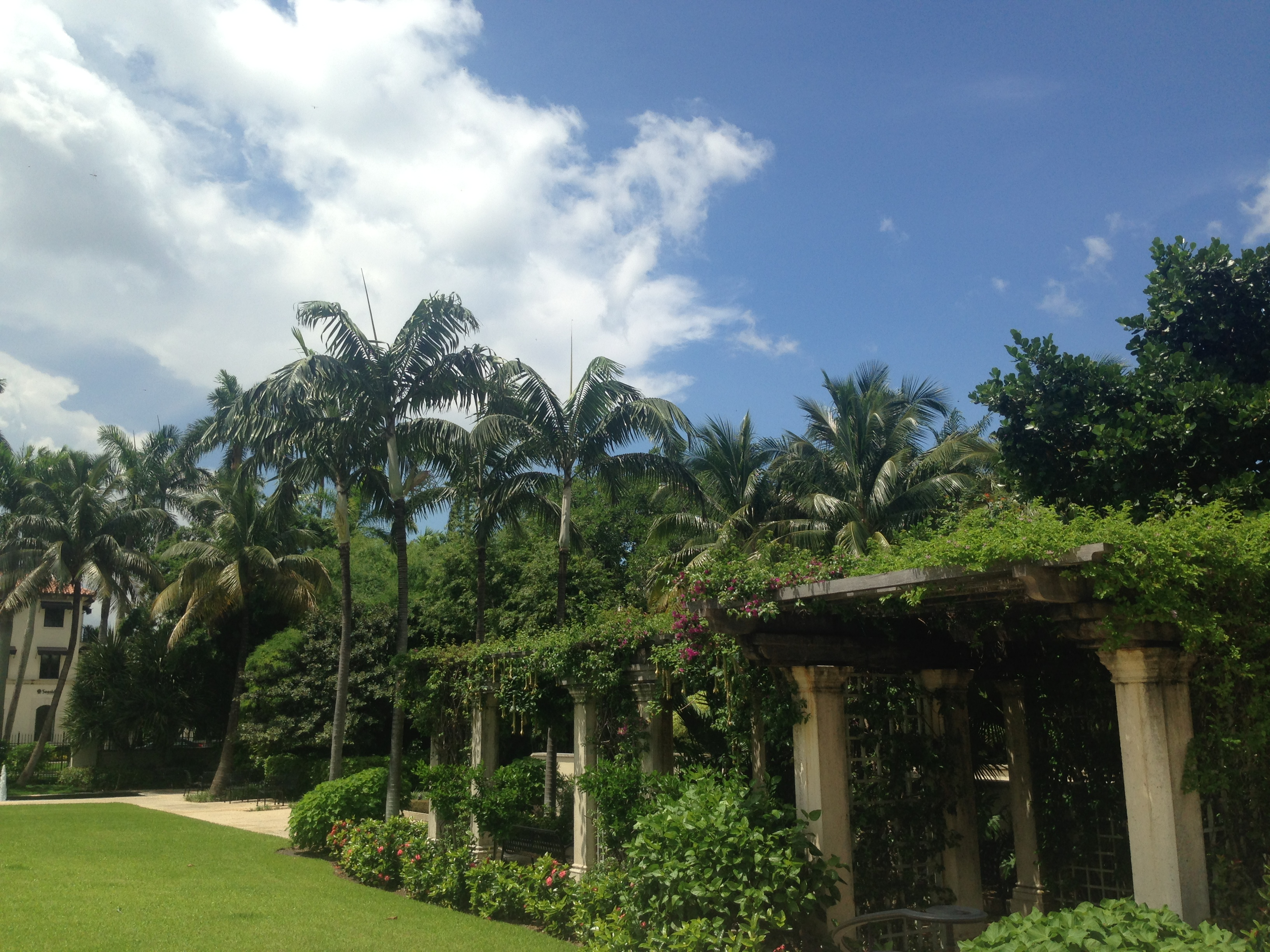
Botanical garden, in 2013

The Four Arts Botanical Gardens are demonstration gardens maintained by the Palm Beach Garden Club, in partnership with property owners, The Society of the Four Arts. Seven society ladies and one gentleman planned the original gardens in the 1930s, to incorporate a series of garden rooms with different themes. Its original purpose was to display the diversity of tropical plants suitable for landscaping in the South Florida climate. Seven demonstration gardens illustrate different styles of landscaping and information on drought and heat tolerant plants.

Founder Mrs. J.S. Phipps built a Spanish façade to demonstrate plantings suitable for a Spanish-style house. Mrs. Joseph F. Gunster created a moonlight garden of white-blooming vines and shrubs. Mrs. Clifford V. Brokaw landscaped an area suitable for a colonial-style house; Mrs. Lorenzo Woodhouse designed a beautiful Chinese garden as a memorial to her daughter. Mrs. Hugh Dillman planted a rose garden; Dr. LeRoy Dow, a jungle garden, and Mrs. Alfred G. Kay used a wall fountain with a Madonna sculpture as a focal point for a garden of small tropical fruit trees.

In the 1950s, the landscape architecture firm of Innocenti & Webel was retained to improve the garden’s architectural features, to relate the garden’s separate elements more closely to one another, and to create a master plan which included many rare specimen plants.

In the summer of 2004, hurricanes Frances and Jeanne all but destroyed the Four Arts Gardens. The Four Arts undertook a major reconstruction project that not only restored the gardens according to Innocenti & Webel’s master plan, but also added new irrigation, re-circulating pumps for fountains, a new electrical system, more comfortable seating, and improved walkways to ensure accessibility for the handicapped and safety for all visitors. Irrigation, electrical, and drainage systems have been significantly modernized, but remain hidden.

== Philip Hulitar Sculpture Gardens ==
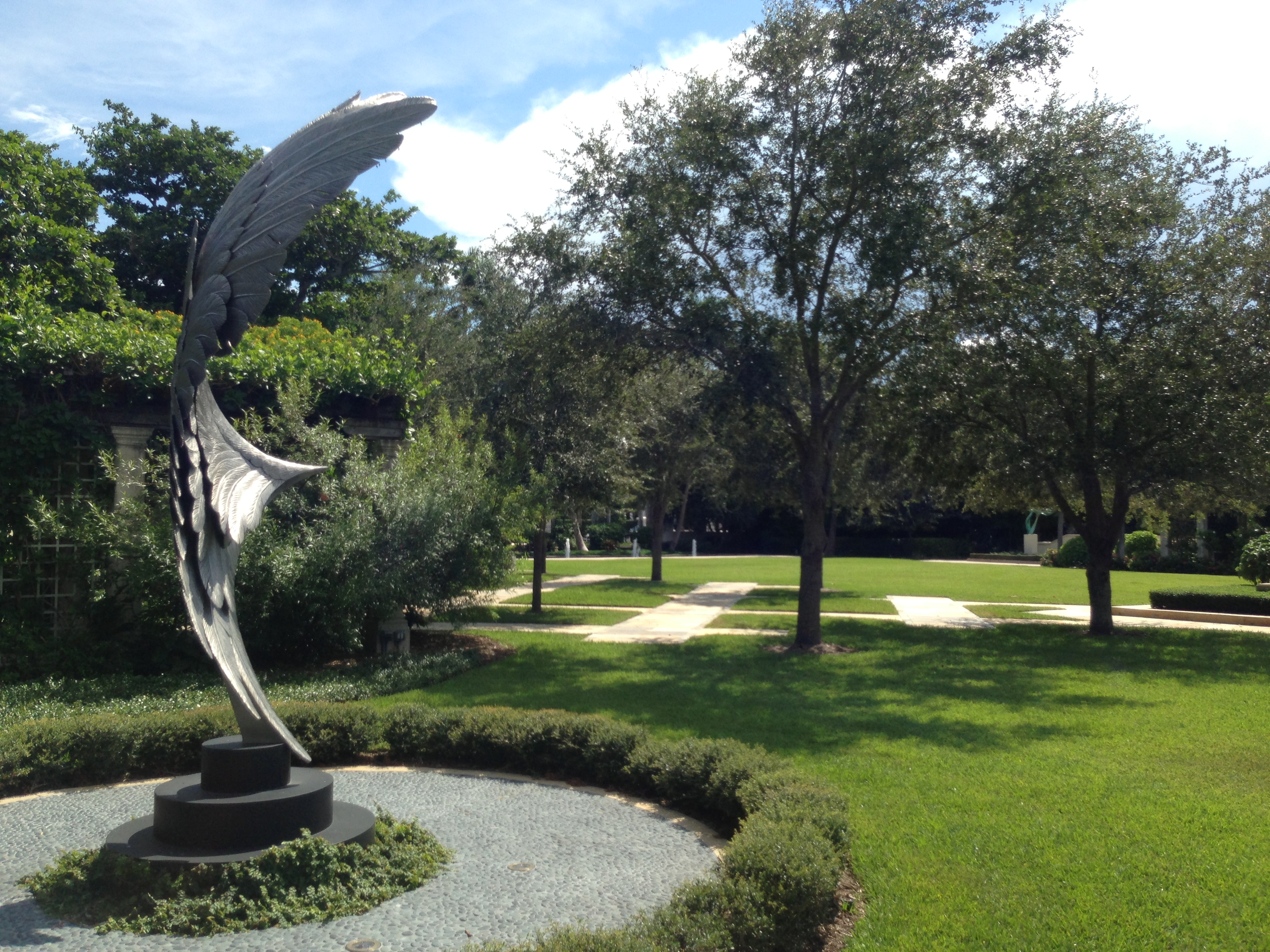
Sculpture garden, in 2013

Adjacent to the botanical gardens is the Philip Hulitar Sculpture Garden, which serves as an outdoor museum, urban park, and botanical garden for the town of Palm Beach. Sculptures are curated by The Society of the Four Arts, advised by its Art Acquisition Committee.

In 1979, Palm Beach resident Philip Hulitar was approached by The Society of the Four Arts, and asked to draft a plan which included a garden wall and sculpture garden on a previously undeveloped land lot, subsequently named in honor of its designer. In February 2002, The Four Arts announced plans to enhance the Hulitar Sculpture garden by adding the park-like elements seen today: new walkways and plantings, fountains and seating, security and event lighting, a plaza and fountain, and a garden pavilion. The landscape architecture firm Morgan Wheelock, Inc was selected for the design.

Among many others, sculptures currently on display include works by Lawrence Holofcener, Luis Montoya, Leslie Ortiz, Felipe Castaneda, Diana Guest, Philip Jackson, Dan Ostermiller, Ira Bruce Reines, Jose Antonio Villalobos, and Augusts Saint-Gaudens.

== See also ==
- List of botanical gardens in the United States
