= Sid Wyman =

American poker player and hotel owner (1910–1978)

- Born: June 1, 1910; St. Louis, Missouri, U.S.
- Died: June 1978 (age 68)
- Occupation: Casino owner

Sidney Wyman (June 1, 1910 – June 1978) was a poker player and hotel owner in Las Vegas, Nevada.

== Biography ==
Wyman was born in St. Louis, Missouri to a Jewish family, Wyman was a gambler and co-owner of several Las Vegas casinos including the Sands, Riviera, Royal Nevada, and The Dunes. In 1979, Wyman was made a charter member of the Poker Hall of Fame.

Wyman died on June 26, 1978, of cancer at Cedars Sinai Medical Center in Los Angeles. He never married but had a long time girl friend. He was buried at Hillside Memorial Park.
