= Bal Tabarin (Paris) =

Former cabaret in Paris, France

Coordinates: 48.8812°N 2.3368°E

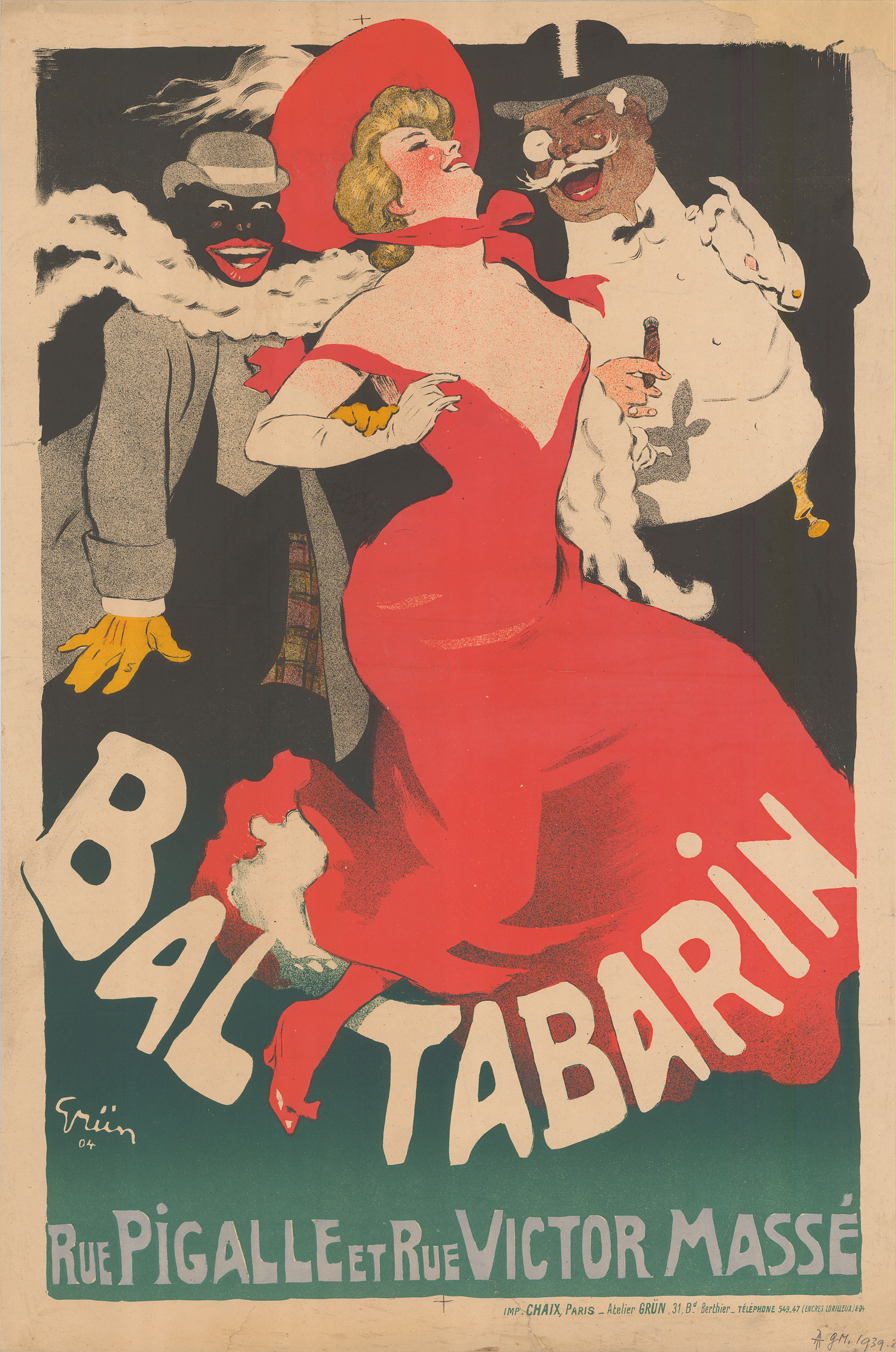
Poster by Jules-Alexandre Grün

Bal Tabarin was the name of a cabaret located at 36, rue Victor-Massé in the 9th arrondissement, Paris, France.

It was opened in 1904 by the composer and orchestra leader Auguste Bosc (1868–1945). It was an immediate success. In 1928 Pierre Sandrini (son of the prima ballerina Emma Sandrini and artistic director of the Moulin Rouge) and Pierre Dubout took over the establishment. Sandrini introduced ballet to his floor shows, and dress designs by Erté transformed them into spectacular tableaux. There was a new show every year, each with a theme, such as The Planets or The Symphony; some were inspired by historical figures such as Cleopatra and Madame de Pompadour.

During the occupation of Paris it was frequented by German officers. At this time the South African dancer Florence Waren performed there. Unknown to the Germans, she was Jewish, but she was still interned for several months as an enemy alien. On her release she returned to the Bal Tabarin and paired up with Frederic Apcar to form the dancing duo "Florence et Frederic". They became famous, appearing on stage with the likes of Edith Piaf and Maurice Chevalier, while Waren at the same time aided the French Resistance.

After the war Bal Tabarin was taken over by the proprietors of the Moulin Rouge, who closed it in 1953.

The name Tabarin was the pseudonym of Jean Salomon (1584-1626), a well-known seller of quack medicines, whose partner Phillipe Girard used the name Tamarin Mondor.

== Namesake ==
A nightclub using this name was opened at 1025 Columbus Avenue, San Francisco in 1931 by bandleader Tom Gerun, manager Frank Martinelli, and businessman Bob Grison. Noted architect Timothy Pflueger was responsible for the building's design. The club was sold to Agustino "Bimbo" Giuntoli in 1951 and reopened as Bimbo's 365 Club, which is still operating today.

In 1953, Gerun became part owner of the Cal-Vada Lodge Hotel in Crystal Bay, Nevada. He changed the name to Bal Tabarin. After a change of owners in 1958, it closed in 1960.
