= Royal Nevada =

Casino hotel in Nevada, United States

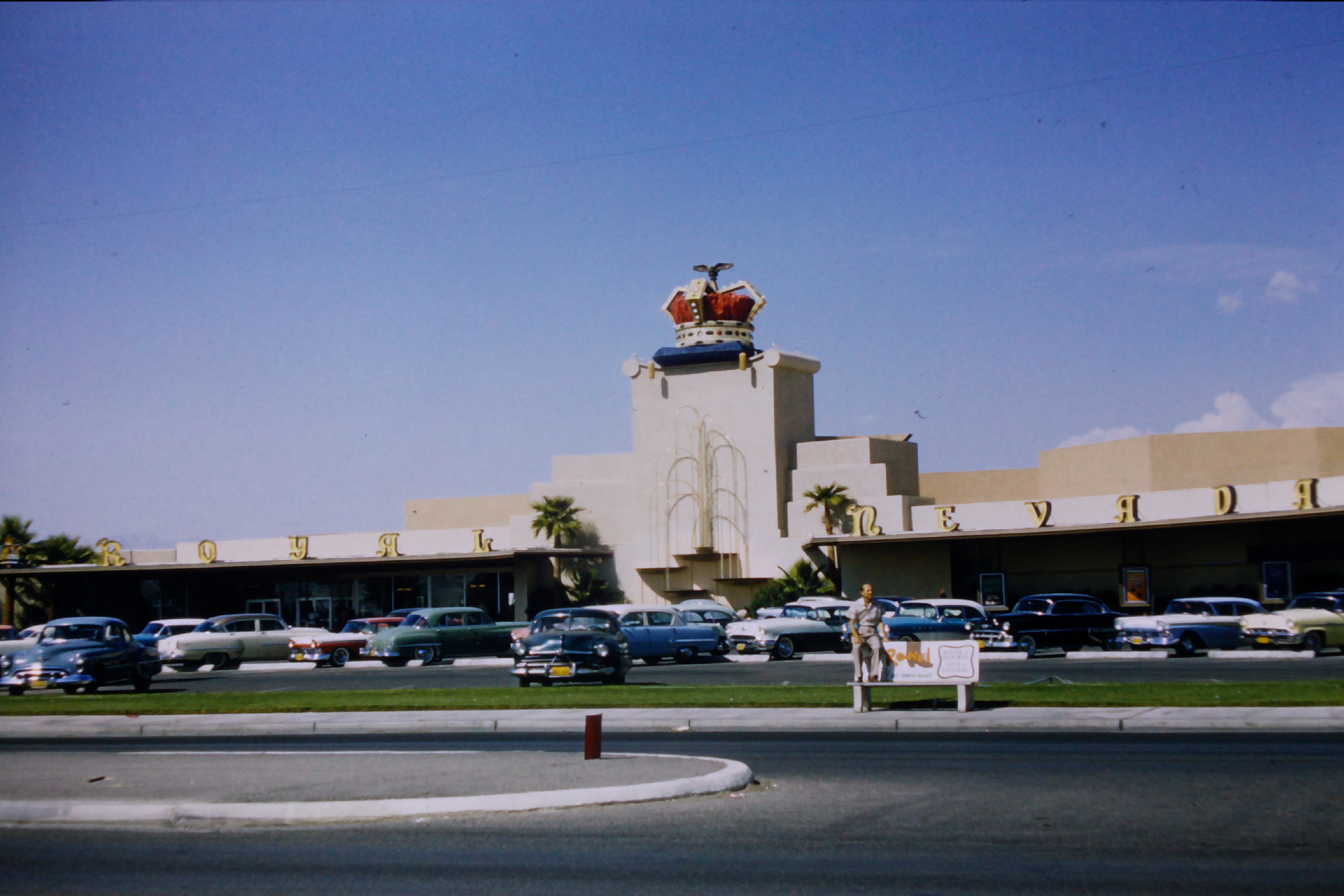
- Royal Nevada in September 1957

- Location within Las Vegas Strip Location within Nevada
- Interactive map of Royal Nevada
- Location: Winchester, Nevada; 36.132455°N 115.166025°W
- Opened: April 19, 1955
- Closed: January 30, 1958 (casino) 2006 (hotel)
- No. of rooms: 233
- Permanent shows: Dancing Waters
- Casino type: Land-based
- Owner: Frank Fishman
- Architect: Paul Revere Williams

Royal Nevada was a hotel and casino located on the Las Vegas Strip in Winchester, Nevada. It was owned by Frank Fishman, who leased it to various individuals during its brief history. The resort was designed by Paul Revere Williams, and construction began in August 1954. The Royal Nevada opened on April 19, 1955, and was among four Las Vegas resorts to open within a six-week period, at a time when demand had declined for additional hotel rooms. The resort faced numerous financial problems, and was closed and reopened several times.

A lack of financing forced the resort to close less than a year after its opening. It was then leased to a group associated with the New Frontier resort, located just south. The hotel was reopened in 1956, followed a year later by the casino. In 1957, the Nevada Gaming Control Board filed an eight-count complaint against the resort, alleging issues such as inadequate finances and card cheating by one of its dealers. The casino closed for the last time on January 30, 1958. Later that year, the hotel-casino was taken over by the operators of the Stardust resort, located directly north. The Royal Nevada was renamed as the Stardust Auditorium, serving as convention space and providing additional rooms for the Stardust. It remained a part of the Stardust until the resort's demolition in 2007.

== History ==
=== Pre-opening ===
The Royal Nevada was originally proposed by Frank Fishman as the Sunrise Hotel. Fishman owned hotels in California and Texas, and the Nevada Tax Commission approved him for a gaming license in September 1953. He had no prior gaming experience and expected to hire a casino manager. Fishman initially planned to finance construction himself and with money from a Los Angeles bank. The Sunrise would have 200 rooms and would be built on the Las Vegas Strip, directly north of the Last Frontier hotel.

By the end of 1953, the $2.5 million project had been renamed the Royal Nevada, and Fishman recruited a group of Miami businessmen to help finance the project, although a new gaming license application would have to be filed to account for the new partners. An alleged advertisement by Fisher had claimed to potential partners that he had connections and could acquire the necessary gaming licenses. Fishman denied these concerns when the tax commission brought them up, saying that he did not use his gaming license to attract partners. He said that he needed investors after enlarging the project, which was necessary to help it compete with other luxury resorts. A new application for a gaming license was submitted in January 1954, although the Miami group withdrew the application two months later, after breaking up with Fishman.

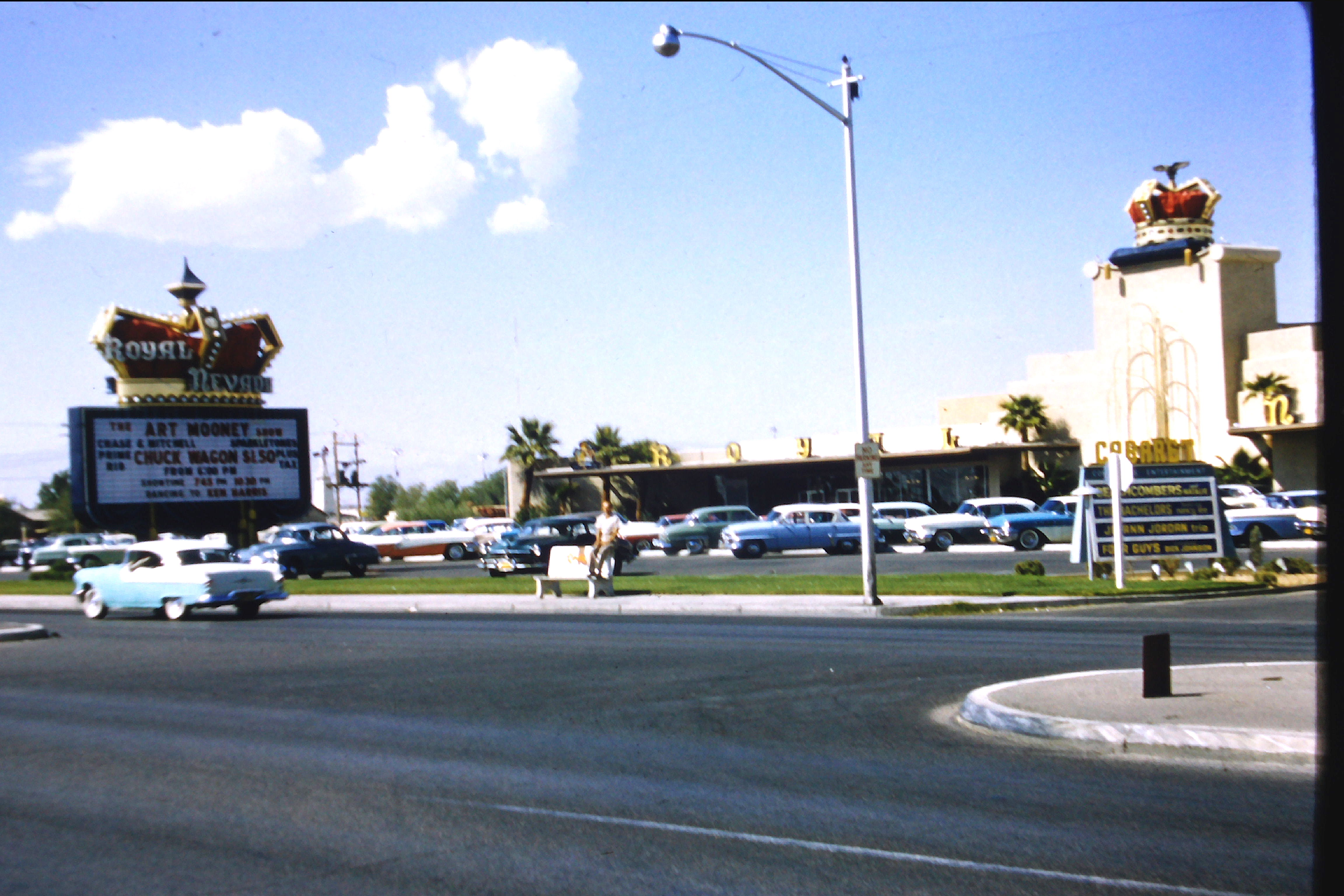
Royal Nevada and roadside sign in September 1957

Fishman bought out his former partners' interest and reapplied for a gaming license in April 1954. Two months later, Fishman hired Hahn-St. John Construction Company to build the resort. Groundbreaking took place on July 8, 1954, and construction began on August 16, with completion expected by the end of 1954. The Royal Nevada was designed by Paul Revere Williams, while John Replogle of Las Vegas served as the structural engineer. The resort was built at a cost of $5 million. A large, jeweled crown was located above the entrance, and was made of three karat gold leaf and glass. It was designed by Young Electric Sign Company (YESCO). Another large crown was located atop the resort's roadside sign. Parts of the crown were made of fiberglass, which was used to represent velvet material.

Eddie Rio, the western regional director of the American Guild of Variety Artists, was hired as the resort's entertainment director in October 1954. An investment man, Leon Stoller, had arranged for Fishman and Sam Miller to form a partnership in the new resort. At the end of 1954, Stoller sued over a lack of payment for his services. A few months later, the Feuz-Page Construction Company also filed a suit against Fishman, seeking the remainder of money that was due for its services.

The Royal Nevada was originally scheduled to open in January 1955. However, following an investigation, the tax commission determined in February 1955 that Fishman, Miller, and a third partner were not suitable for a gaming license. The trio were soon removed as stockholders, and other shareholders of the Royal Nevada were approved for a gaming license in March 1955. Fishman maintained ownership of the resort and leased its facilities to a group of operators from St. Louis and Florida, but he himself had no involvement in the actual operations. Sid Wyman would serve as the managing director, and also briefly held an ownership interest.

=== Opening and closure ===
Ahead of its public opening, the Royal Nevada hosted a private party on April 18, 1955, for soldiers from the Nevada Test Site. The public opening occurred on the following day, with opera singer Helen Traubel as the headliner. It was the eighth resort to open on the Las Vegas Strip. It was also among four new Las Vegas resorts that opened within a six-week period, resulting in financial troubles for each of them. The area had been overbuilt with hotel rooms amid a lessened demand. Creditors were another cause for the resort's financial difficulties. Within months of its opening, Feuz-Page filed $60,000 in liens against the Royal Nevada. In August 1955, three competing Las Vegas groups, including the Desert Inn resort, were in negotiations to take over operations at the Royal Nevada.

A new group, led by Arnold L. Kimmes, eventually agreed to take over 50 percent of the lessee corporation, after discussions with the Desert Inn failed to produce an agreement. Kimmes was a wealthy uranium mine developer from Denver, and he would have principal control of the struggling resort. He bought out the St. Louis group of leasees. Kimmes fired Rio as entertainment director, and the latter filed a $400,000 damages lawsuit, alleging that Kimmes slandered him and engaged in breach of contract. With a $100,000 attachment filed by Rio, a sheriff's deputy confiscated funds from the Royal Nevada. The case was settled in October 1955, with Rio resuming his position and returning $6,250 that was seized.

The Royal Nevada continued to struggle financially. In December 1955, stockholders invested more money into the resort and employees agreed to delay their payroll, with the hope that business would pick up during the upcoming Christmas and New Year's Eve holidays. New partners were sought to help raise $750,000, but the resort still faced money shortages. The casino closed on the night of December 31, 1955, after deputy sheriffs seized $3,900 that was owed to employees. The seize caused a panic among employees who began pocketing money from the casino. General manager Bill Miller later claimed that the Culinary Workers Union had instructed these employees to steal the money, in an effort to get the resort shut down. The union denied the allegation.

The dinner showroom closed on January 1, 1956, although musicians were hesitant to entertain because they were already owed $3,800. They agreed to perform on the condition that the dining room revenue pay their salaries. The hotel, with 250 rooms, remained opened for its existing guests several days after the rest of the resort had closed. There was insufficient food and alcohol for any other customers. A writ of attachment was filed against the resort, and items such as gaming tables and slot machines were removed. There were plans to refinance the Royal Nevada and get it reopened, although creditors filed a request to have the resort placed into bankruptcy. Among the creditors was a furniture company, and YESCO. A few days after its closing, the Royal Nevada was the target of an arson attempt, as two men placed a home-made fire bomb in a rear stairwell. Authorities moved the bomb to the parking lot and it caused no damage. Few hotel guests remained at the resort at the time.

=== Reopening ===
The hotel portion reopened on February 23, 1956, after Fishman leased it to casino investor Jake Kozloff and orchestra leader Phil Spitalny. The new management planned to eventually reopen the casino as well, although Spitalny pulled out of the resort within a few months.

In June 1956, the resort was taken over by the New Frontier resort. The Royal Nevada retained its name but became an annex to the Frontier, serving overflow guests from the latter. The Frontier leased the Royal Nevada to a group that consisted mostly of former Frontier licensees, including Kozloff. The group, led by T.W. Richardson, was approved for a gaming license in January 1957, paving the way for the reopening of the Royal Nevada's casino. One member of the group, Maurice Friedman, had to resign in order for the gaming license to get approval. Friedman later began working as the general manager for the hotel portion, after a district court judge ruled that the Clark County Licensing Board had acted inappropriately in refusing Friedman the right to work in the position.

The casino portion reopened on February 1, 1957, with 10 table games and 54 slot machines. A few months later, approximately 400 employees received checks for unpaid salary, dating back to the final weeks of December 1955.

=== Subsequent closures ===
The Nevada Gaming Control Board filed an eight-count complaint against the casino operators in November 1957, charging them with "improper operation" and other issues. The board ordered the operators to explain why their gaming license should not be revoked or suspended. It was the second major casino in Nevada history to receive such an order, after the Thunderbird resort in 1955. It was also the first major casino in Nevada to be accused of cheating; the board alleged that a card dealer had been observed on two occasions, in August 1957, of peeking at cards and dealing second cards. The board also had concerns about the casino's financing, and it suspected that people who did not qualify for a gaming license, such as Friedman, had involved themselves with the casino operations. The resort admitted partial guilt to four of the board's eight charges, including a lack of adequate funds; it owed $170,000 in debt.

The gaming board determined that it did not have enough evidence to pursue its charge of card cheating. Nevertheless, the casino was closed on December 9, 1957, because of a financial shortage. The 233-room hotel remained open, with limited bar and food service. The casino closure resulted in layoffs for 130 of the resort's 178 employees. The Nevada Tax Commission, responsible for making final decisions related to gaming, postponed its decision on whether to revoke the gaming license. A creditor committee had appealed the tax commission to let the casino operate during the final week of the year for the Christmas and New Year's Eve holidays, to help pay off the debt owed to approximately 200 creditors. Richardson borrowed $150,000 to finance the limited operation. Creditors supervised the reopening period, during which the resort attracted record crowds, convincing them to keep the casino open in 1958. Marion B. Hicks, owner of the Thunderbird, soon began negotiations to purchase the Royal Nevada from Fishman for $900,000.

However, the tax commission ordered the suspension of gaming at the resort, following a recommendation from the gaming board a month earlier. The casino closed again on January 30, 1958, despite objections from the resort's owners and creditors, leaving the latter with $98,000 in unpaid debt. Richardson sought new financing to get the casino reopened, and it was stated that Friedman would resign his position. The tax commission mandated that the casino have at least $300,000 to pay off potential winnings, and gambler Sam Baker agreed to provide a portion of the money in exchange for an 11-percent interest in the Royal Nevada. The tax commission was expected to approve the reopening in February 1958, but Baker pulled out of the deal at the last minute, for unspecified reasons. Shortly after the closing, the resort's Crown Room was used for production of a Jerry Lewis television program.

On March 5, 1958, agents of the Bureau of Internal Revenue closed the hotel portion for not paying its 1957 income taxes. The agency placed a $50,000 lien against the resort and planned to sell the furniture and fixtures to pay off the money owed. The hotel building, under separate ownership from Richardson's group, was not part of the agency's seizure. Richardson hoped to raise the necessary money to pay off the taxes. The hotel reopened a couple weeks later, after the agency sold off alcohol and other items to partially satisfy the lien. Simultaneously, Richardson and other shareholders had the Royal Nevada placed into bankruptcy reorganization, with Friedman named as temporary receiver.

=== Later years ===
In September 1958, the Desert Inn took over operations at the new Stardust resort, located just north of the Royal Nevada. The Desert Inn also leased the Royal Nevada and added 10 slot machines. In January 1959, plans were announced to join the Royal Nevada and Stardust facilities together and operate the former as a convention center, originally to be known as Stardust South. The casino, showroom, and restaurant were converted into convention space and eventually operated under the name Stardust Auditorium. It hosted most of the Stardust's larger conventions. The Royal Nevada's hotel was also rebranded as part of the Stardust complex, providing additional rooms for the latter.

As of 2001, the roadside crown sign had been placed in the Neon Museum. The former Royal Nevada hotel structure remained in operation into 2006. It was demolished in early 2007, along with the rest of the Stardust property, to make way for Echelon Place.

== Entertainment ==
In its first year, the Royal Nevada had a musical show known as Guys and Dolls, which cost $50,000 a week to put on. It also offered Dancing Waters, a fountain show accompanied by lights and music. It was performed inside the resort, with a $250,000 plumbing system installed near the stage of the Crown Room. The show used 78 tons of water each night, despite concerns about declining water levels at Lake Mead. The Royal Nevada was one of a dozen locations in the United States to host a Dancing Waters show.

The resort also hosted Phil Spitalny and his Hour of Charm Orchestra. However, Spitalny and his group were fired in December 1955, after the hotel's president determined that the orchestra was responsible for declining attendance in the Crown Room. The Las Vegas Musicians Union filed a lawsuit against the Royal Nevada, seeking $17,000 in salary for Spitalny. Deputy sheriffs raided the casino and confiscated $2,100 to help cover the amount. Spitalny was hired back shortly thereafter. Cab Calloway began his Cotton Club Revue at the resort in April 1957. Other notable performers included Anna Maria Alberghetti, Al Belletto, and Rose Marie.
