= Florence Waren =

Florence Waren (1917-2012), born Sadie Rigal, was a South African dancer who performed at the Bal Tabarin.

== Biography ==
Sadie Rigal was born in 1917.

She moved to France from South Africa in 1938, and was soon hired by the Bal Tabarin. In 1939, she was offered a place in the Ballet Russe de Monte Carlo, but World War II began before she could join.

During the occupation of Paris, the Bal Tabarin was frequented by German officers; she performed there then. Unknown to the Germans, she was Jewish, but she was still interned for several months in late 1940, as an enemy alien, because as a South African, she was a British citizen. On her release, she returned to the Bal Tabarin and paired up with Frederic Apcar to form the dancing duo "Florence et Frederic". They became famous, appearing on stage with the likes of Edith Piaf and Maurice Chevalier, while Waren at the same time aided the French Resistance. She hid fellow Jews in her apartment, helped Jews find their way from one safe house to the next, smuggled supplies and arms to the French Resistance, and, after a performance in Germany for French prisoners of war, collected letters prisoners had written to their relatives, which if discovered could have made her a prisoner. In 1944, Frederic rented a house in the suburbs to hide her and several other Jewish performers after learning she was to be arrested.

Florence married Stanley Waren in 1949, who she met performing in New York City at the Copacabana with Frederic. She then ended the dancing duo with Frederic (but trained a replacement); Frederic died in 2008. Florence stayed in New York with Stanley and appeared on the Kate Smith and Ed Sullivan shows, as well as in plays. She also choreographed shows Stanley directed in Africa, Taiwan, and China. From approximately 1973 until 1983, she was a professor of theater and dance at City College, and she led the department for part of that time. She was also a dance panelist on the New York State Council on the Arts.

She died in 2012, and her obituary was included in The Socialite who Killed a Nazi with Her Bare Hands: And 144 Other Fascinating People who Died this Year, a collection of New York Times obituaries published in 2012.

== Documentary ==
There is a documentary about her by her son Mark Waren, titled Dancing Lessons. He also made two documentaries about her friends, Romance and Resistance and The Count of Montmarte. Romance and Resistance is about Gisy Varga, a Hungarian-born nude dancer at the Bal Tabarin who had an affair with a Jewish doctor and hid him from the Nazis. The Count of Montmarte is about Mario Lembo, a gay Italian aristocrat-turned-performer and member of Josephine Baker’s touring company, who supported the resistance and aided Jews.
