= The Man Who Broke the Bank at Monte Carlo =

The Man Who Broke the Bank at Monte Carlo may refer to:

- Charles Wells (gambler), a British gambler famous for breaking the bank at Monte Carlo several times
- "The Man Who Broke the Bank at Monte Carlo" (song), a popular British music hall song inspired by Charles Wells
- The Man Who Broke the Bank at Monte Carlo (film), a 1935 film starring Ronald Colman and Joan Bennett

== See also ==
- Men who broke the bank at Monte Carlo
