= Joseph Jagger =

British businessman and gambler

Joseph Hobson Jagger
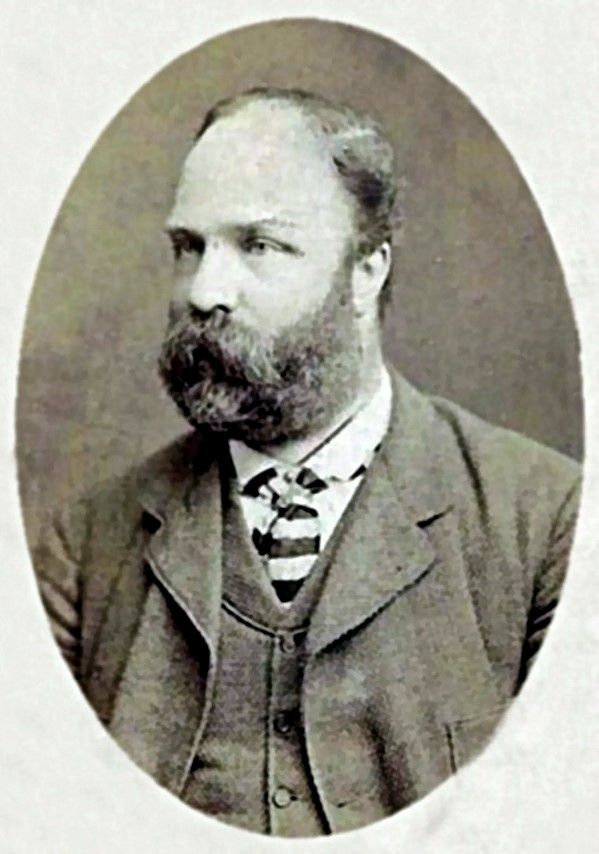
- Joseph Jagger from the collection of Anne Fletcher
- Born: Joseph Hobson Jagger; 2 September 1830; Cock Hill, Shelf, England
- Died: 25 April 1892 (aged 61)
- Occupation: Textile businessman
- Known for: "Breaking the bank at Monte Carlo"

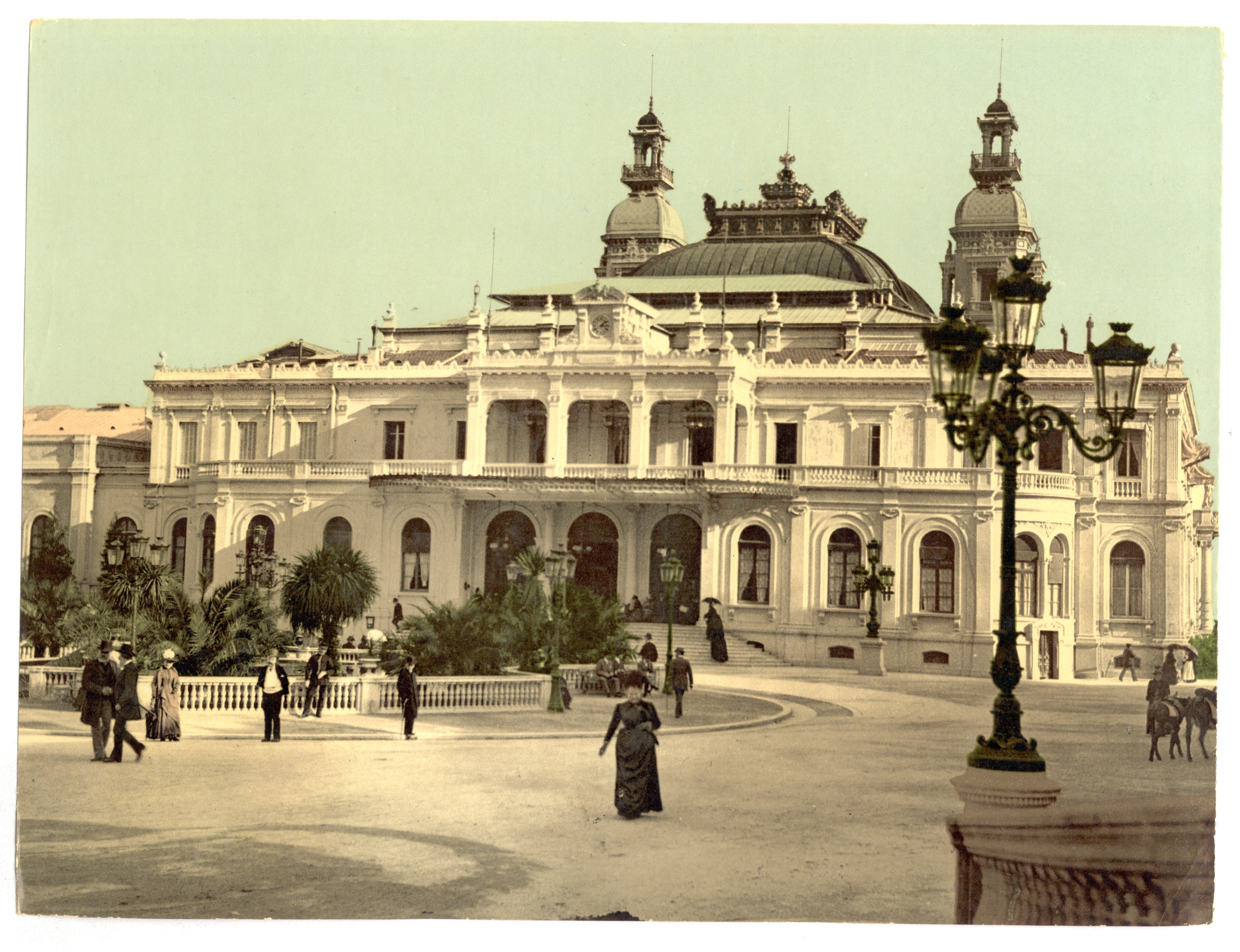
Casino de Monte-Carlo, 1890s

Joseph Hobson Jagger (2 September 1830 – 25 April 1892) was an English textile industry businessman from Yorkshire, who in around 1881 is said to have "broken the bank at Monte Carlo" by identifying and exploiting biases in the wheels of the roulette tables there. He used his winnings to buy property in Bradford. In 2018 he was the subject of a biography by his great-great niece Anne Fletcher.

== Early life and family ==
Joseph Jagger was born at Cock Hill, Shelf, Yorkshire on 2 September 1830. In his youth he worked in the textile trade in Bradford. He married Matilda with whom he had two sons and two daughters.

== Monte Carlo ==
In the 1871 census, Jagger was described as a "piece worker". He set up his own textile business but it failed and he was faced with bankruptcy and four children to support. Around 1880/81 he and his eldest son Alfred, with his nephew Oates Jagger, travelled to Monte Carlo with money borrowed from friends and family. Having worked in the textile industry, Jagger may have observed that spinning wheels were never perfectly balanced and always had some form of bias, and it is thought that Jagger hit on the idea of using this bias to win at roulette.

After studying the tables at the Casino de Monte-Carlo for a month to determine which numbers came up most frequently he began to place successful bets. Jagger is reputed to have won over 2 million francs over several days, the equivalent of £80,000 at the time and, according to The Times, worth £7.5 million in 2018. The expression "breaking the bank" is used when a gambler wins more money than the reserve held at that particular table in the casino. At the start of each day, every table was funded with a cash reserve of 100,000 francs – known as "the bank". If this reserve was insufficient to pay the winnings, play at that table was suspended while extra funds were brought out from the casino's vaults. In a ceremony devised by François Blanc, the original owner of the casino, a black cloth was laid over the table in question, and the successful player was said to have broken the bank. After an interval the table re-opened and play continued.

The manufacturers of the roulette tables later introduced movable partitions into their tables to frustrate Jagger's method. On his return to Yorkshire, Jagger used some of the money to purchase houses in Little Horton, Bradford, that were occupied by members of his family.

== Death and legacy ==
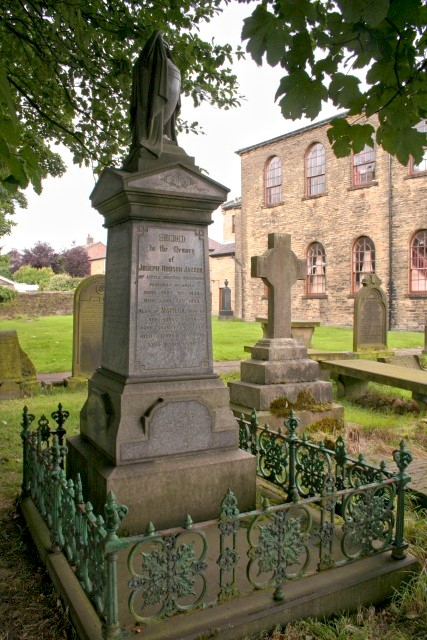
Jagger family grave at Bethel Chapel, Shelf.

Jagger died on 25 April 1892, according to Brewers Dictionary of Phrase and Fable, "probably mainly from boredom", however, his death certificate gives diabetes as the cause. His address at the time was 25 Greaves Street, Little Horton, and he left an estate of £2,081 (equivalent to £286,000 in 2023). Probate was granted to Alfred Jagger, cashier, Sidney Sowood, warehouseman, and Oates Jagger, gentleman. He was described as a "manufacturer". He was buried in the family grave at the Methodist Bethel Chapel in Shelf, Halifax.

He is incorrectly described by Brewers as the inspiration for Fred Gilbert's song "The Man Who Broke the Bank at Monte Carlo", first performed around the early 1890s; however, the song is thought to have actually been written about the gambler and fraudster Charles Wells. He is the subject of a biography by his great-great niece Anne Fletcher titled From the Mill to Monte Carlo: The Working-Class Englishman Who Beat the Monaco Casino and Changed Gambling Forever, published by Amberley in 2018.

== See also ==
- Men who broke the bank at Monte Carlo
