= Harry Buxton Forman =

British writer (1842–1917)

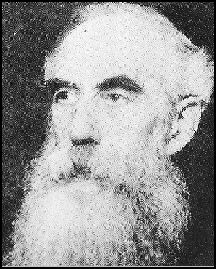
- Born: 11 July 1842; Camberwell, London
- Died: 15 June 1917 (aged 74); St. John's Wood, London
- Occupations: antiquarian, book collector, bibliographer, poet, civil servant
- Spouse: Laura Sellé
- Children: 3

Henry Buxton Forman CB (11 July 1842 – 15 June 1917) was a Victorian-era bibliographer and antiquarian bookseller whose literary reputation is based on his bibliographies of Percy Shelley and John Keats. In 1934 he was revealed to have been in a conspiracy with Thomas James Wise (1859–1937) to purvey large quantities of forged first editions of Georgian and Victorian authors.

== Early life ==
Henry Buxton Forman was born in Camberwell, south London on 11 July 1842, the third son of George Ellery Forman (born Plymouth in 1800, died London in 1869), a retired Royal Naval surgeon and his Rotherhithe born wife Maria Courthope. At the age of ten months his family moved to Teignmouth in Devon and he was educated at a Royal Naval School in New Cross where Edmund Gosse was a contemporary and lifelong acquaintance although not an intimate. Whilst at school he adapted the sobriquet Harry by which he was afterwards known. He returned to London in 1860 and lived with his brothers (Note: His older brother Alfred William Forman, later a published poet was the first person to translate into English the librettos of several Richard Wagner's operas including Der Ring des Nibelungen(1877), Tristan und Isolde (1891), Parsifal (1899), and Tannhäuser (1919). He married the actress Alma Murray in 1876) in Stockwell in south London after joining the Post Office at 18 years of age.

== Career as a civil servant ==
Harry Buxton Forman pursued a successful career in the Post Office starting as supplementary class clerk in the Secretary's Office at St.Martin's-le-Grand in April 1860. He served as acting surveyor of British Post Offices in the Mediterranean in 1883 and thereafter served as principal clerk from 1885 and second secretary advancing to controller of the packet services. In 1897 he received the CB for his services to the Post Office retiring in 1907 after 47 years' service. He attended as a representative of the United Kingdom four Postal Union Congresses – at Paris in 1880, at Lisbon in 1885, at Vienna in 1891, and at Washington in 1897. He was one of the earliest workers on behalf of the Post Office Library and Literary Association, and was its secretary for several years.

== Editor of Shelley and Keats ==
It is as an authority on the lives and works of Percy Shelley and John Keats that Forman is largely remembered. His literary endeavours began in 1869 with a series of anonymous articles in William Tinsley's eponymous Tinsley's Magazine later reprinted in 1871 as Our Living Poets. This resulted in a friendly relationship with Dante Gabriel Rossetti and a fateful encounter with another poet Richard Hengist Horne, the subject of an early known forgery. This success resulted in regular articles for the London Quarterly Review and a series of articles including four on Ibsen in 1872.

Buxton Forman became interested in the philosophy of free thinking as expounded in the works of Auguste Comte (1798–1857) and he met his wife Laura Sellé, the daughter of the musician Dr William Christian Sellé at a positivist lecture also attended by George Eliot with whom he became acquainted. Many positivists looked to Shelley and Keats as examples of free thinking and in 1876 Buxton Forman published an edition of the Poetical Works of Shelley, followed in 1880 by Shelley's Prose Works. In 1878 he edited the Letters of John Keats to Fanny Brawne, and in 1883 the Poetical Works and Other Writings of John Keats which ran to five volumes. He proved a gifted textual editor although the criticism he printed included much that is trivial. He also contributed to the study of Shelley with an uncompleted Shelley Library that included a number of first editions and rare writings (as well as a number of his own passed-off forgeries). Other Shelley-related material included an Essay in Bibliography in 1886, the Letters of Edward John Trelawny (1910), and Thomas Medwin's Life of Shelley, the latter work being scrupulously re-edited to remove many of Medwin's inexactitudes.

He followed up his edition of Keats' poetic works with Three essays by John Keats (1889), Poetry and Prose by John Keats: a book of fresh verses and new readings (1890), and a one-volume edition of the Poetical Works of John Keats (1906). He took an active interest in the purchase and establishment of the Keats and Shelley House in Rome, and presented to it a large number of his books.

His passion for Shelley and Keats resulted in collaborative work with others and articles on a number of minor poets such as Thomas Wade and Charles Jeremiah Wells. He contributed articles on Wade and Horne and verses of his own in W R Nicoll and T J Wise's Literary Anecdotes of the 19th Century (1805–1896) and for A H Miles's Poets and Poetry of the 19th Century Forman made and prefaced the selections from Wade, Wells, Horne, and William Morris.

== Literary forgeries ==
In 1887 an association with a London commodity broker and book collector Thomas James Wise saw the first of many illegal printings by Wise and Buxton Forman. The origins began in November 1886 when Edward Dowden published a biography of Shelley. It printed a considerable number of poems for the first time that Forman and Wise decided to print separately as Poems and Sonnets inventing the Philadelphia Historical Society as a cover. It was the start of a full scale conspiracy with numerous forgeries over the next fifteen years that were printed in London with templates that stated otherwise. They specialised in early pamphlets, supposedly privately published, of poets some of whom such as Rossetti and Swinburne were still living. Many of the forgeries were printed by the firm of Richard Clay & Sons who had printed legitimate facsimile issues of works by Robert Browning and Percy Shelley. These were "creative forgeries" in that they were not copies of works that existed but were presented as works that could or should have existed. Dates, places of publication, publishers (as distinct from printers) led the collecting world to believe in the 'rare private' editions. Buxton Forman and Wise forged publications by: Elizabeth Barrett Browning, George Eliot, John Ruskin, Matthew Arnold, Alfred Tennyson, George Meredith and William Thackeray and many others. Many of these forgeries were sold by Buxton Forman [though there is little published evidence of sales] and Wise to collectors across the English speaking world and it would be forty years later that their fraud would be discovered by John Carter. The extent of the forgeries was such that the Brayton Ives sale in New York in 1915 contained twenty-four forgeries, for example.

== Elizabeth Barrett Browning and the Reading Sonnets ==
Forman and Wise's most famous forgery is of the Sonnets from the Portuguese by Elizabeth Barrett Browning, a lifelong literary passion of Buxton Forman (that bore fruit in editorship by Forman of Aurora Leigh and Elizabeth Barrett Browning and her Scarcer Books in 1896), but apparently not deep enough to stop him from tampering with the most celebrated literary love story of Victorian England. The sonnets were written by Elizabeth Barrett to Robert Browning during their courtship. Their polish and intensity were of lasting literary interest. The first appearance of the poems was in the second edition of Elizabeth's Poems in 1850. However in 1894 an earlier 1847 private edition began to appear in literary journals. This originated from Forman and Wise and was printed in London (although it had a Reading frontispiece) by the firm of Richard Clay and Sons. The Reading Sonnets proved to be a vulnerable point of the conspiracy when the fraud was exposed in 1934.

== Final years ==
Forman was seriously ill in 1906 with an undisclosed malady and he retired from the Post Office in 1907. He no longer wished to continue his illegal partnership with Thomas Wise, but was in too deep to disassociate from him completely. He had several literary projects to occupy him. He published Letters of Edward John Trelawny in 1910. He transcribed the Shelley Note Books from twenty-five notebooks inherited by Sir Percy Shelley from his mother. This was a prodigious exercise in patient and meticulous transcription. Most of the notebooks ended up being sold to American collectors, a striking indication of the popularity of Shelley at the turn of the twentieth century in the USA. His last book was The Life of Percy Bysshe Shelley by Thomas Medwin, a new edition that Medwin had extended but left unpublished. The frontispiece portrait of Shelley is in fact a copy of Leonardo da Vinci's Head of Christ with slight alterations.

Forman died after a long illness on 15 June 1917 and his ashes were sprinkled on the River Teign, which flows near his Devon childhood home. He left his funeral instructions in a published verse:

Let the prison'd litch-fire batten on the tissues
Leaving naught but ashes, clean and grey and pure
Gather, friends, the handful that from the furnace issues,
Cushion them in crane-bill, and bear them to the Moor.
Ashes of her poet, bear them to one land,
Take them up to Dartmoor and strow them through his own land,
Rush them through the harbour and lose them in the Main!

== Exposure as a forger ==
The exposure of Harry Buxton Forman as a forger in 1934 was driven by two booksellers, Graham Pollard and John Carter. They became suspicious of Browning's "Reading Sonnets," and began to gather more and more evidence that the pamphlet was not as it purported to be. Chemical analysis of the paper showed that it contained a chemically constituted wood pulp, a process that was not used in England before 1874. In addition, the typeface in minor respects indicated a late 19th Century use, and via some sterling detective work Carter and Pollard traced the printing to Richard Clay and Sons. In turn this led to further investigation into various publications being offered for sale by Herbert Gorfin, a prominent bookseller. When it became apparent that Gorfin knew nothing of the forgeries, Pollard and Carter persuaded him to expose the source of the publications. Thus Thomas Wise and Harry Buxton Forman were outed as literary forgers. Pollard and Carter published their findings in 1934 in An Enquiry into the Nature of Certain Nineteenth Century Pamphlets.

== Forman bibliography (selected) ==
- Our Living Poets, Tinsley’s Magazine articles, London (1869)
- Our Living Poets: An Essay in Criticism, Tinsley, London (1871)
- Poetical works of Shelley, edited by H Buxton Forman (1880)
- Prose Works of Shelley, edited by H Buxton Forman (1880)
- Letters of John Keats to Fanny Brawne, (1878)
- Poetical Works and Other & Writings of John Keats (1883)
- An Essay in Bibliography (1886)
- Three Essays by John Keats (1889),
- Poetry and Prose by John Keats: a book of fresh verses and new readings (1890)
- Sir Stevenson Arthur Blackwood (1893)
- The Building of the Idylls; a Study in Tennyson (1896)
- Elizabeth Barrett Browning and her scarcer books (1896)
- The Books of William Morris, edited by H. Buxton Forman (1897)
- The Life Poetic by William Morris (1897)
- Sordello, Robert Browning (1902)
- Poetical Works of John Keats (1906)
- Letters of Edward John Trelawny, edited by H.Buxton Forman, OUP (1910)
- Note Books of Percy Bysshe Shelley (1911)
- Life of Shelley, Thomas Medwin, edited by H. Buxton Forman. OUP, (1913)
- Hitherto Unpublished Poems and Stories by Elizabeth Barrett Browning (1914)

== Biography ==
- Collins, John (1992). The Two Forgers: A Biography of Harry Buxton Forman and Thomas James Wise. New Castle, Delaware, USA: Oak Knoll Press. ISBN 0-938768-29-8.
