= The Man Who Broke the Bank at Monte Carlo (film) =

1935 film by Stephen Roberts

- Theatrical poster
- Directed by: Stephen Roberts
- Written by: Nunnally Johnson; Howard Smith
- Based on: a play by Ilya Surgutchoff and Frederick Albert Swan
- Produced by: Darryl F. Zanuck; Nunnally Johnson (associate producer)
- Starring: Ronald Colman; Joan Bennett; Colin Clive
- Cinematography: Ernest Palmer
- Edited by: Harold Schuster
- Music by: Oscar Bradley
- Production company: 20th Century Pictures
- Distributed by: 20th Century Fox
- Release date: November 14, 1935
- Running time: 71 minutes
- Country: United States
- Language: English

The Man Who Broke the Bank at Monte Carlo is a 1935 American romantic comedy film made by 20th Century Fox. It was directed by Stephen Roberts, and starred Ronald Colman, Joan Bennett, and Colin Clive. The screenplay was written by Nunnally Johnson and Howard Smith, based on a play by Ilya Surgutchoff and Frederick Albert Swan. The film was inspired by the song of the same name popularised by Charles Coborn.

== Plot ==
In Monte Carlo, Paul Gaillard, an impoverished Russian exiled aristocrat, has a run of good luck, breaking the bank at the baccarat table. His winnings, ten million francs, are so vast he needs a suitcase to carry away the banknotes. The management tries to entice him to stay, placing various signs of good luck including four-leaf clovers, a horseshoe, and a hunchback in his path, to no avail. Paul is quoted in the newspapers advising people to stay away from Monte Carlo.

On the train, Paul encounters Helen Berkeley when they share a table in the dining car. He overhears her and her male companion talking about Switzerland. In Paris, he goes to the Cafe Russe, where he shares the money with the staff. They scrimped and saved for ten years to build up their initial stake.

The next day, Paul and his servant Ivan take the train to Interlaken, Switzerland. Helen is mistakenly placed in Paul's compartment. He takes the opportunity to try to charm her, but is rebuffed. He is delighted, however, to learn that the man with her is her brother Bertrand. Paul pursues her with great persistence, and it finally pays off. They spend time together.

Then Helen confides that she is unhappy because she is going to marry a 63-year-old for money, not for herself, but for her brother, who needs 5 million francs. Paul offers her nearly 4 million, his share of the winnings. She does not accept, but asks him to spend a week with her in Monte Carlo. He agrees. It turns out she is a back street music hall performer who was hired to lure him back, but she cannot go through with it, having fallen in love with him. Too ashamed to face Paul again, she secretly departs for Paris. When he discovers she has vanished, he makes a bargain with her brother: he will get the money Bertrand supposedly needs desperately in return for his sister's location. Bertrand lies and tells him that she went to Monte Carlo. Helen runs into Bertrand at the train station and learns what he has done. She rushes to Monte Carlo.

Paul returns to the baccarat table. When Helen enters the club to try to stop him, she is intercepted by the management and kept a virtual prisoner. Paul loses nearly all his money, but then his luck changes and he goes on another winning streak, and he is on the verge of breaking the bank again before he loses everything on the last bet. When Paul leaves, he sees Helen and Bertrand emerge from the manager's office; he congratulates them. He returns to work driving a taxi.

Paul takes a fare to a nightclub where Helen is performing. He dons his black tie and tails and goes inside. He dances one dance with Helen and pretends to still be fairly well off, before driving away. Helen chases after him in another taxi, finally catching up with him at the Cafe Russe. When she discovers he is the driver, not a passenger, she is ecstatic. Now that he is poor, she can tell him that she loves him. They embrace. He takes her inside the closed Cafe Russe, where he and the staff, Russian nobility like him, are privately celebrating the late Czar Nicholas II's birthday.

== Cast ==
- Ronald Colman as Paul Gaillard
- Joan Bennett as Helen Berkeley
- Colin Clive as Bertrand Berkeley
- Nigel Bruce as Ivan
- Montagu Love as Director
- Frank Reicher as 2nd Asst. Director
- Lionel Pape as 3rd Asst. Director
- Ferdinand Gottschalk as Office Man
- Andre Cheron as Dealer
- Lynn Bari as Flower Girl (uncredited)
- John Carradine as Despondent Casino Gambler (uncredited)
- E. E. Clive as Waiter (uncredited)
- Dennis O'Keefe as Onlooker at Casino (uncredited)

== Reception ==
Andre Sennwald, critic for The New York Times, was unimpressed, writing, "Commonplace in its plot workings and meager in gayety, the film misuses a promising comic idea." While he appreciated the performances of Colman, Clive and Bruce, he found that "Miss Bennett, to put it politely, is pretty badly miscast, her wooden charm and vocal monotony having almost nothing to do with the lady of mystery that she is pretending to be."

Writing for The Spectator in 1936, Graham Greene gave the film a tepid review, describing it as "a mildly agreeable comedy", and characterizing Ronald Colman as "an excellent director's dummy" and "an almost perfect actor for the fictional screen". Green's criticism of the film came mainly from the plotline involving the White Russians. According to Green, "I can never appreciate the pathos of princes who have become taxi-drivers and drink coffee essence instead of champagne; unlike other taxi-drivers they have had their champagne".

== Copyright case ==
After the film was released, the publisher of the song sued the studio in Francis, Day & Hunter Ltd v Twentieth Century Fox Corp in the Supreme Court of Ontario, Canada, over the copyright. After two appeals, the publisher lost on all counts.

== See also ==
- Charles Wells, the inspiration for the song "The Man Who Broke the Bank at Monte Carlo"
- Men who broke the bank at Monte Carlo
