= Fred Gilbert =

Fred Gilbert may refer to:

- Fred Gilbert (songwriter), English theatrical agent and writer of music hall songs
- Fred Gilbert (rugby league), Australian rugby league player

== See also ==
- Frederick Gilbert, English international rugby union player
- Freddie Gilbert (born 1962), American football player
