= Willie Rouse =

British entertainer and pioneer radio broadcaster

William Thomas Rouse (8 July 1877 – 22 December 1928), sometimes known as "Wireless Willie", was a British entertainer and pioneer radio broadcaster.

He was born in London. He worked as a music hall entertainer and pianist from the 1890s, and toured the country. He also worked as an agent, and as a radio announcer. He was one of the first comic entertainers to broadcast in Britain, appearing regularly from 1924 on BBC radio performing comic songs and patter and billed as "Alleged Humour at the Piano".

As "Wireless Willie", he also compered early radio programmes of music hall acts, including Veterans of Variety which featured Gus Elen, Vesta Victoria, Charles Coborn, and Vesta Tilley, among others.

== Death ==
He died, aged 51, in Whitstable, Kent, in 1928.
