= Francis, Day & Hunter Ltd v Twentieth Century Fox Corp =

- Court: Judicial Committee of the Privy Council
- Full case name: Francis Day & Hunter Limited v Twentieth Century Fox Corporation Limited and others
- Decided: 12 October 1939
- Citation: [1939] UKPC 68, [1940] AC 112, [1939] 4 DLR 353

Case history
- Appealed from: Supreme Court of Ontario (Appellate Division)

Court membership
- Judges sitting: Lord Thankerton, Lord Russell of Killowen, Lord Wright, Lord Romer, Sir Lyman Poore Duff

Case opinions
- Decision by: Lord Wright

Francis, Day & Hunter Ltd v Twentieth Century Fox Corp is a leading Judicial Committee of the Privy Council opinion on copyright law.

== Background ==
In 1892, Francis, Day and Hunter had released a song titled "The Man who Broke the Bank at Monte Carlo", which was written and composed by Fred Gilbert. It acquired copyright under the Copyright Act 1842, but failed to acquire the parallel performing right under the Copyright (Musical Compositions) Act 1882 because the published copies lacked a notice of reservation of such right.

Gilbert died intestate in 1903, at which time British copyright law stated that copyright in his works would lapse in 1934. However, the Copyright Act 1911 extended it until the end of 1953.

In 1935, 20th Century Fox released the film The Man Who Broke the Bank at Monte Carlo, which (other than the title) had no other connection to the song. As it was exhibited in various theatres in Canada, Francis sued in the Supreme Court of Ontario for infringement of copyright by performance in public, infringement of the literary copyright, and for passing off.

== The courts below ==
At trial, McEvoy J found against Francis on the issue of the performing right, but found in their favour on the question of the "title and theme" of the musical work. The question of passing off did not arise.

On appeal, Middleton JA of the Appellate Division agreed with McEvoy J on the first issue, reversed his judgment on the second, and further held that there was no passing off.

Francis appealed the ruling to the Privy Council.

== At the Privy Council ==
The Board rejected the appeal, agreeing with the Ontario courts on all counts. In his ruling, Lord Wright stated the following:

- The question of performing right failed in law, because of the lacking reservation notice required under UK copyright law, which extended to Canada at that time. It also failed in fact, because neither the song nor the music was performed in the film.
- The claim of literary infringement failed, because the only copying was in the use of the title, and that was too insubstantial in the facts of the case to constitute infringement. A name alone cannot possess copyright unless it is sufficiently original and distinctive. "To break the bank" is a hackneyed expression, and Monte Carlo is or was the most obvious place at which that achievement or accident might take place."
- Passing off did not take place in this case, as a person seeing the film was not likely to expect to hear the song. "The thing said to be passed off must resemble the thing for which it is passed off. A frying pan cannot be passed off as a kettle."

== Similar cases ==
- in Australia – John Brodel v Telstra Corporation [2004] FCA 505 (26 April 2004)
- in England and Wales – Dick v Yates (1881) 18 Ch D 76
