= Don Johnson (gambler) =

American blackjack player (born 1962)

- Born: Donald Johnson; May 10, 1962 (age 63); Salem, Oregon
- Occupations: Corporate executive Blackjack player

Don Johnson (born 1962) is a professional blackjack hustler and former corporate executive who beat Atlantic City casinos for over $15 million during a six-month period in 2011.

== Gambling ==
At age 30, Johnson was hired to manage Philadelphia Park, a racetrack that evolved into the Parx Casino. After managing that and other racetracks, he served as a state regulator in Oregon, Idaho, Texas, and Wyoming. In the early 2000s, he founded Heritage Development, a Wyoming-based company that uses computer-assisted wagering programs for horse racing.

During the 2008 financial crisis, casinos became desperate to entice high rollers. In 2010, Johnson was offered to play at the highest stakes. He negotiated several changes to standard casino blackjack to gain a mathematical edge. These changes included dealers being forced to stay on soft 17, a 20% rebate where casino would refund 20% of his losses (20 cents to every dollar) for losses exceeding $500,000, six decks, re-split aces, and others.

During a 12-hour marathon at the Tropicana, Johnson recalls three consecutive hands where he won $1.2 million, including one hand where he profited $800,000. Johnson bet $100,000 and was dealt two eights, which he split. Surprisingly, another two eights came, and he split again, wagering $400,000. He was then dealt a three, a two, another three, and another two on the four hands, allowing him to double down on each hand. He was now wagering a total of $800,000. The dealer busted, and Johnson ended up winning $800,000.

Under these conditions, Johnson was able to beat Tropicana out of nearly $6 million, Borgata out of $5 million, and Caesars out of $4 million. His total profits neared $15.1 million and seriously hurt casino profits. Though he was not banned from Tropicana and Borgata, the two casinos stopped Johnson from playing under those conditions and limits, while Caesars effectively banned him from playing.
