= Monte Carlo Casino =

Casino in Monte Carlo, Monaco

- Casino de Monte-Carlo (French)

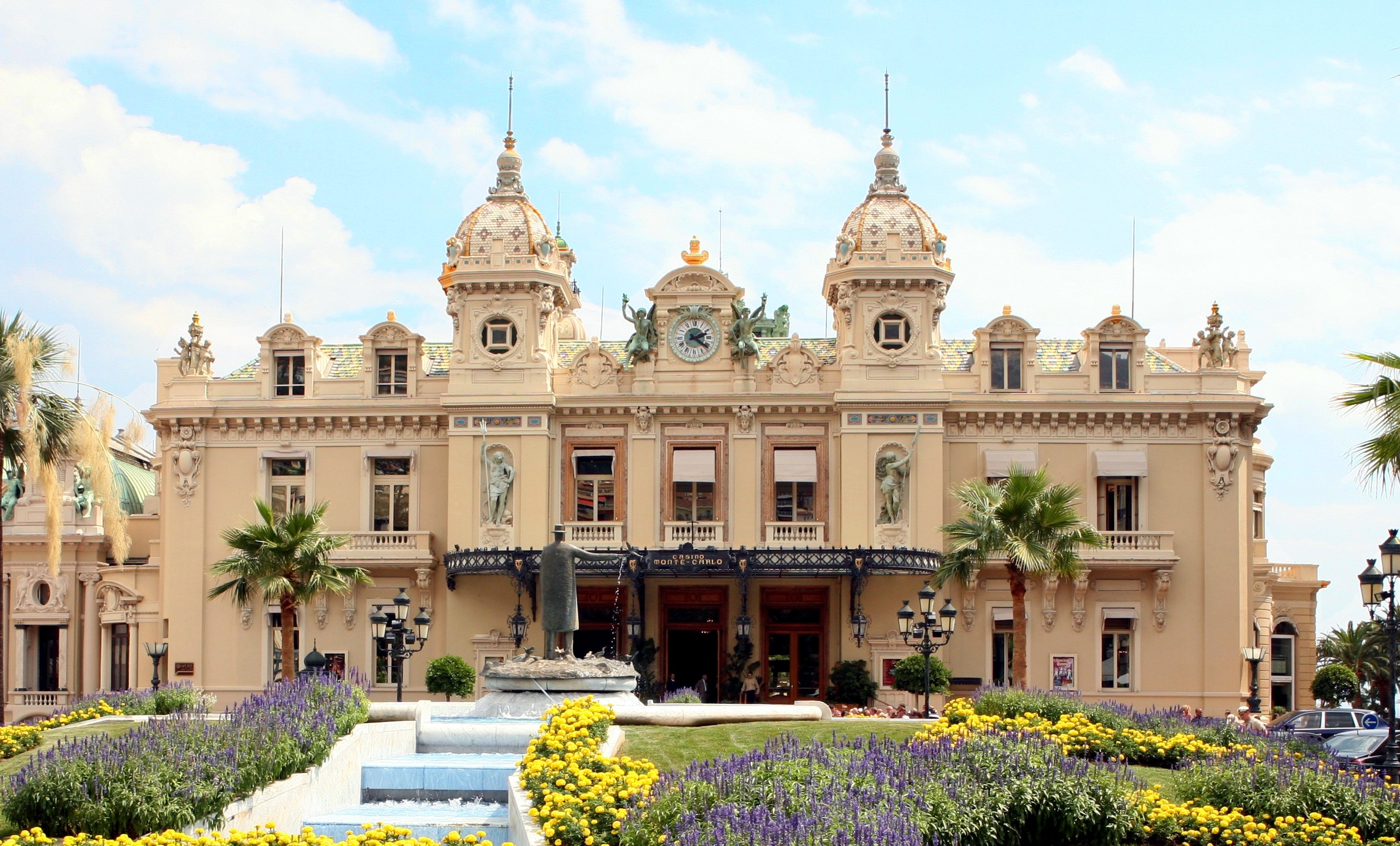
- Front view of Casino de Monte-Carlo
- Interactive map of Monte Carlo Casino
- Location: Place du Casino Monte Carlo, Monaco; 43°44′22″N 7°25′44″E
- Opened: July 1865; 161 years ago
- No. of rooms: 6
- Notable restaurants: Le Louis XV, Le Salon Rose, Le Train Bleu
- Casino type: Land-based
- Owner: Société des Bains de Mer
- Public transit access: Place du Casino, CAM lines 1, 5, and 6 Monaco-Monte Carlo station Nice Côte d'Azur Airport
- Website: www.montecarlosbm.com/en

The Monte Carlo Casino, officially named Casino de Monte-Carlo, is a gambling and entertainment complex located in Monaco. It includes a casino, the Opéra de Monte-Carlo, and the office of Les Ballets de Monte-Carlo.

The Casino de Monte-Carlo is owned and operated by the Société des Bains de Mer (SBM), a public company in which the government of Monaco and the ruling princely family have a majority interest. The company also owns the principal hotels, sports clubs, foodservice establishments, and nightclubs throughout the Principality.

Citizens of Monaco are forbidden to enter the gaming rooms of the casino. The rule banning all Monégasques from gambling or working at the casino was an initiative of Princess Caroline, the de facto regent of Monaco, who amended the rules on moral grounds.

== History ==
The idea of opening a gambling casino in Monaco originated with Princess Caroline, the shrewd, business-minded spouse of Prince Florestan. Revenues from the proposed venture were supposed to save the House of Grimaldi from bankruptcy. The ruling family's persistent financial problems became especially acute after the loss of tax revenue from two breakaway towns, Menton and Roquebrune, which declared independence from Monaco in 1848 and refused to pay taxes on olive oil and fruit imposed by the Grimaldis.

In 1854, Charles, Florestan's son and future Prince of Monaco, recruited a team of Frenchmen (writer Albert Aubert and businessman Napoleon Langlois) to devise a development plan and write a prospectus to attract 4 million francs needed to build a spa for the treatment of various diseases, a gambling casino modeled on the Bad Homburg casino, and English-style villas. Granted a concession of 30 years to operate a bathing establishment and gaming tables, Aubert and Langlois opened the first casino on 14 December 1856 in Villa Bellevu. Intended to be only a temporary location, the building was a modest mansion in La Condamine.

In the late 1850s, Monaco was an unlikely place for a resort to succeed. The lack of roads needed to connect Monaco to Nice and the rest of Europe, and the absence of comfortable accommodations for visitors, as well as the concessionaires' failure to publicize the new resort, resulted in far fewer customers than was originally anticipated. Unable to raise the capital needed to operate the money-losing enterprise, Aubert and Langlois ceded their rights to Frossard de Lilbonne, who in turn passed it to Pierre Auguste Daval in 1857.

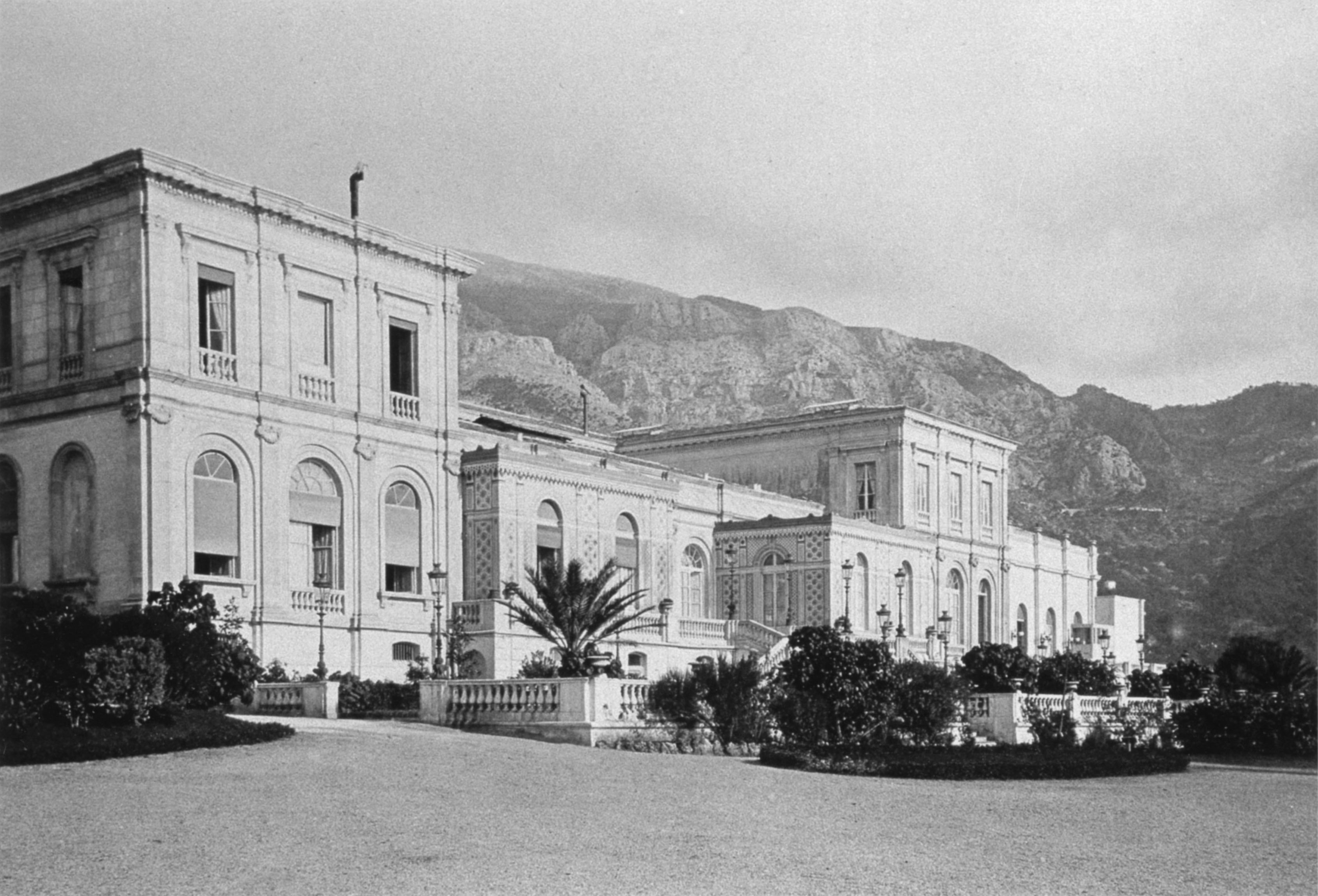
Seaside facade before 1878

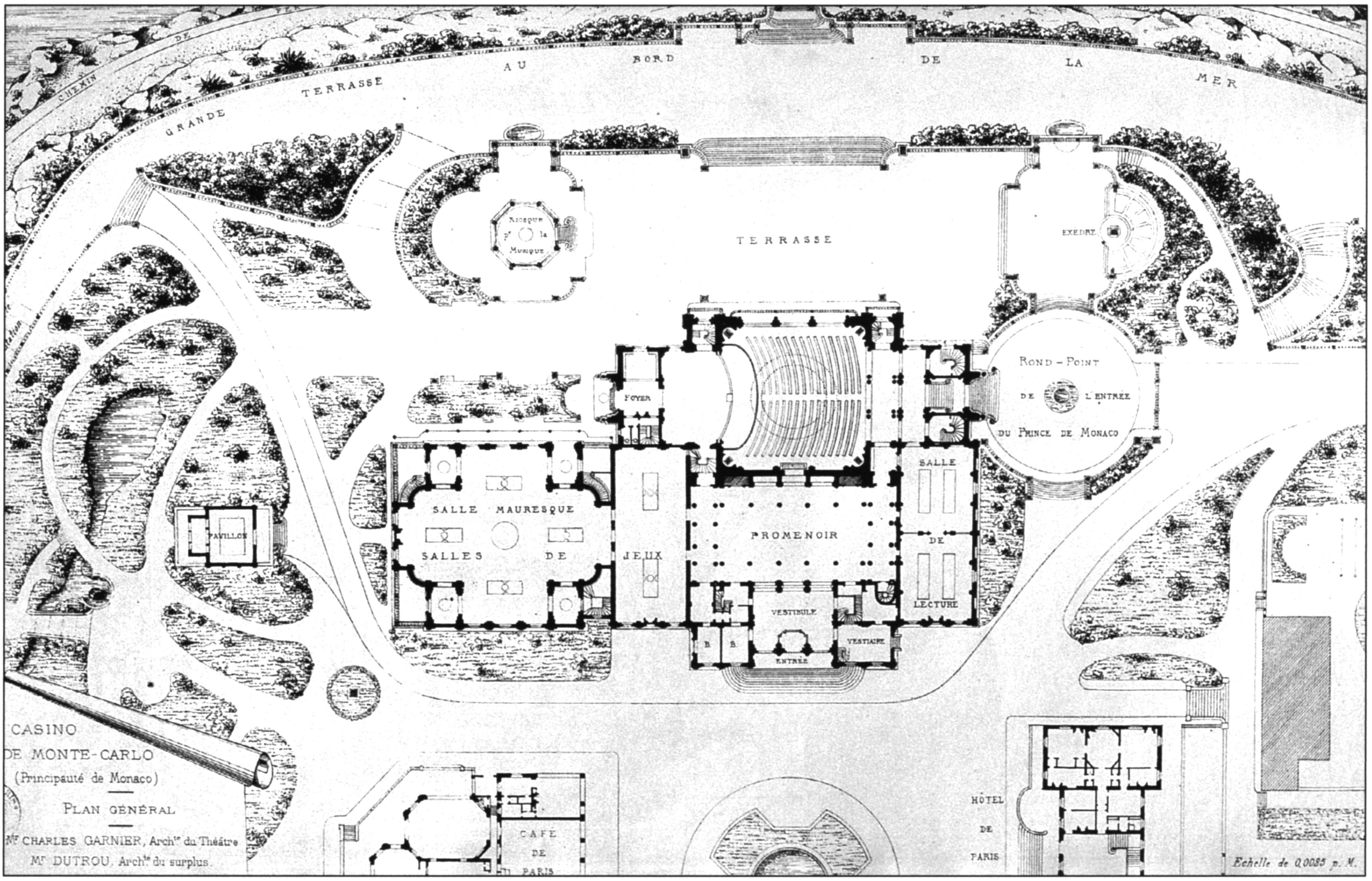
General plan by Garnier and Dutrou, 1879

During this initial period, the casino had been moved several times, until it finally ended up in the area called Les Spelugues (English: The Caves). Construction at this site began on 13 May 1858 to designs of the Parisian architect Gobineau de la Bretonnerie and was completed in 1863. Gobineau de la Bretonnerie also designed the neighboring Hôtel de Paris Monte-Carlo (constructed in 1862).

Although the casino began to make a profit in 1859, Daval was not up to the task. Just like his predecessors, he was incompetent and lacked the ability to bring the gambling enterprise to the scale envisioned by Princess Caroline. Frustrated, she dispatched her private secretary M. Eyneaud to Germany, hoping to recruit François Blanc, a French entrepreneur and operator of the Bad Homburg casino. Blanc initially declined the offer, and it took a lot of time and persuasion on the part of Princess Caroline to convince him to move to Monaco. Princess Caroline even appealed to Madame Blanc, whom she befriended during her first visit to Bad Homburg, with a suggestion that Monaco's mild climate would be good for Madame Blanc's ill health.

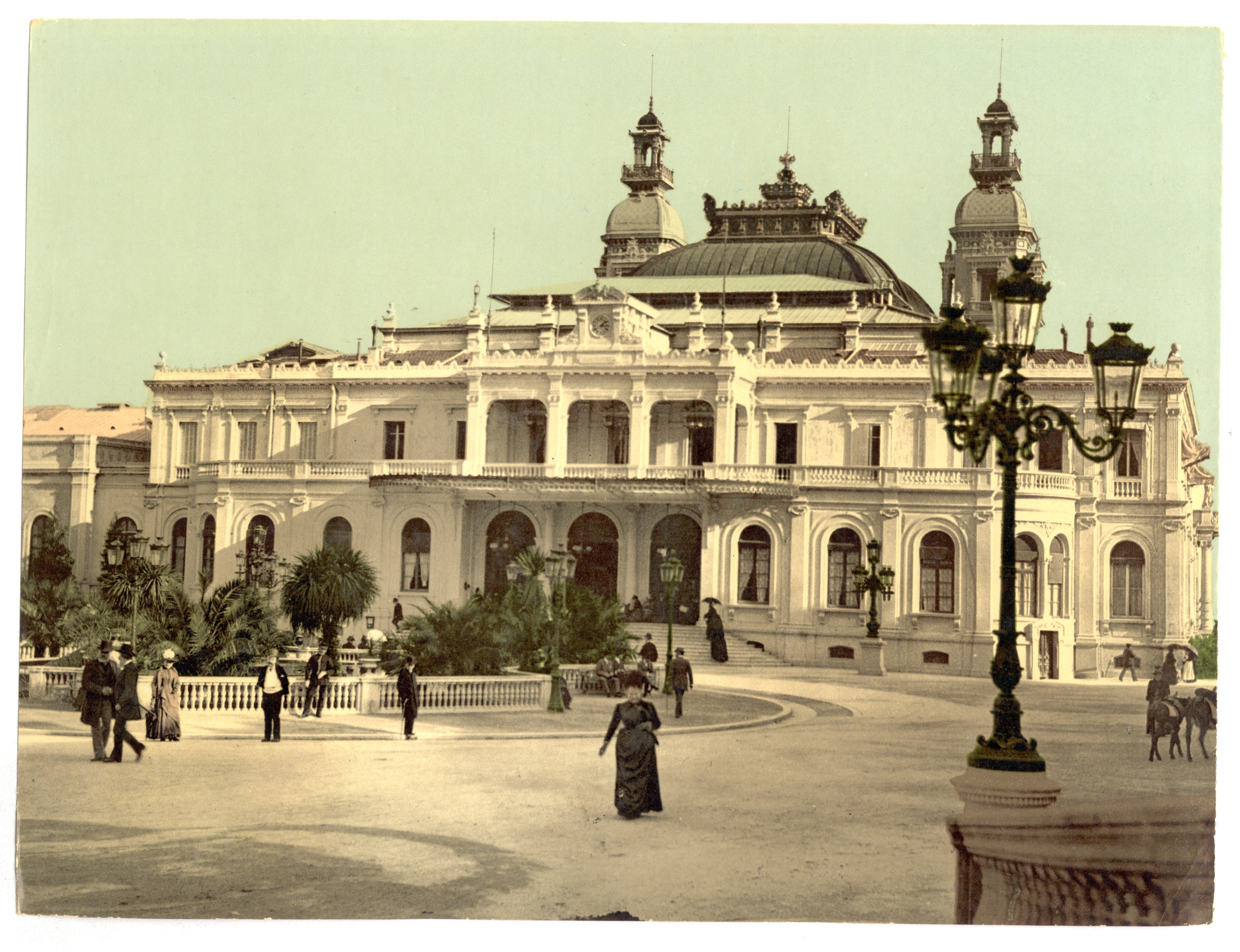
Facade on the Place du Casino after the expansion of 1878–79

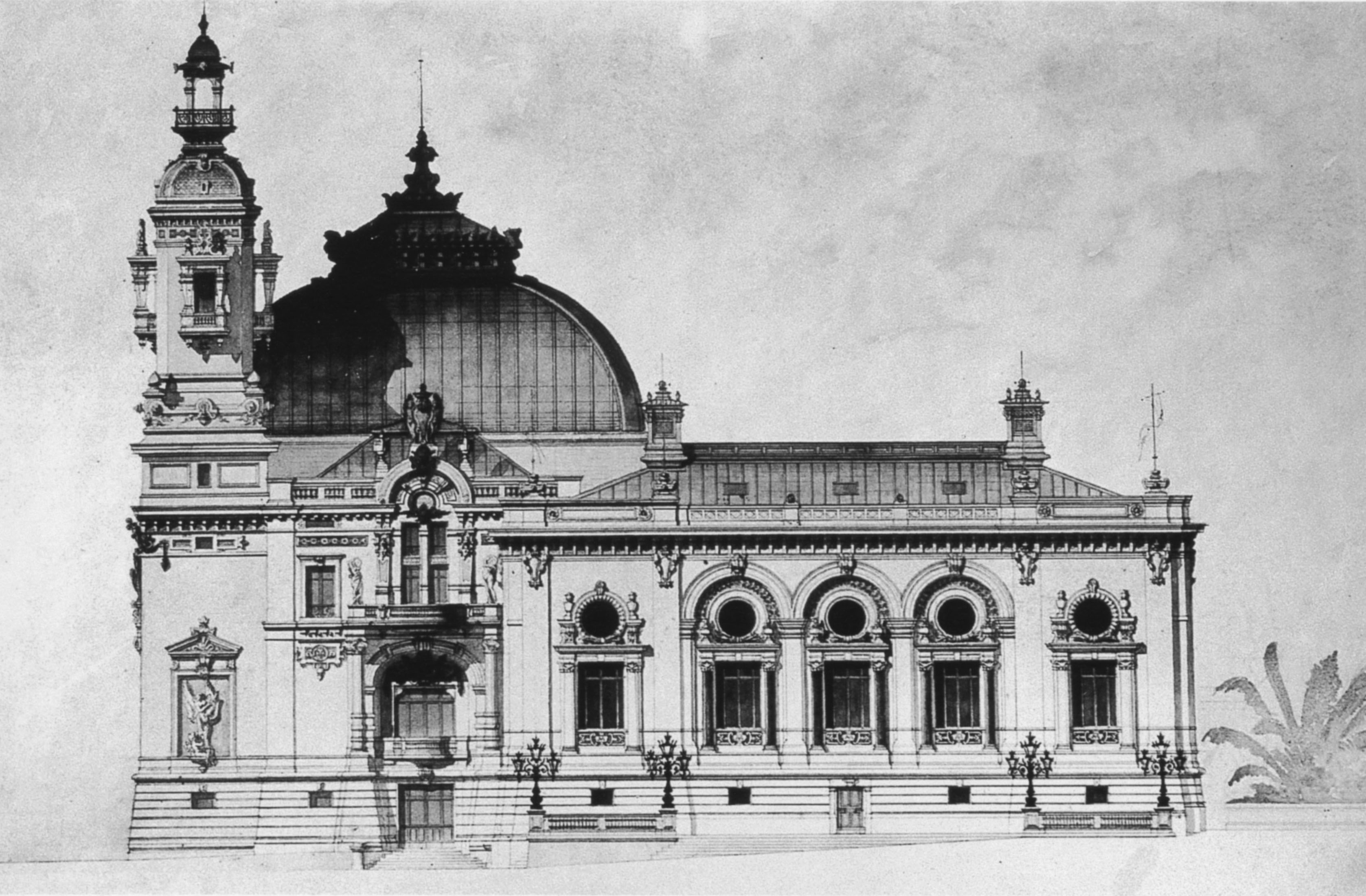
Eastern elevation (c. 1878–80) of the Trente-Quarante Gaming Room with the theatre to the left and behind

In 1863, François Blanc finally agreed to take over Monaco's casino business. To manage the new venture, a company (the Société des Bains de Mer et du Cercle des Etrangers) was formed with capital of 15 million francs. Blanc became the majority stockholder in the company and received a 50-year concession, which would last until 1913. Blanc used his connections to quickly raise the required capital and begin the massive construction. On Blanc's insistence, the Spelugues area where the gambling complex was located was renamed to make it sound more attractive to casino visitors. A few suggestions were considered, and the name Monte Carlo was chosen in Prince Charles' honor.

In 1878–79, the casino building was transformed and expanded to designs of Jules Dutrou (1819–1885) and Charles Garnier, the architect who had designed the Paris opera house, now known as the Palais Garnier. François Blanc knew Garnier because Blanc had provided a loan of at least 4.9 million gold francs to the cash-strapped government of the French Third Republic so that the opera house, which had been started in 1861, could be completed. It had finally opened in 1875. The alterations to the Casino de Monte-Carlo included the addition of a concert hall (designed by Garnier and later named the Salle Garnier), located on the side of the casino facing the sea, and the redesign and expansion of the gaming rooms and public spaces, mostly carried out by Dutrou on the side of the casino facing the Place du Casino, where the Hôtel de Paris Monte-Carlo and the Café de Paris were also located.

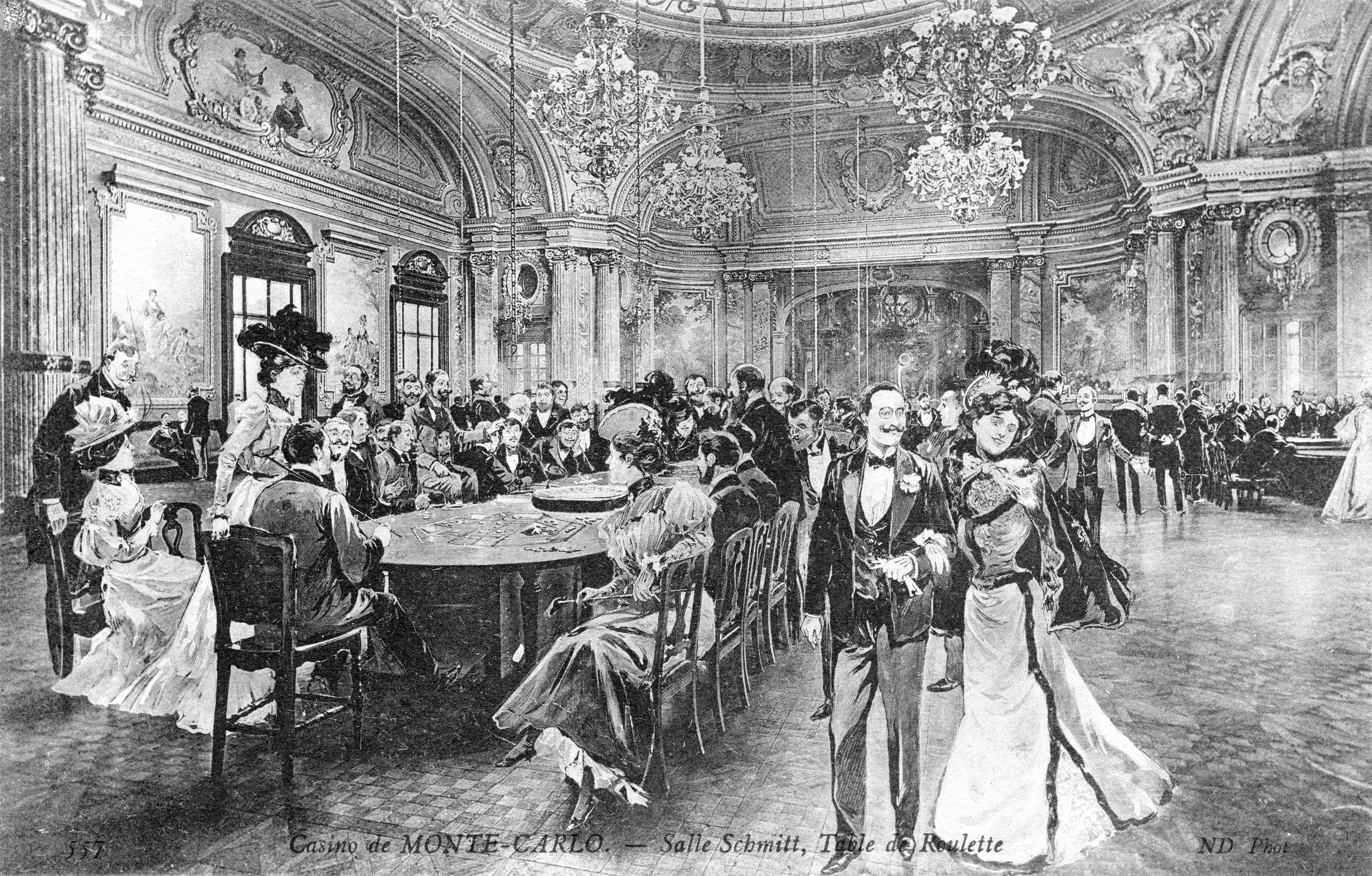
Roulette table in the Salle Schmitt, from an old postcard, c. 1910 (Neurdein Frères, Paris)

In 1880–81, the casino was expanded again, to the east of Dutrou's Moorish Room, by the addition of the Trente-et-Quarante Gaming Room, also designed by Garnier. Subsequent additions and expansions, and the remodeling of the Trente-et-Quarante Gaming Room into the Salle des Américains, have mostly obliterated Garnier's contributions to this part of the casino, except for some ceiling decorations. In 1898–99, the Salle Garnier was remodeled by architect Henri Schmit, primarily in the stage area, so that it would be more suitable for opera and ballet performances. However, much of Garnier's original facade and the interior design of the auditorium itself remain intact. Despite all of the later additions and modifications, the casino still has a distinctly Beaux Arts style.

In 1921, the first Women’s Olympiad was held at the casino gardens. Until recently, the Casino de Monte-Carlo has been the primary source of income for the House of Grimaldi and the Monegasque economy.

== Facilities ==
The casino consists of 2 buildings: The Casino de Monte-Carlo proper, and the nearby Casino Café de Paris for more conventional gambling with lower minimum bets. The former also has themed rooms with different entry and dress code criteria. As of February 2026, the games in the non-VIP rooms are open from 14:00-01:00 7 days a week, with dress codes getting stricter from 19:00.

- Different kinds of roulette
- Texas Hold'em poker
- Blackjack
- Trente et Quarante
- Craps
- Baccarat
- Video poker
- Slot machines

== 1913 gambler's fallacy ==
The most famous example of the gambler's fallacy occurred in a game of roulette at the Casino de Monte-Carlo in the summer of 1913, when the ball fell in black 26 times in a row, an extremely uncommon occurrence. Gamblers lost millions of francs betting against black, reasoning incorrectly that the streak was causing an "imbalance" in the randomness of the wheel, and that it had to be followed by a long streak of red.

== Breaking the bank ==
- In 1873, Joseph Jagger gained the casino great publicity by "breaking the bank at Monte Carlo" by discovering and capitalizing on a bias in one of the casino's roulette wheels. Technically, the bank in this sense was the money kept on the table by the croupier. According to an article in The Times in the late 19th century, it was thus possible to "break the bank" several times. The 1892 song "The Man Who Broke the Bank at Monte Carlo", made famous by the music hall singer and comedian Charles Coborn, was probably inspired by the exploits of Charles Wells, who "broke the bank" on many occasions on the first two of his three trips.
- According to the book Busting Vegas by Ben Mezrich, a team of blackjack players recruited from the Massachusetts Institute of Technology by team-leader Victor Cassius and Semyon Dukach attempted to break the bank at Monte Carlo with the assistance of a team-play-based system. The book describes how the management of Monte Carlo responded to the success of the team. According to Semyon, the account in Busting Vegas is accurate aside from the fact that the team was made up of himself, Andy Bloch, and another player he refers to as "Katie".

== Other mentions ==
- Monte Carlo methods, a family of computational approaches that rely on repeated random sampling to solve difficult numerical problems, were named after the Casino de Monte-Carlo by physicist Nicholas Metropolis.
- CASINO, a quantum Monte Carlo method
- Casino, a portion of the Circuit de Monaco of the Monaco Grand Prix

== Gallery ==
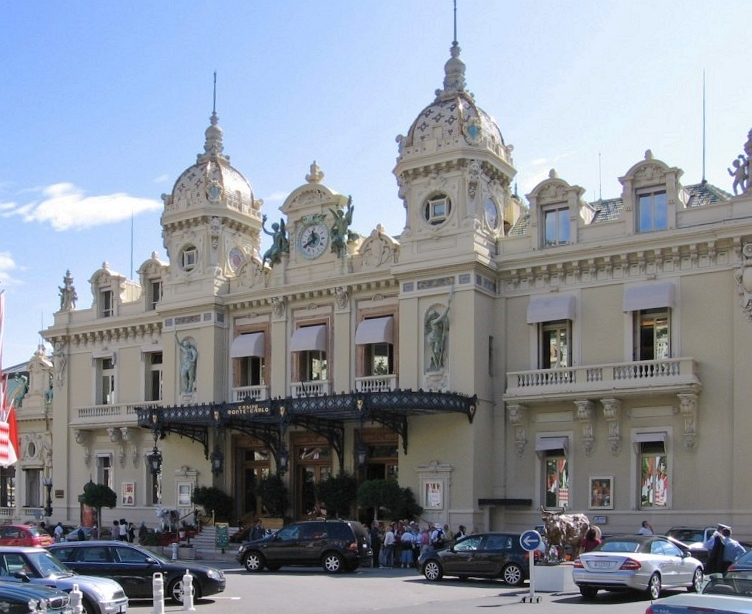
The Casino de Monte-Carlo main entrance

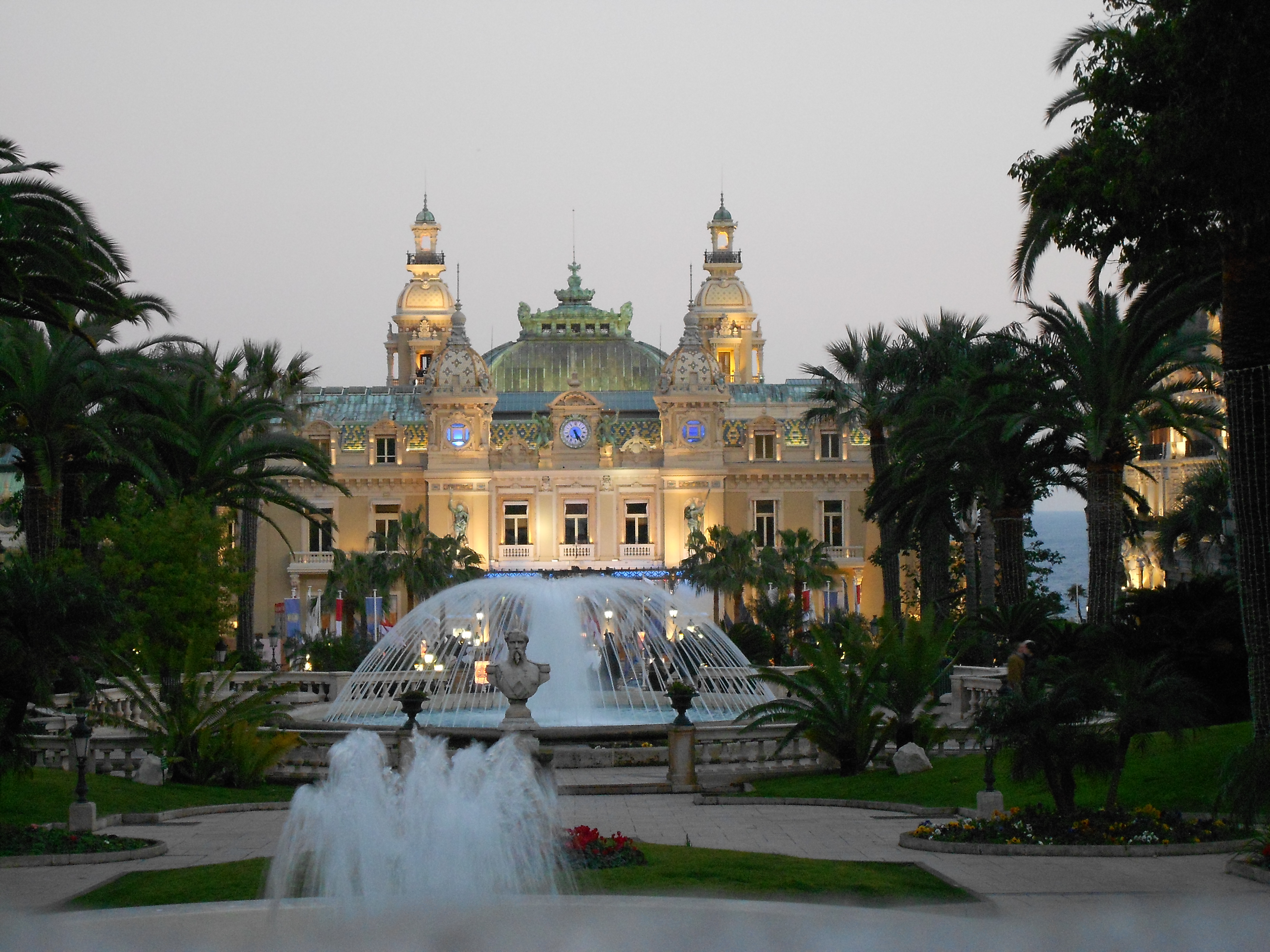
View of the casino illuminated at dusk

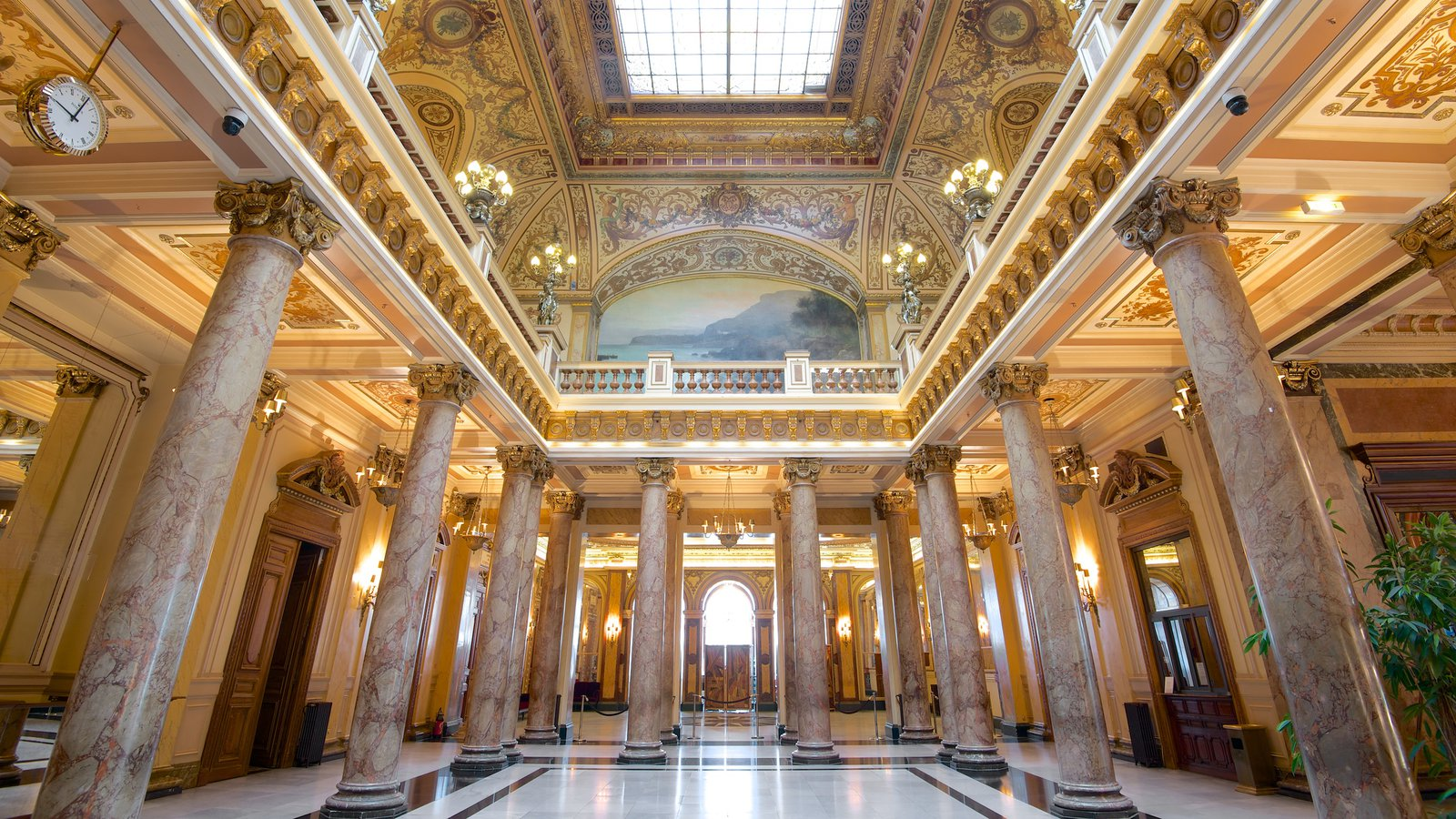
The main hall

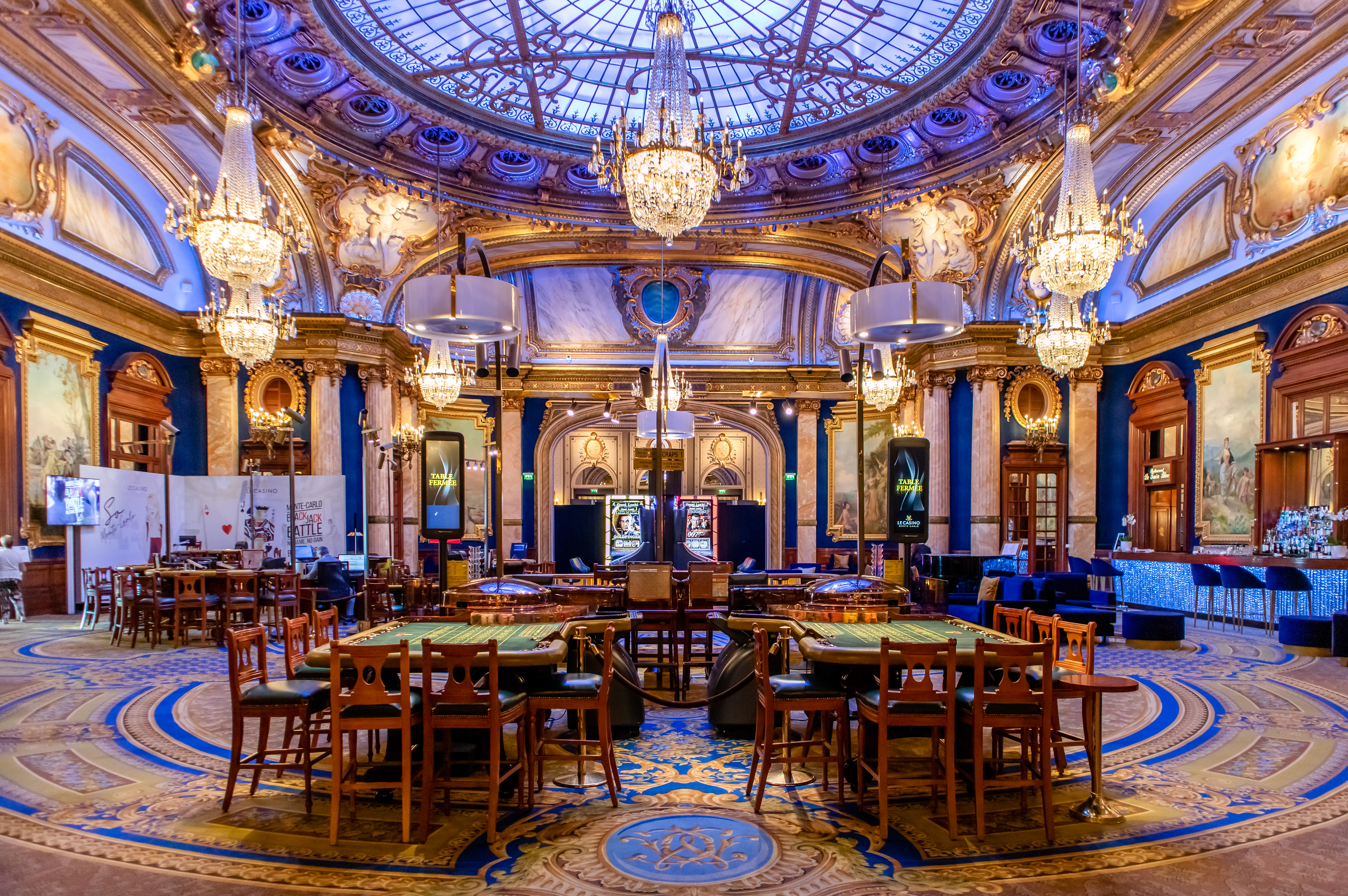
Roulette tables in the Salle Europe

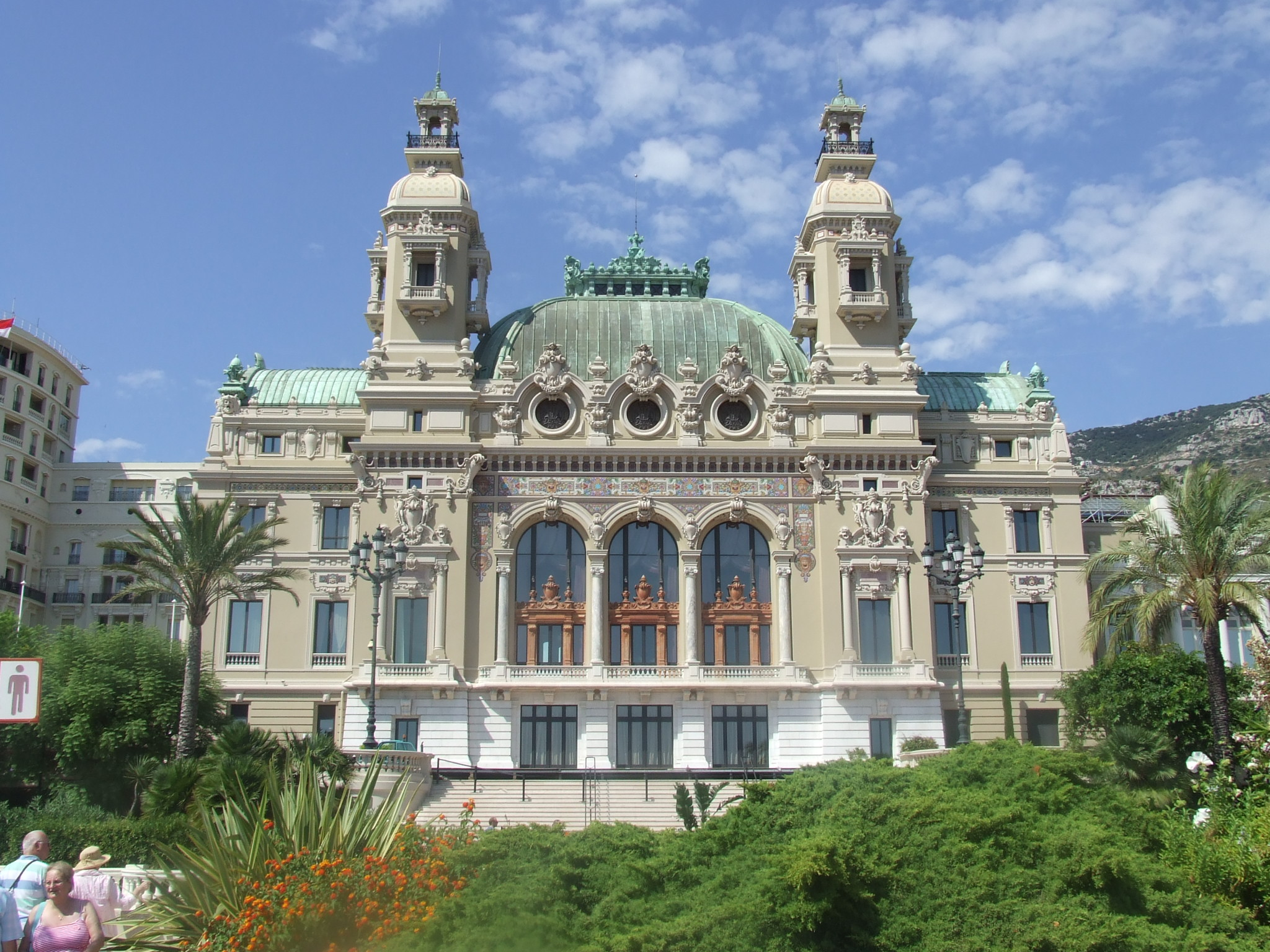
The gardens behind the casino with the Salle Garnier in the background

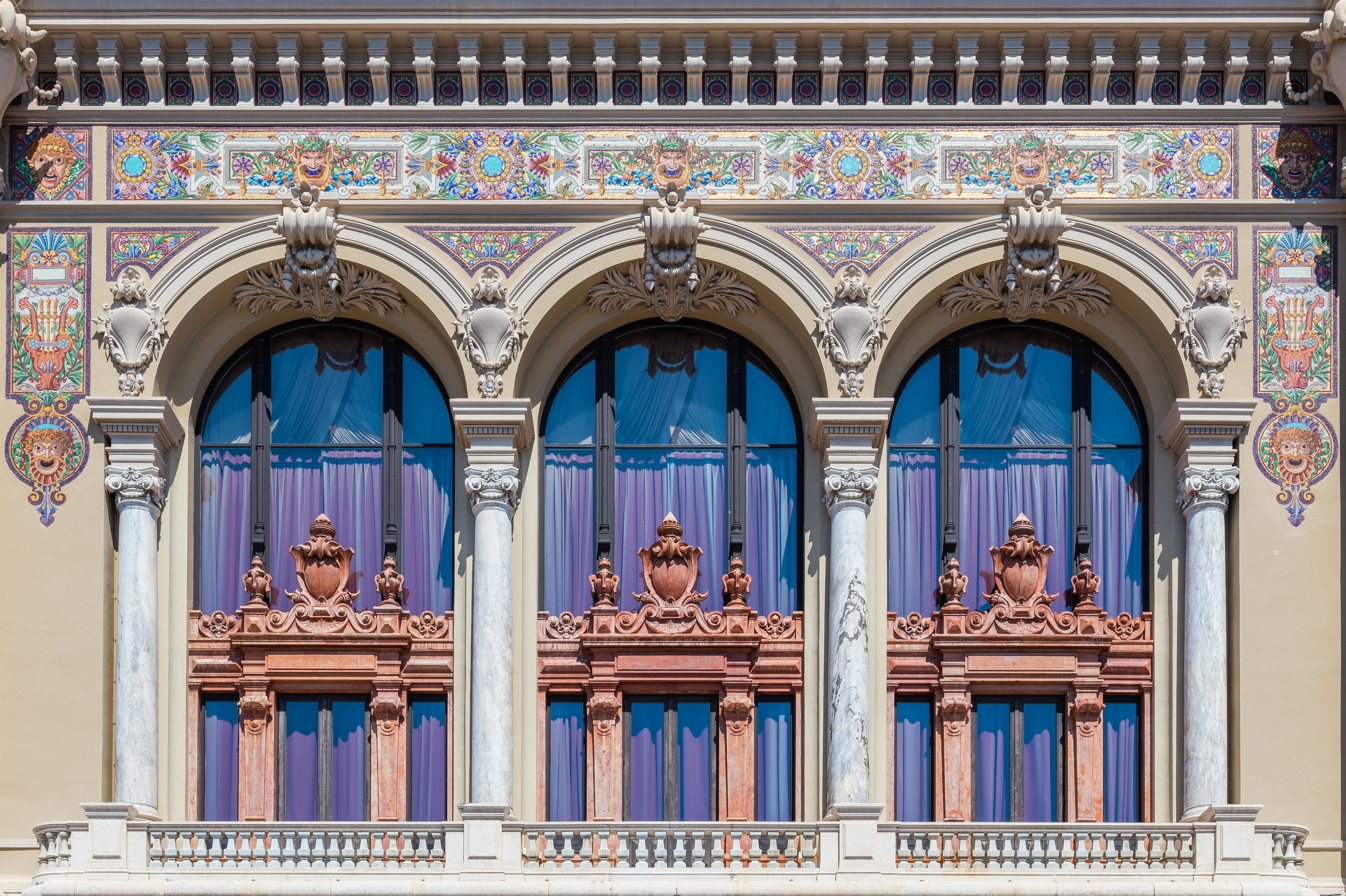
South balcony

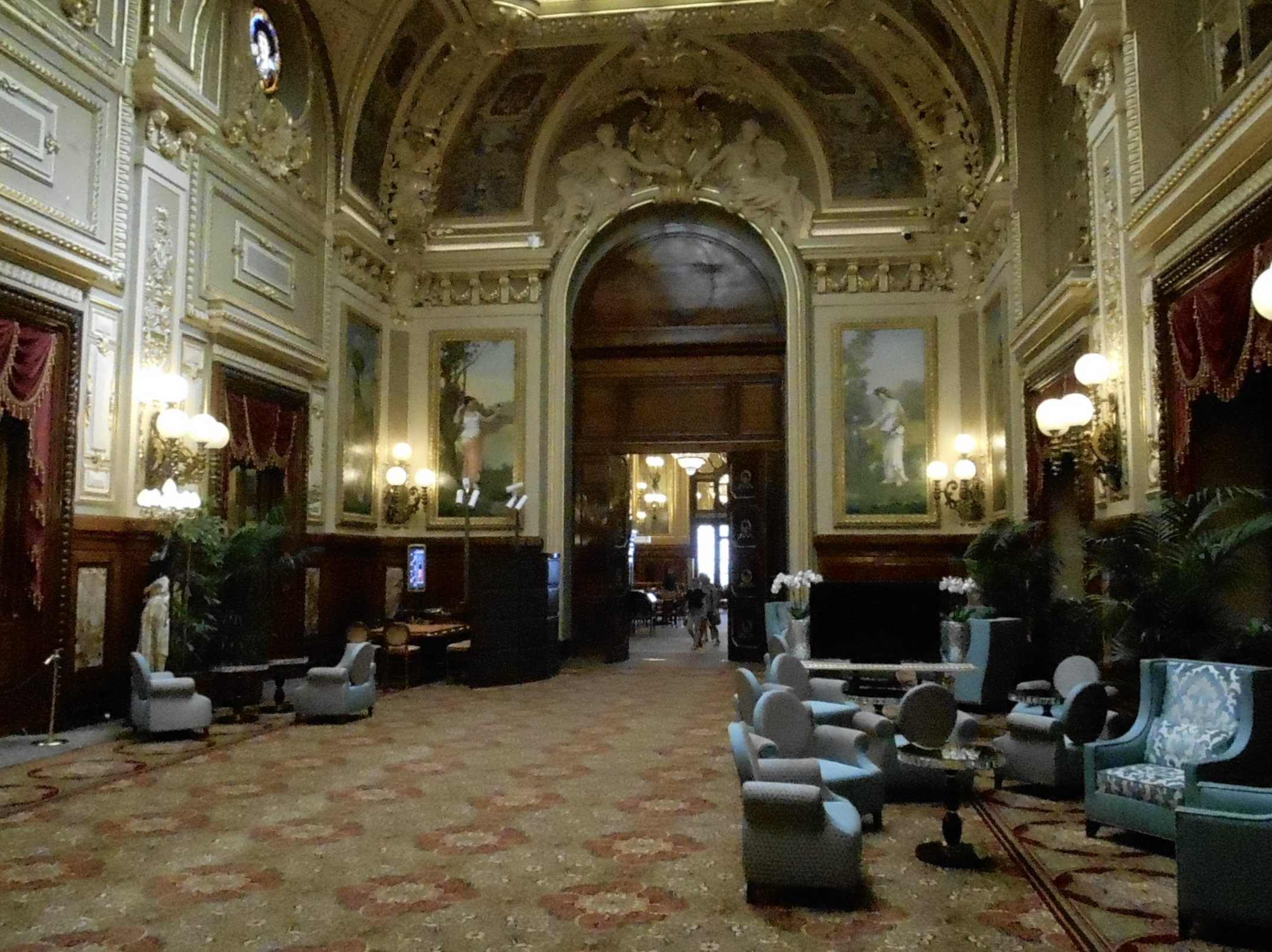
Main salon

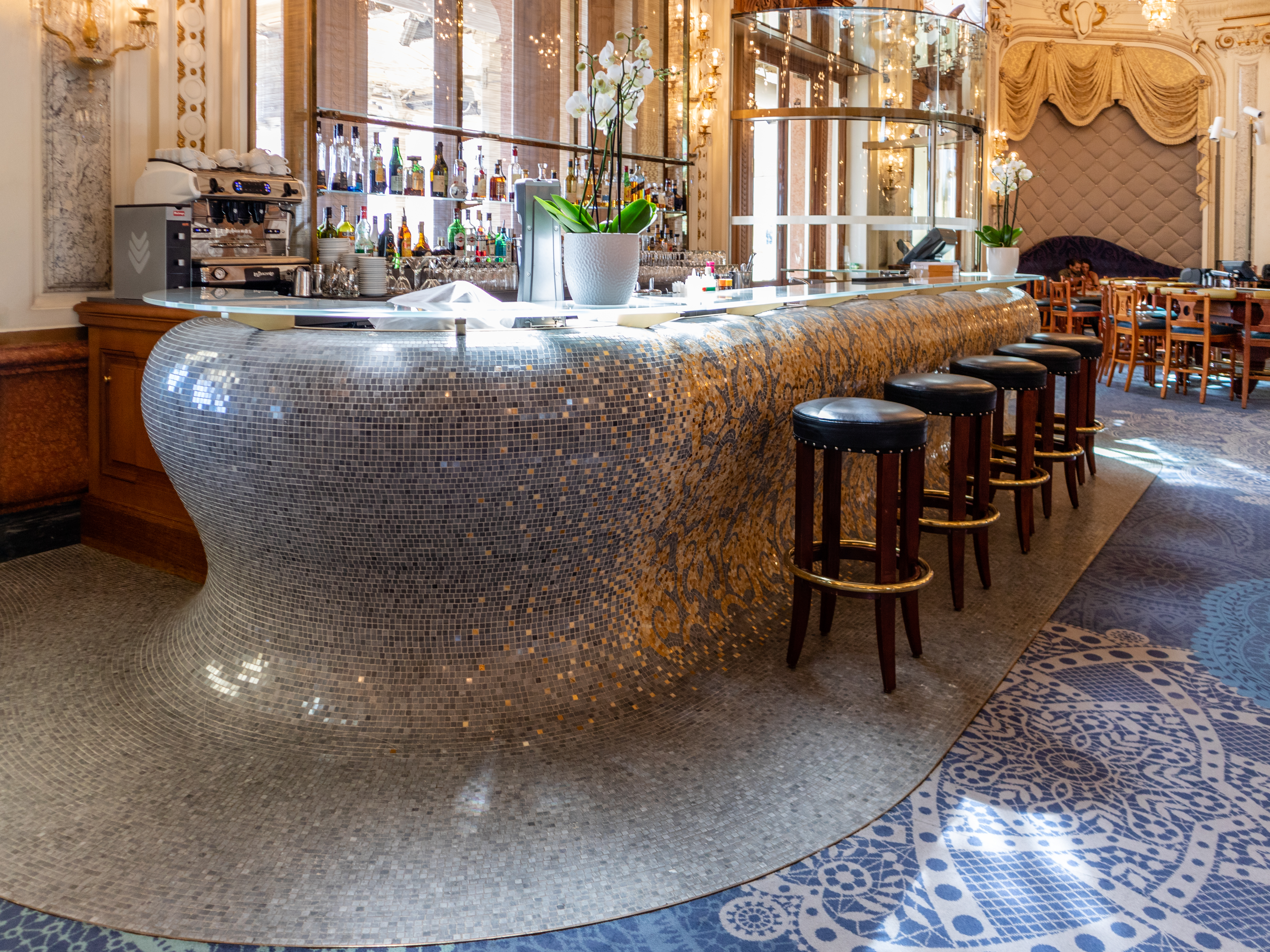
Bar inside the casino

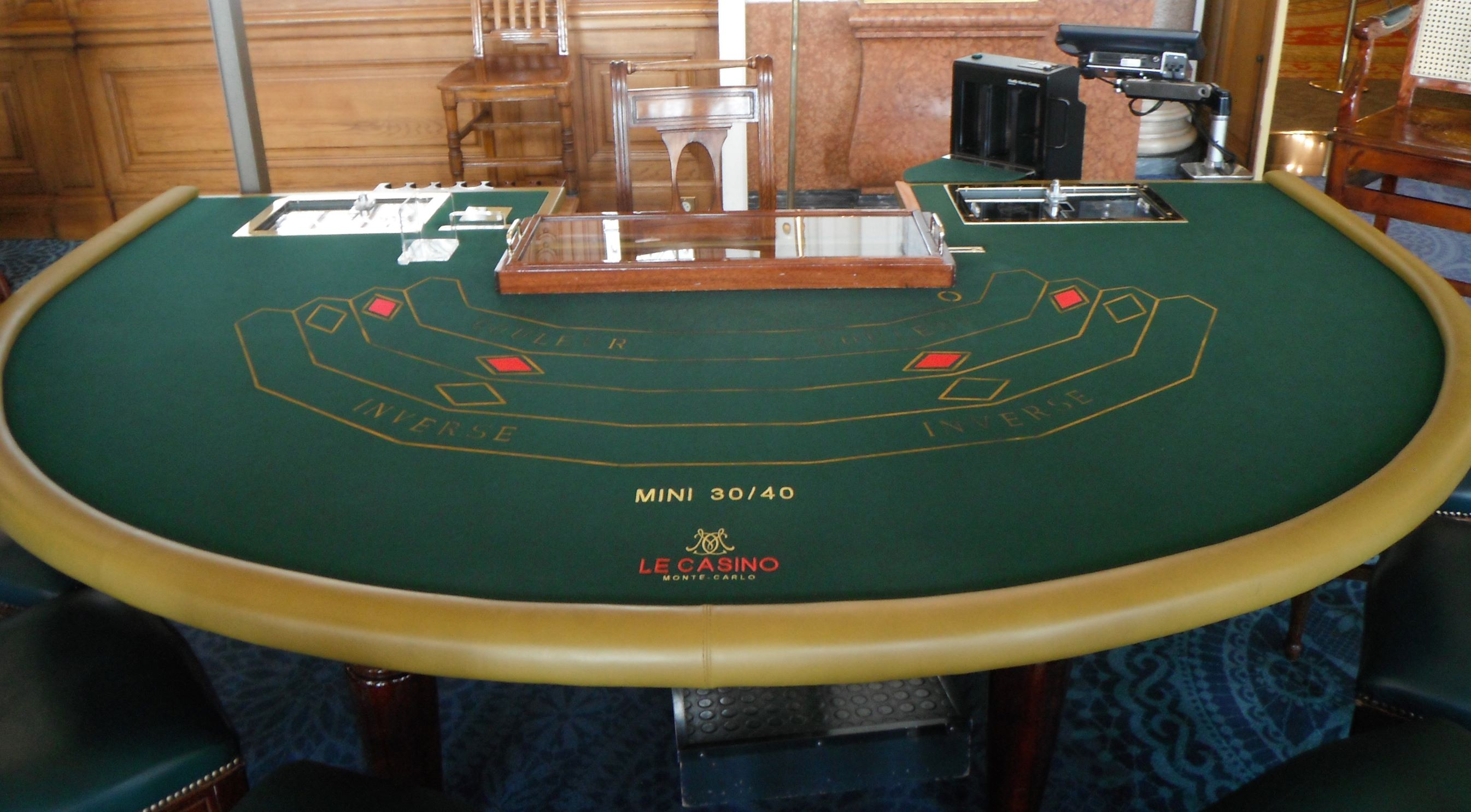
Casino table game

== See also ==
- Casino Gardens and Terraces
- Sanremo Casino
