= Casino Gardens and Terraces =

Public gardens in Monaco

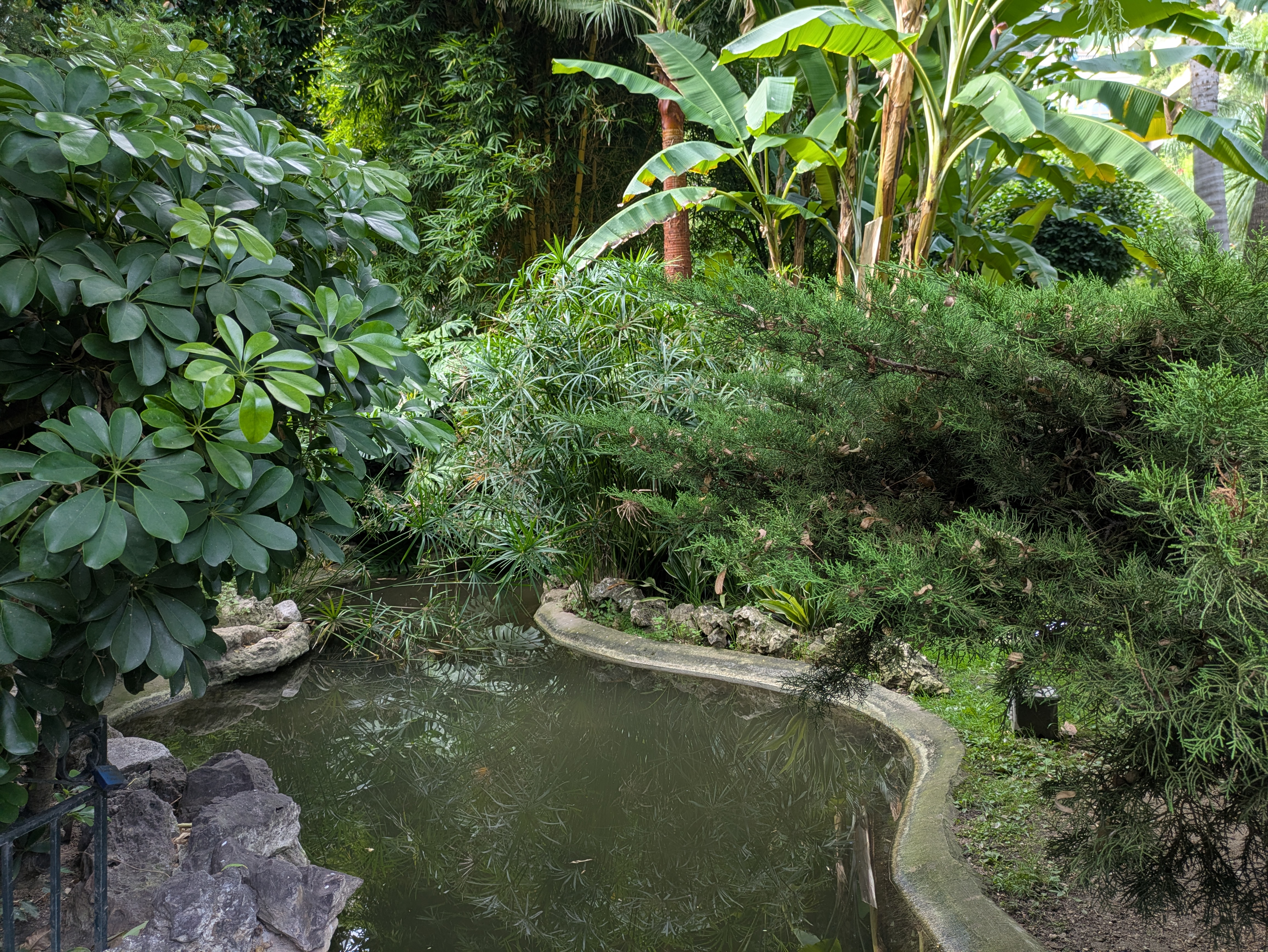
Little Africa Gardens

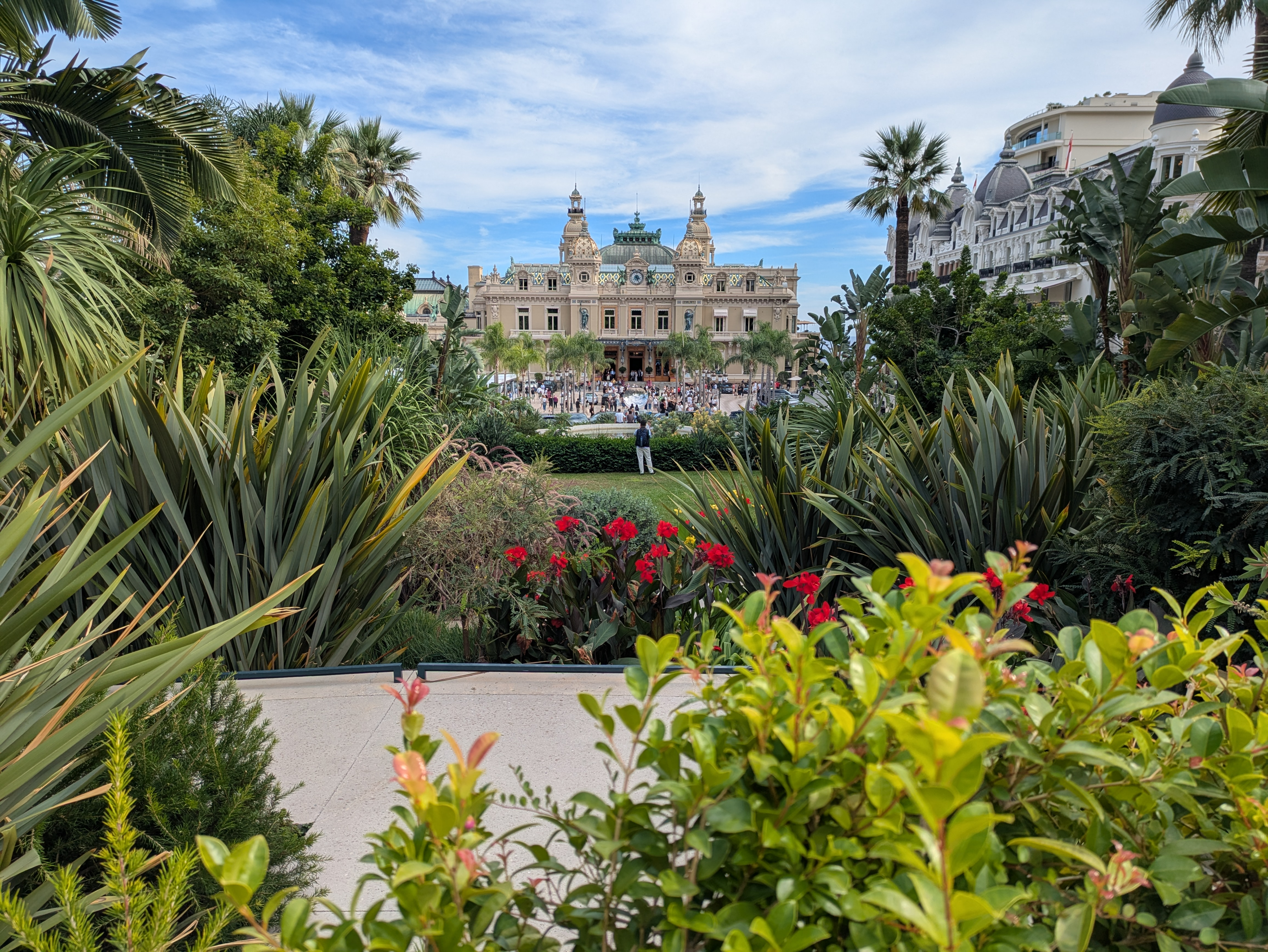
Casino Garden

The Casino Gardens and Terraces are public gardens that surround the Monte Carlo Casino in the Monte Carlo district of Monaco. The gardens contain lawns and fountains and a "Little Africa" garden. At the bottom of the terraces is Victor Vasarely's artwork Hexa Grace, made of multi coloured tiles. The gardens were founded in the late 19th century and formed the largest public space in Monaco in the 1950s. The gardens are frequently used to display large public artworks. The gardens were designed by the architect Edouard André. The original designs for the garden incorporated waterfalls stretching down a slope to terminate in a pond amidst sunken gardens. The trees washingtonia robusta and brachychiton populneus are prominent in the gardens.

A 1959 report on the gardens noted a long avenue of palm trees, in addition to flower beds, bottle trees, and cacti thriving in the frost free subtropic environment.
