= Bethel Chapel, Shelf =

Chapel in West Yorkshire, England

Coordinates: 53.7564°N 1.8078°W

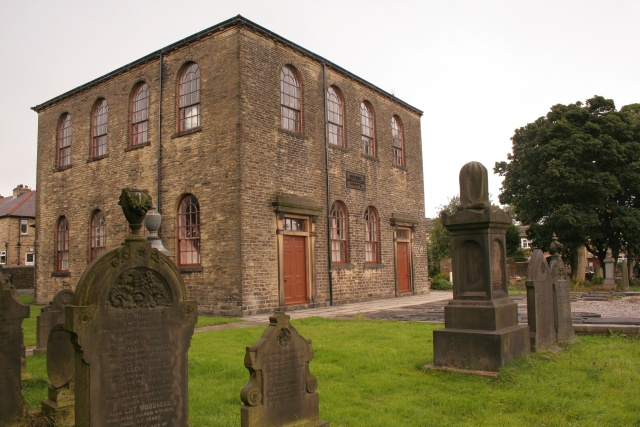
Bethel Chapel

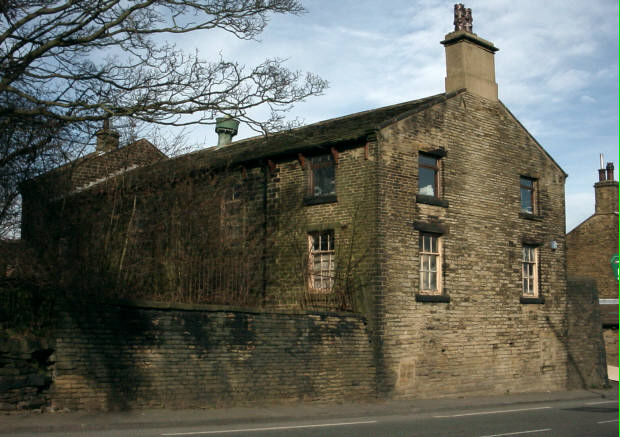
Former Bethel Chapel Sunday School

The Bethel Chapel (1853) is an independent Methodist chapel in Halifax Road, Shelf, Yorkshire.

Records compiled in 2007 show that 4,938 people have been buried in the graveyard there since it opened in 1852, including three Elizabeth Taylors and one Isaac Newton.

== History ==
The chapel was built in 1853; it is unknown who was responsible for its construction. Additions to the building were made in 1995, including new washrooms, a kitchen, and an upper floor. Many of the original box pews have been preserved.

The chapel was affiliated with the Wesleyan Reform movement from its opening until 1873, when it joined the United Methodist Free Church. It remains an independent Methodist church.

== Notable burials ==
Notable burials include Joseph Jagger, the man who in 1881 "broke the bank at Monte Carlo" and Edward Hartley, an early socialist politician who retired to Shelf.

The cemetery includes at least three war graves from the First World War, including Second Lieutenant A. E. Lord of the Yorkshire Regiment who won the Military Medal and died in 1918.
