= Charles Jeremiah Wells =

English poet (1799–1879)

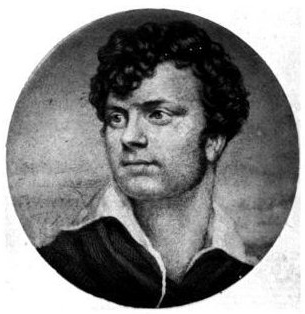
Charles Jeremiah Wells

Charles Jeremiah Wells (25 January 1799 – 17 February 1879) was an English poet.

== Family ==
His parents were James Turner Wells (1772–1838) and Jane Sears (?–1832). On 15 July 1825 he married Emily Jane Hill (1807–1872), the daughter of a school-teacher. Their children were:

- Emily Jane (1827–1885)
- Anna Maria (1828–1903)
- Florence Hazlitt (1832–1835)
- Charles James Llewellyn (1834–1836)
- Florence Llewellyn (1837–?)
- Charles De Ville Wells (1841–1922), gambler and criminal.

== Life ==
He was born in Pentonville, London, on 25 January 1799. He was educated at Cowden Clarke's school in Edmonton, with Tom Keats, younger brother of the poet John Keats, and Richard Henry Horne. He became acquainted with Keats, and was the friend who sent him some roses, to whom Keats wrote a sonnet on 29 June 1816: "When, O Wells! thy roses came to me, My sense with their deliciousness was spelled; Soft voices had they, that, with tender plea, Whisper'd of peace and truth and friendliness unquelled."

Wells soon afterwards played a practical joke on the dying Tom Keats, and reappears in the elder poet's correspondence as "that degraded Wells". Wells was in literary emulation of Keats and John Hamilton Reynolds, and his early writings were the result of this. In 1822 he published Stories after Nature--or rather, in the manner of Boccaccio, tempered by that of Leigh Hunt. At the end of 1823, using the pseudonym H. L. Howard, he published the Biblical drama Of Joseph and his Brethren (dated 1824). For the next three years Wells saw William Hazlitt, he said, every night, but the two men were estranged during 1827. When Hazlitt died, in September 1830, Wells took Horne to see his dead friend, and afterwards raised a monument to the memory of Hazlitt in St Anne's Church, Soho.

His two books were almost unnoticed. Wells was now practising as a solicitor in London, but he thought that his health was failing and proceeded to South Wales, where he occupied himself with shooting, fishing and writing poetry until 1835, when he relocated to Broxbourne in Hertfordshire.

In 1841 he left England, never to visit it again. He settled at Quimper, in Brittany, where he lived for some years. He published a story named Claribel in 1845, and one or two minor stories later, but several tragedies and a great deal of miscellaneous verse belonging to these years are lost. Wells stated in a letter to Horne (November 1877) that he had composed eight or ten volumes of poetry during his life, but that, having failed to find a publisher for any of them, he burned the manuscripts at his wife's death. The only work he had retained was a revised form of Joseph and his Brethren, which was praised in 1838 by the author Thomas Wade, and again by Horne, in his New Spirit of the Age, in 1844. The drama was then once more forgotten, until in 1863 it was read and praised by Dante Gabriel Rossetti.

From that time Joseph and his Brethren became well known among poets. Algernon Charles Swinburne wrote a study of it in the Fortnightly Review in 1875, and the drama itself was reprinted in 1876. Between 1876 and 1878 Wells added various scenes, which became possessed by Buxton Fornian, who published one of them in 1895. After leaving Quimper, Wells went to reside at Marseille, where he had a professorship.

Swinburne said that there are lines in Wells "which might more naturally be mistaken, even by an expert, for the work of the young Shakespeare, than any to be gathered elsewhere in the fields of English poetry". In 1909 a reprint was published of Joseph and his Brethren, with Swinburne's essay, and reminiscences by Walter Theodore Watts-Dunton.
