= Frederick Gilbert =

England international rugby union player (1883–1964)

- Full name: Frederick George Gilbert
- Born: 30 December 1883 Plymouth, England
- Died: 11 December 1964 (aged 80) Plymouth, England

Rugby union career
- Position: Fullback
International career
| Years | Team | Apps | (Points) |
| 1923 | England | 2 | (0) |

Frederick George Gilbert (30 December 1883 – 11 December 1964) was an English international rugby union player.

Born in Plymouth in 1884 Gilbert was a Devonport Services fullback and in 1923 became the oldest player to debut for England at 39. He featured in England's first two Five Nations fixtures, wins over Wales at Twickenham and Ireland at Leicester, en route to a fourth grand slam.

== See also ==
- List of England national rugby union players
