= Men who broke the bank at Monte Carlo =

Several notably successful gamblers

The Monte Carlo Casino in Monte Carlo, Monaco, was inaugurated in 1863. Since then the bank has been broken on a number of occasions. The expression "breaking the bank" is used when a gambler wins more money than the reserve held at that particular table in the casino. At the start of each day, every table was funded with a cash reserve of 100,000 francs – known as "the bank". If this reserve was insufficient to pay the winnings, play at that table was suspended while extra funds were brought out from the casino's vaults.

In a ceremony devised by François Blanc, the original owner of the casino, a black cloth was laid over the table in question, and the successful player was said to have broken the bank. After an interval the table re-opened and play continued. The names of only a few of the men who broke the bank are known, and some are listed below.

== Joseph Jagger ==
Joseph Jagger was a Bradford textile engineer who looked for and found imperfections in the balance of a wheel which he exploited to win a fortune and break the bank. The casino responded by redesigning the wheels with moveable partitions and introducing spirit levels so that this method could never be used again.

== Charles Wells ==
Charles Wells won large sums of money at Monte Carlo when he attended the casino in July–August and November 1891. He is generally thought to have inspired the song "The Man who Broke the Bank at Monte Carlo".

== William Darnborough ==
William Nelson Darnborough (1869–1958), also known as 'Bill Darnborough', was an American gambler from Bloomington, Illinois, who was known for his success in roulette at Monte Carlo from 1904 to 1911. During that time period he amassed a fortune of $415,000 ($11,374,844 in 2020) In one of the more legendary feats, Darnborough bet on the number 5 and won on five successive spins.

== Kenneth Clark ==
This Scottish industrialist was the father of Kenneth Clark the art historian. It is stated that he "enjoyed gambling and frequented the Casino at Monte Carlo where he met with regular and extraordinary luck. According to Clark, after one such successful evening of roulette, he bought a small, recently created golf course at Sospel, behind Mentone, and then built a hotel there."

== Arthur de Courcy Bower ==
Arthur Bower—the self-styled "Captain Arthur de Courcy Bower"—was a convicted fraudster who had been sentenced to six months hard labour in 1904. He was subsequently reported to have won the maximum payout eighteen times in a row and to have broken the bank five times on a visit to the casino in 1911. Certain published works claim that it was Bower who inspired the popular song, but as his casino wins occurred some twenty years after the song was published, this would seem an impossibility.
