= The Man Who Broke the Bank at Monte Carlo (song) =

Song by Fred Gilbert

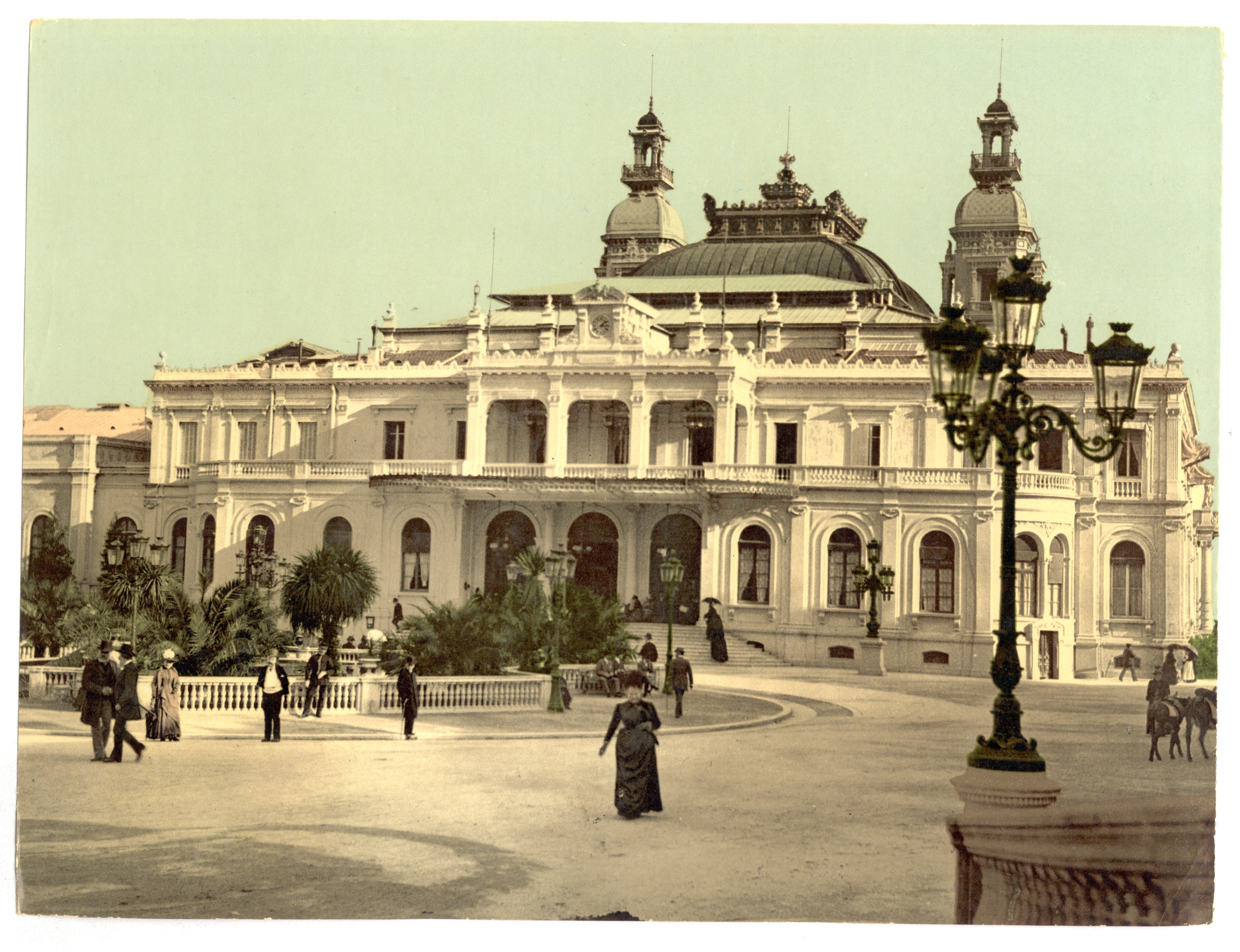
Monte Carlo Casino, 1890s

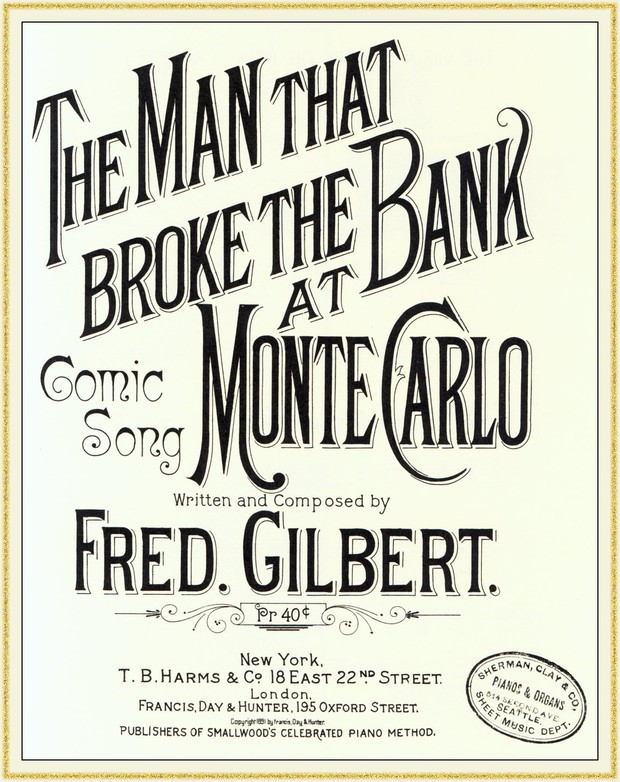
Sheet music for Fred Gilbert's music hall song "The Man who Broke the Bank at Monte Carlo"

"The Man Who Broke the Bank at Monte Carlo" (originally titled "The Man that Broke the Bank at Monte Carlo") is a popular British music hall song published in 1891 by Fred Gilbert, a theatrical agent who had begun to write comic songs as a sideline some twenty years previously. The song was popularised by music hall singer and comedian Charles Coborn.

The song became a staple of Coborn's act, performed on tour in different languages throughout the world. Coborn confirmed that Gilbert's inspiration was the English gambler and confidence trickster Charles Wells. Wells was reported to have won one-and-a-half million francs at the Monte Carlo casino, using the profits from previous fraud. However, others suggested as the model include the Yorkshire textile worker Joseph Jagger (see Men who broke the bank at Monte Carlo) and Kenneth MacKenzie Clark, father of the art historian Kenneth Clark. According to the Financial Times, "the public saw him (Wells) as a Robin Hood figure; hence the serenading".

Coborn wrote in his 1928 autobiography that to the best of his recollection he first sang the song in 'the latter part of 1891.' An advertisement in a London newspaper suggests, however, that he first performed it in public in mid-February 1892. The song remained popular from the 1890s until the late 1940s, and is still referenced in popular culture, which includes 1942 The Magnificent Ambersons (film) as well a scene in the 1962 film Lawrence of Arabia when Lawrence (Peter O'Toole) sings the tune while riding across the desert. Coborn, then aged 82, performed the song in both English and French in the 1934 British film Say It with Flowers.

== In popular culture ==
A parody titled The Tanks That Broke the Ranks Out in Picardy was jointly written by music hall lyricist Harry Castling in 1916 to celebrate the introduction of the tank which was first used by the British in 1916 as part of the Battle of the Somme. The song was popular in Britain during Christmas pantomime performances at the end of 1916.

The song appears in Booth Tarkington's 1918 novel The Magnificent Ambersons, as well as in Orson Welles' 1942 film adaptation. Coborn performed the song in both English and French in the 1934 British film Say It with Flowers. The song title inspired the 1935 US romantic comedy The Man Who Broke the Bank at Monte Carlo. Although the song appears in the film, the narrative bears little relation to either the song or to the story of Charles Wells. The film and song were involved in the copyright case Francis, Day & Hunter Ltd v Twentieth Century Fox Corp. Bing Crosby included the song in a medley on his album 101 Gang Songs (1961).

In the 1962 film Lawrence of Arabia, Lawrence (Peter O'Toole) sings the song while riding across the desert to the camp of Prince Faisal. A short excerpt is included in the 1970 film The Railway Children. In Thomas Pynchon's 1973 novel Gravity's Rainbow, Tyrone Slothrop, evidently knowing the song but not having understood the lyrics properly, spends time in Monte Carlo fruitlessly looking for the Bois de Boulogne.

Aloysius Parker sings a brief snatch of the song in the Thunderbirds episode "The Man from Mi5". The melody of the song is used in the season eleven episode of American Dad! "The Shrink". After the lead character, Stan, employs a CIA shrink ray in order to live in a miniature city of his own creation, the character sings "The Man Who Built the World in His Basement". In the 2017 film Alien: Covenant, in mimicry of his idol Lawrence of Arabia, the android David sings the words of the song's title while he is cutting his own hair in the mirror.

After George Soros made a profit of £1 billion during the 1992 Black Wednesday UK currency crisis by means of a successful short sale of £10 billion worth of pounds sterling, he has been called "The Man Who Broke the Bank of England".

== Lyrics ==
I've just got here, to Paris, from the sunny southern shore;
I to Monte Carlo went, just to raise my winter's rent.
Dame Fortune smiled upon me as she'd never done before,
And I've now such lots of money, I'm a gent.
Yes, I've now such lots of money, I'm a gent.

As I walk along the Bois de Boulogne
With an independent air
You can hear the girls declare
"He must be a Millionaire."
You can hear them sigh and wish to die,
You can see them wink the other eye
At the man who broke the bank at Monte Carlo.

I stay indoors 'til after lunch, and then my daily walk
To the great Triumphal Arch is one grand triumphal march,
Observed by each observer with the keenness of a hawk,
I'm a mass of money, linen, silk and starch -
I'm a mass of money, linen, silk and starch.

Chorus

I patronised the tables at the Monte Carlo hell
Till they hadn't got a sou for a Christian or a Jew;
So I quickly went to Paris for the charms of mad'moiselle,
Who's the lodestone of my heart – what can I do,
When with twenty tongues she swears that she'll be true?

Chorus
