= Fred Gilbert (songwriter) =

British songwriter (1850–1903)

Frederick Younge Gilbert (2 March 1850 – 12 April 1903) was an English theatrical agent and writer of music hall songs.

Born in London, the son of a comedian also named Fred Gilbert, he performed in theatres as a singer before joining the office of theatrical agent Ambrose Maynard. He soon changed to the office of another agent, Charles Roberts, and began writing songs, His first successful comic song was "Did You Ever See An Oyster Walk Upstairs?", performed by Frank Roberts and by Lizzie Coote, a young actress befriended by Lewis Carroll.

Gilbert began his own business as an agent while continuing to write songs as a supplement. In 1890, he wrote the song "The Man That Broke the Bank at Monte Carlo", reputedly inspired by the true story of Charles Wells, who was a confidence trickster who won some £40,000 at the Monte Carlo casino, using the profits from earlier frauds, but was later imprisoned for obtaining money by false pretences. Gilbert attempted to sell the song to various entertainers, but the only one interested was Charles Coborn, who paid Gilbert £10 for the rights to the song, and first sang it in late 1891. The song became a success, and Coborn continued to perform it until his death.

Gilbert also wrote other successful songs, notably "Down The Road" (1893) for Gus Elen, and "At Trinity Church I Met My Doom" (1894) for Tom Costello. However, he developed consumption or tuberculosis, and retired to Sandgate in Kent. He died there in 1903, aged 53.
