= Charles Coborn =

British music hall singer (1852–1945)

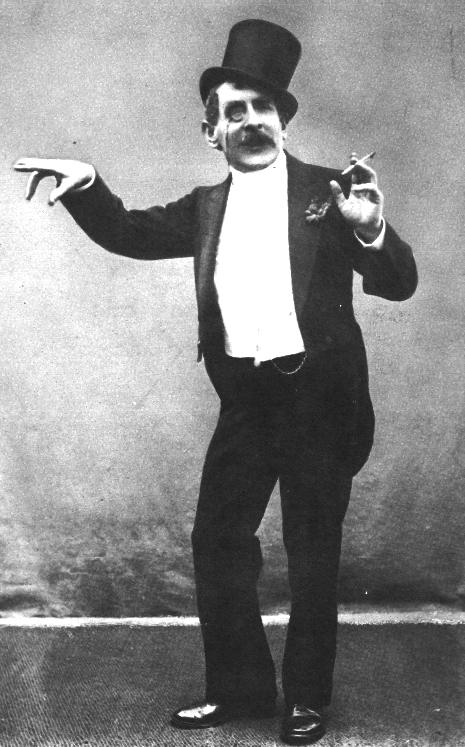
- As The Man Who Broke the Bank in Monte Carlo
- Born: Colin Whitton McCallum; 4 August 1852; Stepney, London, England
- Died: 23 November 1945 (aged 93); London, England
- Occupations: Music hall singer and comedian
- Relatives: Major Sir Duncan McCallum MC (son)

Colin Whitton McCallum (4 August 1852 – 23 November 1945), known by his stage name Charles Coborn, was a British music hall singer and comedian. During a long career, Coborn was known largely for two comic songs: "Two Lovely Black Eyes", and "The Man Who Broke the Bank at Monte Carlo."

== Biography ==
He was born in Stepney, East London, and adopted his stage name from Coborn Road, which feeds onto Bow Road. He made his music hall debut on the Isle of Dogs in 1872, and by 1879 was being billed at the Oxford Music Hall in London as "The Comic of the Day". In 1886, he heard American William J. Scanlan's song "My Nellie's Blue Eyes". Liking the melody but not the words, Coborn rewrote it as "Two Lovely Black Eyes", and began performing it regularly wearing a faded frock coat, carrying a battered umbrella and with two blackened eyes. He premièred it at the Paragon Theatre, in the Mile End Road, and the song was instantly successful.

In 1891, he bought the rights to Fred Gilbert's song, "The Man Who Broke the Bank at Monte Carlo". When Gilbert first offered the song, Coborn was reluctant to adopt it. In his autobiography he stated: "[I] liked the tune very much, especially the chorus, but I was rather afraid that some of the phrasing was rather too highbrow for an average music hall audience." But when he found that he could not get the chorus out of his mind, he decided to use it. The song became a regular of his act, and he performed it while touring, using different languages for it throughout the world. Coborn later estimated that he had performed the song 250,000 times in the course of his career, and could sing it in 14 languages. Coborn confirmed that Gilbert's inspiration was the gambler and confidence trickster Charles Wells, who was reported to have won one-and-a-half million francs at the Monte Carlo casino, using the profits from previous fraud.

Coborn's other, less successful, songs included "Should Husbands Work?", part of the music hall tradition of (normally conservative) social comment; "I've Loved Another Girl Since Then"; "He's All Right When You Know Him"; and "I've Never Turned Money Away", which created controversy when Coborn performed it using the stereotyped manner of a Jew in a Jewish-owned theatre (he apologised afterwards, but was banned from appearing in the venue again).

He toured extensively and performed in New York City and Toronto during 1900. Described as a 'literate man of high principles', he was never accepted completely by the music hall establishment, but performed much charitable work during the First World War and later as an effort to improve the conditions of music hall entertainers. He continued to make occasional performances, including one in the 1943 movie Variety Jubilee at the age of 91. He died in London in 1945. He is buried with his wife in Brompton Cemetery, London.

Recordings that he made during the 1920s can be found on the album Chairman's Choice – Music Hall Greats.

His eldest son, Major Duncan McCallum, became Member of Parliament for Argyllshire.

== Selected filmography ==
- Say It With Flowers (1934)
- Variety Jubilee (1943)
