= Breaking the bank =

Winning more than a gambling house has

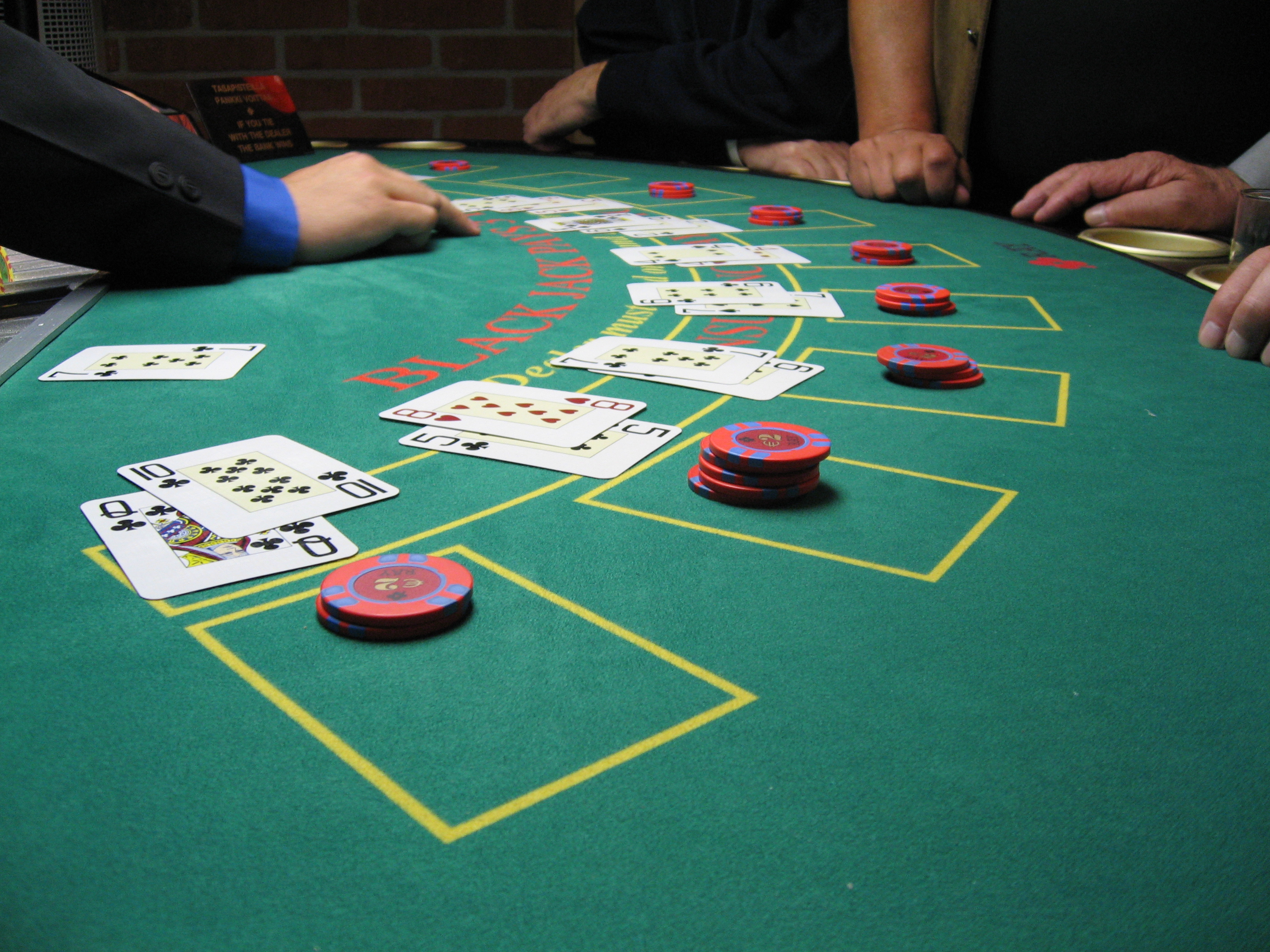
In blackjack, breaking the bank is statistically possible.

In gambling, breaking the bank refers to a player winning a large sum of money from a casino. The literal, extremely rare, situation of breaking the bank, is winning more than the house has on hand. The term can also be used for the act of winning more chips than there are at the table.

In blackjack, card counting can facilitate a winning streak that eventually breaks the bank.

== Process ==
Breaking the bank occurs only if the house fails to cap the total amount payable on a winning bet in a way that bears some reasonable relationship to the total amount of money in play. In contrast, parimutuel betting by its very nature does impose such a cap, and hence the bank cannot be broken.

== History ==
Mark Bowden reports in The Atlantic that blackjack player Don Johnson broke the bank in 2011 winning nearly $6 million at Atlantic City's Tropicana casino after previously taking the Borgata for $5 million and Caesars for $4 million. The Tropicana refused to continue playing with Johnson on the terms the casino had negotiated after Johnson won $5.8 million, the Borgata cut Johnson off at $5 million, and the dealer at Caesars refused to fill Johnson's chip tray once his earnings topped $4 million. Johnson had reportedly negotiated terms with the Tropicana that included a hand-shuffled six-deck shoe; the right to split and double down on up to four hands at once; and a "soft 17" whittling the house edge down to one-fourth of 1 percent so in effect, Johnson was playing a 50–50 game against the house, and with the 20% "loss rebate", Johnson was risking only 80 cents of every dollar he played.

In 2005, British investor Paul Newey nearly broke the bank at Birmingham's Genting Casino Star City, where he won £3 million and forced owner Stanley Leisure to issue a profit warning and caused the casino value to decline by 12%.

== See also ==
- Men who broke the bank at Monte Carlo
