= Thomas Wade (writer) =

English writer

Thomas Wade (1805 – 19 September 1875) was an English poet and dramatist.

== Life ==
Wade, known in early life as Wade Lavender, was born at Woodbridge, Suffolk. He went to London at a young age, where he began to publish verse influenced by Byron, Keats and especially Shelley. He wrote some plays that were produced on the London stage with the benefit of the acting of Charles and Fanny Kemble.

Wade contributed verse to magazines, and for some years he was editor as well as part-proprietor of Bell's Weekly Messenger. When it proved financially unsuccessful, he retired to Jersey, where he edited the British Press, continuing to publish poetry until 1871. He died in Jersey on 19 September 1875. His wife was Lucy Eager, a musician.

== Works ==
The most notable of Wade's publications were:

- Tasso and the Sisters; Tasso's Spirit; the Nuptials of Juno; the Skeletons; the Spirits of the Ocean: Poems (1825)
- Woman's Love (1828), a play produced at Covent Garden
- The Phrenologists, a farce produced at Covent Garden in 1830
- The Jew of Arragon, a play that was "howled from the stage" at Covent Garden in 1830 owing to its sympathy with the Jew
- Mundi et Cordis de rebus sempiternis et temporariis Carmina (1835), a volume of poems and sonnets, many of which had previously appeared in the Monthly Repository; The Contention of Death and Love; Helena and The Shadow Seeker — these three being published in the form of pamphlets in 1837
- Prothanasia and other Poems (1839).

Wade also wrote a drama entitled King Henry II, and a translation of Dante's Inferno in the metre of the original, both unpublished; and a series of sonnets inspired by his wife, some published.
