= Charles Wells (gambler) =

English gambler and fraudster

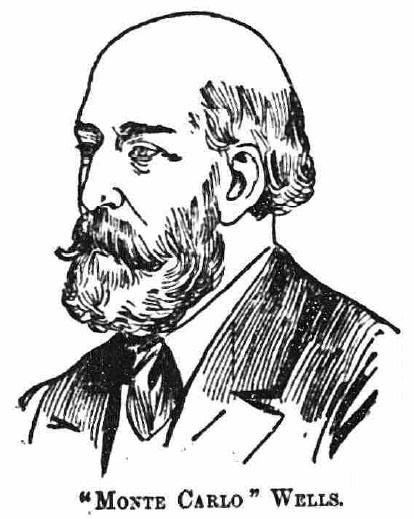
Charles Deville Wells

Charles De Ville Wells (20 April 1841 – July 1922) was an English gambler and fraudster. In a series of successful gambles in 1891 he "broke the bank at Monte Carlo" (depleted the funds of the gaming table at which he was playing), celebrated by the song "The Man Who Broke the Bank at Monte Carlo". Subsequently, he was often referred to, especially in publications, as "Monte Carlo Wells".

== Family and early life ==
Charles De Ville Wells was born in Broxbourne, Hertfordshire, on 20 April 1841. His father was Charles Jeremiah Wells (1799–1879), poet and lawyer, to whom John Keats once addressed a sonnet (To a Friend Who Sent Me Some Roses) His mother was Emily Jane Hill, the daughter of a Hertfordshire school teacher. When he was a few weeks old, the family relocated from their home in Broxbourne, Hertfordshire, to France, where they lived initially at Quimper, and later at Marseille.

== Career ==
Wells found employment as an engineer at the shipyards and docks of Marseille during the 1860s. In 1868, he invented a device for regulating the speed of ships' propellers and sold the patent for 5,000 francs (approximately five times his annual salary). In about 1879, he relocated to Paris, where he persuaded members of the public to invest in a fraudulent scheme to build a railway at Berck-sur-Mer in Pas-de-Calais. He disappeared with his clients' money and was convicted in his absence by a Paris court. He relocated to Britain, where, from 1885 onwards, he persuaded members of the public to invest in what he claimed were valuable inventions of his own devising. Although he promised substantial profits, there is no evidence that any of his backers ever received a return on their outlay. One lost almost £19,000 (equivalent to £1.9m presently, allowing for inflation).

=== Breaking the bank ===
Wells visited the Monte Carlo Casino in late July to early August 1891, and again during November of that year.

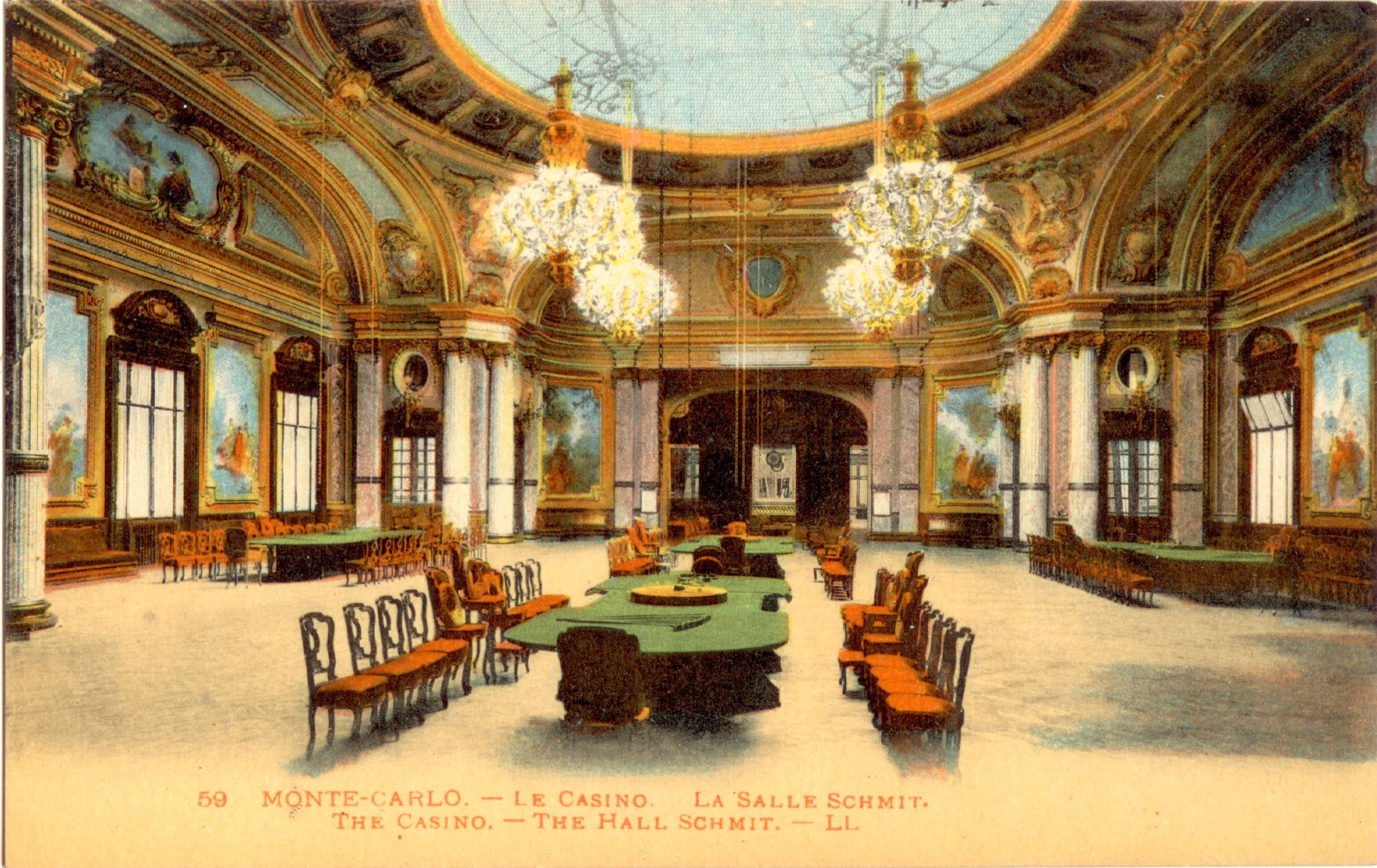
An interior view of the casino at Monte Carlo c. 1900

At the start of each day, every gaming table in the casino was funded with a cash reserve of 100,000 francs – known as "the bank". If a gambler won very large amounts, and this reserve was insufficient to pay the winnings, play at that table was suspended while extra funds were brought from the casino's vaults. A ceremony was devised by François Blanc, the former owner of the casino: a black cloth was laid over the table in question, and the successful player was said to have broken the bank. After an interval, the table was re-opened and play continued. (François Blanc had died in 1877 and his son, Camille Blanc, was head of the casino at the time of Charles Wells' 1891 visits).

Considerable speculation developed concerning Wells' achievements. Some newspapers dismissed his wins as a publicity stunt, but Wells claimed to have used an "infallible system" he had perfected, and his past record as a fraudster caused many observers to believe that he had somehow found a way to cheat the casino (another possibility being that he was simply exceptionally lucky on these particular visits).

== Later career ==
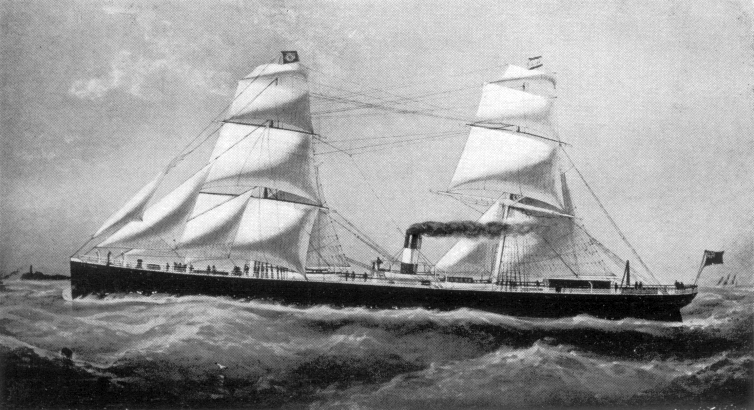
Steam yacht Palais Royal (formerly Tycho Brahe)

He used some of the money he won to purchase a ship, the Tycho Brahe, which he renamed the Palais Royal. He converted this into an unusually large luxury yacht, with sumptuous accommodation which included a ballroom large enough for fifty guests. After his initial wins, he returned to Monte Carlo again in January 1892, but lost about 100,000 francs. No credible evidence can be found to suggest that he ever repeated his earlier wins, though he would later claim to have won a further £2,500 in August 1910.

In late 1892, he was arrested at Le Havre aboard his yacht, the Palais Royal, and extradited to Britain to be charged for crimes associated with his patent scheme. He was tried at the Old Bailey in March 1893, found guilty on 23 counts of fraud and sentenced to eight years imprisonment, which he served in Portland Prison. He was released after six years due to good behaviour, though on one occasion he received two-days solitary confinement for giving a ten-ounce loaf of bread to another prisoner. Shortly before his release he played 'The Man who Broke the Bank at Monte Carlo' and 'Home Sweet Home' on the organ of Portland's Roman Catholic Chapel.

=== Major fraud in Paris ===
In 1910, using the alias of "Lucien Rivier", he established a private bank in Paris, and promised to pay interest at 365% per annum (1% per day). Some 6,000 investors deposited a total of 2m francs (about £7m presently). Existing customers were paid out of the new investments which "Rivier" received in ever-increasing amounts. (Charles Ponzi, after whom such schemes came to be known, perpetrated an almost identical fraud in the United States a decade later, offering a return of 100% every 90 days.)

When the French authorities began to investigate his affairs, Charles Wells fled to Britain with his clients' money. The scam was remarkable for its scale, both in terms of the number of investors who lost money and the amount of their total losses, and the Sûreté accordingly mounted a determined operation to find who "Lucien Rivier" was, and bring him to justice. He was finally traced to Britain and was arrested in January 1912. A court in Paris sentenced him in November 1912 to five years in prison. As a direct result of his crime, the French government introduced controls on private banks, with a strict vetting procedure for their owners.

== Death ==
Reports vary as to the location of Wells' death. Most state that he died in Paris, but no good evidence for this has been found. Sources also differ concerning the year of his death, though the majority give this as 1922.

He was buried in London in North Sheen Cemetery.

== Fame ==
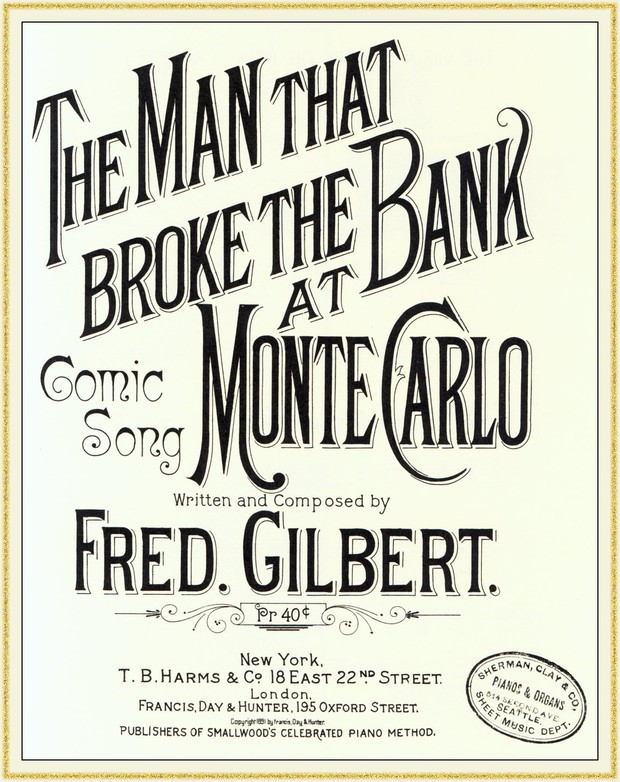
Sheet music for Fred Gilbert's music hall song "The Man who Broke the Bank at Monte Carlo"

Wells' exploits inspired Fred Gilbert to write a popular song, "The Man Who Broke the Bank at Monte Carlo". Other people had broken the bank before Wells, but it is probable that this song played a major part in making him famous. Subsequent reports in the press and even in the House of Commons refer to him as "Monte Carlo Wells". A biography of Charles Wells was published in 2016: The Man who Broke the Bank at Monte Carlo: Charles Deville Wells, Gambler and Fraudster Extraordinaire.

=== In culture ===
In 1935, a film was released named The Man Who Broke the Bank at Monte Carlo, and in 1983, Michael Butterworth wrote a book of the same name. In 1988, a farcical musical play entitled Lucky Stiff, based on Mr. Butterworth's book, opened in New York off-Broadway. However, these fictional accounts were based only vaguely on Wells' exploits.

== Bibliography ==
- Quinn, Robin (1 August 2016). The Man Who Broke the Bank at Monte Carlo: Charles De Ville Wells, Gambler and Fraudster Extraordinaire. The History Press. ISBN 978-0-7509-6177-6.
