= Nathaniel Tilton =

Nathaniel Tilton (born October 8, 1972) is an American former professional blackjack player, author of The Blackjack Life (Huntington Press, 2012), and Certified Financial Planner.

== Blackjack ==
Tilton was introduced to card counting by reading the books Bringing Down the House and Busting Vegas by Ben Mezrich, which later served as the inspiration for the movie 21. In 2005, Tilton enrolled in a private instructional program offered by Semyon Dukach, the former MIT Blackjack team manager who was featured in Busting Vegas. There, Tilton also met fellow attendee, D.A., and the two developed into skilled blackjack professionals. Beginning in 2006, they received additional mentorship from Mike Aponte ("MIT Mike"), another member of the MIT Blackjack team, who was the basis for one of the main characters, Jason Fisher, in Bringing Down the House. Mike Aponte, winner of the World Series of Blackjack, further groomed the pair into world-class players. The meticulous training process included requiring them to pass the MIT Blackjack team's rigorous Big Player test (the "BP Checkout"). From 2007-2012, Tilton and D.A. went on to flourish independently as a two-person team, melding a variety of playing methodologies together into a multi-strategic approach to blackjack advantage play.

== Book ==
In The Blackjack Life, Tilton outlines the skills required to effectively count cards, the development of his multi-strategic methodology, sustainability tactics for small team advantage play, and a personal narrative of his journey as an expert blackjack player.

== Accolades ==
Tilton has been featured in a variety of media outlets, including Gambling With an Edge, The 207, House of Cards Radio, The POGG, Seacoast Online, Card Player Magazine, Blackjack Insider, Cigar Aficianado, and The Daily News of Newburyport. In 2022, Tilton was a contributor to the book, Tales from the Felt: An Anthology, published by Colin Jones, a coffee table book in which 21 professional card counters go on the record to share their first-person tales of their playing experiences.

== Career ==
Tilton began his career in sports business in 1994, where he worked with professional teams including the Cleveland Indians and the Cleveland Cavaliers. In 2001, Tilton left sports for a career in financial planning with American Express Financial Advisors. In 2006, he became an independent advisor. Tilton owns and operates Tilton Wealth Management.

== Personal life ==
Tilton grew up in Kennebunk, Maine and later attended the University of New Hampshire, where he graduated in 1994 with a degree in Sport Management. Tilton is a member of Mensa International. He currently resides in Newburyport, Massachusetts.
