= David Irvine (blackjack player) =

American engineer and blackjack player

- Born: 1970 (age 54–55)
- Education: Massachusetts Institute of Technology; Cornell University; Purdue University
- Occupation(s): Engineer, blackjack player
- Known for: Member of the MIT Blackjack Team

David Irvine (born 1970) is an engineer and professional blackjack player and a former member of the MIT Blackjack Team. Irvine was a part of the blackjack team featured in the best selling book, Bringing Down the House, by Ben Mezrich. Irvine was one of the members of a team of MIT students that won millions at blackjack tables around the world by counting cards. The story of the MIT Blackjack Team was made into a major motion picture, 21, which was released in theaters on March 28, 2008. In 2004, Irvine co-founded a company called the Blackjack Institute with business partner Mike Aponte that provides instructional products and services on how to win at blackjack. Irvine has spoken at various events describing his experiences with the team, including the Global Gaming Expo Conference in 2007, the Chicago University Private Equity Network in 2006, among other events. Irvine is also the co-owner of an engineering consulting company called SBR Technologies, Inc. that focuses on the use of a wastewater treatment process called the sequencing batch reactor.

Irvine lives in Naples, Florida, but grew up in Granger, Indiana, and attended Penn High School in nearby Mishawaka, Indiana, graduating in 1989. Irvine later graduated from the Massachusetts Institute of Technology, earning a Bachelor of Science degree in Mechanical Engineering, before completing a master's degree from Cornell University in 1997 and an M.B.A. from Purdue University in 2002.
