= Andy Bloch =

American poker player (born 1969)

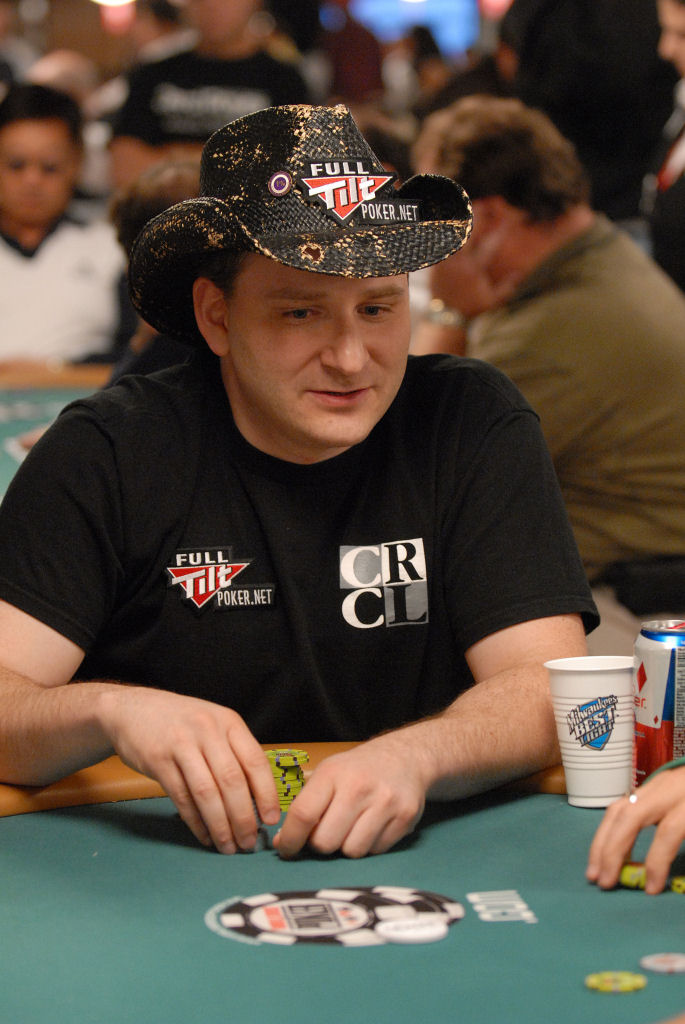
- Bloch in the 2007 World Series of Poker
- Born: June 1, 1969 (age 57); New Haven, Connecticut, U.S.

World Series of Poker
- Bracelet: 1
- Money finishes: 29
- Highest WSOP Main Event finish: None

World Poker Tour
- Title: None
- Final tables: 2
- Money finishes: 8

Andrew Elliot Bloch (born June 1, 1969) is an American professional poker player. He holds two electrical engineering degrees from MIT and a JD from Harvard Law School.

== Blackjack ==
While studying at MIT, Bloch became part of the MIT blackjack team, featured in the book Bringing Down the House. Bloch said he has made up to $100,000 in one session while playing blackjack. He was one of the members of the team to play in Monte Carlo as detailed in Ben Mezrich's Busting Vegas.

Bloch was featured in the blackjack documentary The Hot Shoe, as well as starring in his own instructional blackjack DVD, Beating Blackjack, which explains card counting.

== Poker career ==
Bloch started playing poker seriously in 1992, entering some small $35 weekly tournaments once a month. By the end of the year, he had won one of the World Poker Finals tournaments in Mashantucket, a $100 entry fee no-limit Texas hold'em tournament.

In 1997, Bloch skipped the last week of law school classes to play in the World Series of Poker (WSOP) Main Event. He was the guinea pig in a low-tech hole card cam trial. Tom Sims was looking for a volunteer to "sweat" and record all his hole cards, and Bloch agreed. His records turned into a two-part CardPlayer Magazine article. After passing the bar exam in 1999, Bloch decided to delay his law career and went back to playing poker.

His law career got delayed even further after making two WSOP final tables in 2001, a first-place finish back at Foxwoods in 2002 (playing seven-card stud), and two World Poker Tour (WPT) final tables during its first season, finishing third both times. In 2005, Bloch chose to boycott the WPT in protest of its player release process. Bloch returned to the WPT after a lawsuit initiated by seven high-profile poker players, including Chris Ferguson and Phil Gordon, was settled in 2008.

Bloch was the second season winner of the Ultimate Poker Challenge.

He was a member of "Team Full Tilt" at Full Tilt Poker prior to the site closing down.

At the 2006 World Series of Poker, Bloch finished second in the $50,000 H.O.R.S.E. event against David "Chip" Reese. The heads-up battle lasted 286 hands and was the longest recorded in WSOP history.

In 2006, he defeated Phil Laak heads up to win the Pro-Am Poker Equalizer, taking the grand prize of $500,000. The tournament was broadcast in early 2007 on ESPN.

In March 2008, Bloch finished runner-up to Chris Ferguson in the NBC National Heads-Up Poker Championship. He would defeat Ferguson later that year in Season 5 of Poker After Dark.

Bloch finished runner-up to Nenad Medić in the $10,000 Pot-Limit Hold'em World Championship at the 2008 World Series of Poker, earning $488,048. He finished in 3rd in the 2012 WSOP Poker Players Championship for $561,738.

As of 2023, his total live tournament winnings exceed $5,300,000. His 24 cashes at the WSOP account for $2,149,821 of those winnings.

Bloch won his first WSOP bracelet on June 2, 2012, in a $1,500 Seven Card Stud event. The event started with 367 players and ended with a final table that included David Williams and Barry Greenstein. He defeated Greenstein in heads-up play to win the bracelet and $126,363.

== World Series of Poker bracelet ==
Year	Tournament	Prize (US$)
2012	$1,500 Seven Card Stud	$126,363

== Charities ==
Bloch donated 100% of his winnings on Full Tilt Poker to various charities around the world. After qualifying for the 2006 World Series of Poker Main Event via a tournament on the website, Bloch decided that any money he won in the event would go directly to charity. He is also contributing $100,000 of his winnings from the Pro-Am Equalizer to charities working in Darfur.
