= Mike Aponte =

Manager of an MIT blackjack team

- Other name: MIT Mike
- Education: Massachusetts Institute of Technology
- Occupation: Blackjack player

Mike Aponte, also known as MIT Mike, is a professional blackjack player and a former member of the MIT Blackjack Team. Aponte was part of a team of Massachusetts Institute of Technology (MIT) students that legally won millions playing blackjack at casinos around the world by counting cards. He is the basis for one of the main characters, Jason Fisher, in the book, Bringing Down the House, by Ben Mezrich, which inspired the motion picture, 21.

== Early years ==
Growing up Aponte rarely played cards. He was the son of a U.S. Army tactical instructor, and his family moved on a regular basis, both within the United States and overseas. He attended 11 different schools before graduating valedictorian from Ewing High School in New Jersey. That fall, he moved to Boston to attend MIT, where he studied economics and played on the school's football team. In his senior year a friend told him about a team at MIT that used special mathematical techniques to win at blackjack.

In an interview with All In magazine, Mike recalled: “When I attended my first blackjack team meeting I was completely hooked. I was fascinated by the mathematics of card counting and of course the lure of big money and the high roller lifestyle. I was highly motivated to learn card counting and I practiced hard to develop my skills.”

== Blackjack ==
Aponte first played as a member of the MIT Blackjack Team in 1992, after passing the team's big player test (the BP "checkout"). In the big player team strategy, it is the BP that comes in and capitalizes on the advantage with big bets after spotters have identified a "hot shoe" with a favorable count. Aponte was one of the team's most successful big players, and was also the team's manager, responsible for recruiting and training new players, as well as coordinating team trips.

Until 2000, Aponte and his colleagues achieved substantial success at casinos in the United States and other countries as well, eventually earning millions of dollars. The team practiced rigorously, maintained an intense travel schedule and planned their blackjack operations meticulously.

After his professional card counting career, Aponte went on to win the World Series of Blackjack championship in 2004, and co-founded a company that provides instructional products on how to win at blackjack. Mike has coached several notable players including Nathaniel Tilton, author of The Blackjack Life and his playing partner "D.A.". In 2007 Aponte became the first blackjack player ever to be depicted on a trading card in Topps' Allen & Ginter set. He now coaches blackjack, and speaks at universities and corporations.
