= Front-loading =

Front-Loading may refer to:

- United_States_presidential_primary#Front-loading, a trend of moving primaries earlier in the calendar
- Washing machine#Front-loading, front loading type of washing machine
- Revolver#Front-loading_cylinder, a type of revolver
- Hole_carding#Front-loading, a strategy to observe a hidden card in a card game
