= The Hot Shoe =

2004 documentary film

- Directed by: David Layton
- Release date: 2004

The Hot Shoe is a 2004 documentary film which also reveals the history and development of card counting. Director David Layton interviewed current and former card counters, including members of the MIT Blackjack Team, casino employees and gambling authors, and combined it with behind-the-scenes footage of casino surveillance rooms and the MIT team preparing to hit the tables. Layton learned how to count cards and gambled with $5,000 of the film's budget as a "case study." The film reviews the mathematical aspects of card counting and key elements for winning blackjack.

Blackjack players interviewed for The Hot Shoe include:

- Ian Andersen
- Andy Bloch
- Anthony Curtis
- Peter Griffin
- Tommy Hyland
- Max Rubin
- Ralph Stricker
- Edward Thorp
- Olaf Vancura
- Stanford Wong
