= Church Team =

Card counting blackjack team

The Church Team was a card counting blackjack team that operated from 2005 to 2011. It was started and managed by Ben Crawford and Colin Jones. Over the years the team included approximately 30 investors, 40 players, and various levels of managers and trainers. The team was primarily based out of the Seattle area but had almost 15 players from the Cincinnati area as well as players from California, NY, Oregon and Nevada. The team, at its highest point, was playing with $1.2 million of investors money and in the course of the 6 years won more than $3 million from casinos. The team would come together and meet quarterly in the Seattle area to discuss goals, business model changes, introduce new players, and test old players out.

The group's story is the subject of Holy Rollers: The True Story of Card Counting Christians, directed by a former member of the group, Bryan Storkel. The Church Team officially disbanded after 6 years in 2011.

Ben Crawford was arrested for child abuse in August of 2024.
