= Counting cards =

Counting cards may refer to:

- Card counting, the process of counting the cards in gambling games
- Counting card (cards), those cards which have an intrinsic scoring value in card games
