= SMTP, Inc. =

Provider of transactional email relay services

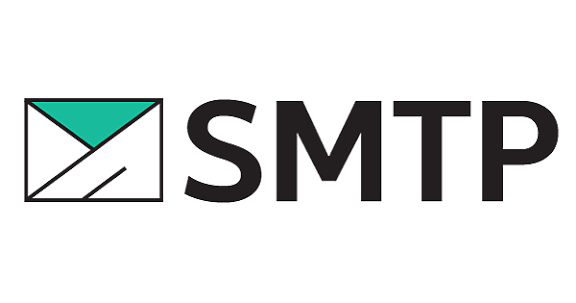
- Type: Subsidiary
- Industry: Email Marketing
- Founded: 1998; 28 years ago
- Founder: Matt Mankins
- Headquarters: Ottawa, Ontario, Canada
- Products: Email relay service
- Parent: J2 Global
- Website: www.smtp.com

SMTP, Inc. is a Canadian company that provides transactional email relay services for marketing purposes. It specializes in sending outgoing email for large volume senders avoiding spam and reputational damage.

== History ==
The company was founded as EMUmail Inc. in 1998 by Matt Mankins. Three years later Mankins sold EMUmail to the software development company AccuRev. About a year later, former AccuRev CEO and EMUmail board member Semyon Dukach bought EMUmail.

In 2005, Lux Scientiae bought the EMUmail outsourcing services business, leaving the SMTP.com email delivery service as the company’s core offering.

The company changed its name to SMTP, Inc. in November 2010. SMTP filed an initial public offering (IPO) and began trading on the OTC Bulletin Board as (OTCBB: SMTP) on May 2, 2011, and then on the Nasdaq Capital Market on January 31, 2014.

SMTP has acquired PreviewMyEmail.com service for online email content preview from a Turkish company Octeth in exchange for $160,000 cash on January 10, 2013.

Jonathan M. Strimling has been appointed CEO by SMTP's Board of Directors on August 15, 2013.

SMTP acquired SharpSpring.Inc., a marketing automation company, in 2014 and the company was renamed as SharpSpring (SHSP). In 2016, SharpSpring sold SMTP to the Electric Mail Company.

== Services ==
SMTP, Inc. is a cloud service provider that specializes in sending outgoing email for large volume senders. In this regard SMTP is more akin to technology service providers such as Amazon.com or Rackspace than to email marketing companies such as Constant Contact. SMTP also offers related services such as tracking and reporting, reputation management, statistical analysis and expert support.

SMTP also provides tools for checking a domain’s DKIM records in DNS as well as for checking forward-confirmed reverse DNS (FCdDNS) for an IP.

The SMTP email delivery service requires that the emails are generated locally from a locally-kept emailing list.

SMTP runs its own redundant data center in the Hurricane Electric and XO Communications facility in Fremont, California.
