= Jeff Ma =

American blackjack player

- Born: 1973 (age 52–53)
- Education: Massachusetts Institute of Technology
- Occupations: Chief Digital Officer, Troon
- Notable work: The House Advantage: Playing the Odds to Win Big In Business

Jeffrey Ma (born 1973) is a former member of the MIT Blackjack Team in the mid-1990s. He graduated from Phillips Exeter Academy. He attended MIT where he graduated with a degree in mechanical engineering in 1994. He was the basis for the main character of the book Bringing Down the House (where he was renamed Kevin Lewis) and the film 21 (where he was renamed Ben Campbell). Ma also co-founded PROTRADE (a sports stock market website that has since been shut down) and does consulting work for professional sports teams including the Portland Trail Blazers and San Francisco 49ers. He cofounded Citizen Sports, a sport-information website and iPhone application based in San Francisco, which was acquired by Yahoo! in May 2010.

His first book, The House Advantage: Playing the Odds to Win Big In Business, was published in July 2010 by Palgrave Macmillan. Ma is a regular speaker at corporate events and conferences where he talks about how to use data and analytics to make better business decisions. He made a cameo in the film 21 as a blackjack dealer named Jeffrey at the Planet Hollywood Resort and Casino. Jim Sturgess's character, Ben Campbell, refers to Jeffrey as "my brother from another mother." He is the CEO and Founder of tenXer, a San Francisco-based startup, with the vision to "make work better and your work better". tenXer was sold to Twitter now X, in April 2015.

Ma joined ESPN in November 2014 as their Predictive Analytics Expert. Per this arrangement, he does weekly TV appearances on SportsCenter and contributes as a writer on ESPN.com. In 2017, he started the Bet the Process podcast, a "sports gambling and analytics podcast," and began appearing on The Tony Kornheiser Show podcast, picking college and NFL football games. In November 2018, Ma was appointed Senior Vice President of Product and Analytics at Duetto.

In May 2020, Ma became Vice President for Microsoft for Startups, a unit focused on recruiting startups to use Microsoft technologies.

As of 2024, Ma is the Chief Digital Officer at Troon, the largest golf and club-related hospitality management company in the world in terms of number of clubs managed.
