= Colin Jones (blackjack player) =

American blackjack gambler

Colin Jones is an American blackjack card-counting expert, teacher, and entrepreneur. He was a founder and manager of The Church Team, a successful blackjack card-counting team based in Seattle, Washington, which won approximately 3.2 million dollars from casinos between 2006 and 2011. Jones is featured prominently in the 2011 award-winning documentary, Holy Rollers: The True Story of Card Counting Christians. He owns the website Blackjack Apprenticeship and holds regular blackjack boot camps in Las Vegas.

== Education ==
In 2002, Jones graduated with a bachelor's degree in math from Azusa Pacific University. While in college, his friend, Ben Crawford, recommended he read a book about card counting. Jones read it, practiced at home, and then tested the strategies in the casinos. After feeling confident in the math, he asked his wife if he could use $2,000 from their savings. She agreed and he used that money to begin his career playing blackjack.

Jones saw card-counting as a way to put his math skills to good use, and does not consider it gambling. In an interview with the Pittsburgh Tribune-Review, he claimed, “I’ve never gambled in my life. I’ve only been in casinos since I knew how to beat the game.”

== The Church Team: Card-counting as a business ==
Initially, Jones and Crawford attempted to discourage others from joining them, but eventually decided to create a team of individuals who were trustworthy, hard-working, and skilled at card counting. The Church Team got its name because most of the original members were from Jones’ and Crawford's church networks; many were regular church attenders, pastors, and theology students. At its peak, The Church Team had about 30 investors and 40 playing members.

Jones and Crawford registered their team as an official business and called it Advantage Play, LLC. The members of the team underwent regular skills test, had quarterly meetings, and recruited investors. They trained every team member to understand that every decision, including leaving a table, making a bet, and tipping a dealer, should have a justified business reason.

Although Jones and Crawford spent some time learning Halves and Hi-Opt II, they settled on using the Hi-Lo counting system. They preferred a simple system in which they could carry on a conversation with casino officials, play, and keep count all at the same time.

Travelling to various casinos throughout the United States and Canada, the members sometimes carried tens of thousands of dollars, sometimes over $100,000, in their pockets or strapped to their bodies. Sometimes members dressed in costumes to conceal their identities. Jones and Crawford trained their members to give honest answers when confronted by security guards and law enforcement.

The team pooled their winnings and the money was distributed to players and investors according to contract agreements and various motivational incentives.

In 2011, The Church Team disbanded when it became “less fun and less profitable.” Eventually many casinos caught on, and banned members from playing their tables.

== Documentary release ==
In 2011, Bryan Storkel directed a documentary about The Church Team called Holy Rollers: The True Story of Card Counting Christians. The documentary follows Jones, Ben Crawford, and their team, chronicling their card counting adventures. Their story was subsequently covered and reviewed by many high-profile media outlets. On March 9, 2012, Jones was interviewed for an article in The New York Times. On April 2, 2012, The Church Team's story was discussed on The Colbert Report, episode: “Yahweh or No Way: Christian Card Counters, Pope Benedict on Marxism & Pope Cologne.” On June 8, 2012, Jones was interviewed by NPR's Ira Glass and Robyn Semien in episode 466: “Render Unto Caesar’s Palace What is Due Caesar’s Palace.”

== Blackjack apprenticeship ==
In 2008, Jones and Crawford created a website, Blackjack Apprenticeship, to train others to count cards. Jones also holds blackjack boot camps in Las Vegas. https://www.blackjackapprenticeship.com/
