= American Dreamz =

- Theatrical release poster
- Directed by: Paul Weitz
- Written by: Paul Weitz
- Produced by: Paul Weitz; Chris Weitz
- Starring: Hugh Grant; Dennis Quaid; Mandy Moore; Marcia Gay Harden; Chris Klein; Jennifer Coolidge; Willem Dafoe
- Cinematography: Robert Elswit
- Edited by: Myron Kerstein
- Music by: Stephen Trask
- Production company: Depth of Field
- Distributed by: Universal Pictures
- Release date: April 21, 2006
- Running time: 107 minutes
- Country: United States
- Language: English
- Budget: $17 million
- Box office: $16.5 million

American Dreamz is a 2006 American comedy film directed by Paul Weitz. Described as a "cultural satire" by Weitz, the film satirizes both popular entertainment and American politics during the second George W. Bush administration.

== Plot ==
On the morning after his re-election, U.S. President Joseph Staton decides to read the newspaper for the first time in four years. This starts him down a slippery slope. He begins reading obsessively, reexamining his "black-and-white" view of the world in a more "gray-seeming" way, and holing up in his bedroom in his pajamas. Frightened by the President's apparent nervous breakdown, his Chief of Staff pushes him back into the spotlight, booking him as a guest judge on the television ratings juggernaut (and the President's wife's personal favorite) talent show American Dreamz. America cannot seem to get enough of American Dreamz, hosted by self-aggrandizing, self-loathing Martin Tweed, ever on the lookout for the next insta-celebrity. His latest crop of hopefuls includes Sally Kendoo, a conniving steel magnolia with a devoted, dopey veteran boyfriend William Williams, and Omer Obeidi.

Because Omer's mother died in the Middle East in an American attack, he joined a group of jihadists. He was an actor in an instruction film for terrorists, but he was too clumsy, and his interest in show tunes was frowned upon. Therefore, he was sent to the U.S. to await further instructions, but the leaders expected they could not use him. He moved to Southern California to live with his extended family there, including his effeminate cousin Iqbal and Shazzy. Iqbal hoped to be selected to participate in American Dreamz, but in a misunderstanding, Omer was selected instead. Iqbal becomes angered by this at first but later agrees to help Omer win and makes himself his manager.

Omer's terrorist organization now sees an opportunity: Omer is instructed to make it to the finale, and kill the president in a suicide attack. He succeeds in getting to the finale. Security is bypassed by assembling the bomb after the security check, in the toilet, from small parts smuggled in (the smaller pieces of explosive are disguised as chewing gum). Omer agrees, but changes his mind and disposes of the bomb in the trash can.

Sally is the other finalist. Earlier in the film, she had dumped William because she believed that her life would've gone nowhere if she still had him for a boyfriend and that he'd only drag her down. This drove William to join the army, only to be wounded in Iraq and sent back to the U.S. For the purpose of the show and at the insistence of her agent, Chet Krogl, Sally has to pretend that she still loves William. On the eve of the American Dreamz finale, William proposes to Sally, which she rejects until Chet decides to boost Sally's popularity and chances of winning the show by asking William to do the proposal on air. However, William witnesses Sally having sex with Martin, and is furious. When he throws out the engagement ring, he finds the bomb Omer tossed in the trash can. He then comes out on stage and threatens to detonate it. While the other people evacuate, William starts singing and Martin, who refuses to let go of the camera, films it. As William reaches the end of the song, he detonates the bomb by walking into the camera, killing both himself and Martin. The film then cuts to shots of people dialing up their cell phones to vote in for the winner. It is eventually revealed that William Williams was voted the surprise winner of American Dreamz.

The epilogue reveals what each of the characters went on to do after the end of last season. Omer went on to become a successful star of his own Broadway revue, where he is shown performing a scene from the musical Grease, the President makes his wife his new chief of staff and Sally Kendoo becomes the new host of American Dreamz.

== Cast ==
- Hugh Grant as Martin "Tweedy" Tweed
- Dennis Quaid as President Joseph Staton
- Marcia Gay Harden as First Lady
- Willem Dafoe as Chief of Staff
- Mandy Moore as Sally Kendoo
- Chris Klein as William Williams
- Jennifer Coolidge as Martha Kendoo
- Sam Golzari as Omer Obeidi
- Seth Meyers as Chet Krogl
- Judy Greer as Deborah Accordo
- John Cho as Frank Ittles
- Tony Yalda as Iqbal Riza
- Noureen DeWulf as Shabnam "Shazzy" Riza
- Shohreh Aghdashloo as Nazneen Riza
- Adam Busch as Sholem Glickstein
- Jeff Ross as American Dreamz finale pre-show announcer (uncredited)

== Production ==
In May 2005, it was announced Paul and Chris Weitz would produce American Dreamz, a satire of American politics and show business, through their production company Depth of Field.

=== Writing ===
Although the singing contest depicted in the film has been interpreted as a direct satire of American Idol, Paul Weitz said in an interview that the similarities are almost accidental, and that the showrunner is not based on Simon Cowell but on Hugh Grant himself: "a depressive, morbid but really funny, cynical guy ... too egotistical to have any other judges so it's just him kind of projected up on screen judging the contestants". Weitz went on to call the film a cultural rather than a political satire.

== Reception ==
=== Box office ===
American Dreamz grossed $7.2 million in the United States, and $9.5 million in other territories, for a worldwide total gross of $16.7 million.

The film opened on April 21, 2006, and made $3.7 million in its first weekend, placing ninth.

In the Netherlands, the film debuted at #7, dropping to #10 in its second week. As of June 14, 2006, the film has grossed a total of €92,432 in the Netherlands. In Spain, the film debuted at #11, earning $109,681 in 50 theatres. The following week it dropped to #15, grossing $58,467.

=== Critical response ===
On review website Rotten Tomatoes, the film holds an approval rating of 39% based on 182 reviews, with an average rating of 5.3/10. The website's critics consensus reads: "A cheerfully silly satire with an unfortunate lack of focus, American Dreamz takes aim at numerous targets, but isn't pointed enough for relevant social commentary." On Metacritic, the film has a weighted average score of 45 out of 100, based on reviews from 37 critics, indicating "mixed or average" reviews. Audiences polled by CinemaScore gave the film an average grade of "C−" on an A+ to F scale.

Giving the film a C+ in her review, Rebecca Murray writes that Weiz tried to do too much: "Simply put, American Dreamz suffers from an overabundance of subplots and characters. There's so much going on, the comedy can't survive the film's scattershot approach." Leonard Maltin in his book 151 Best Movies You've Never Seen says director "Weitz holds a mirror up to American society and uses humor to help us see ourselves at our best, and at our worst."

== Soundtrack ==
The film's soundtrack was released April 18, 2006 by Lakeshore Records.

1. "Stars and Stripes Forever"
2. "One" — Sam Golzari (from A Chorus Line)
3. "Luck Be a Lady" — Sam Golzari (from Guys and Dolls)
4. "Impossible Dream" — Sam Golzari (from Man of La Mancha)
5. "My Way" — Sam Golzari
6. "Greased Lightnin'" — Sam Golzari (from Grease)
7. "Super Freak" — Rick James
8. "That's Entertainment" — The Jam
9. "Nights in White Satin" — The Moody Blues
10. "Mommy Don't Drink Me to Bed Tonight" — Mandy Moore
11. "(Girl) Let's Not Be Friends" — Joshua Wade
12. "Rockin' Man" — Trey Parker
13. "Never Felt This Way Before" — Niki J. Crawford
14. "Lez Git Raunchy" — Adam Busch
15. "Dreams with a Z" — Mandy Moore
16. "Tea Time" — Joe Lervold
17. "Trail of Love" — The Razen Shadows feat. Teresa James
18. "Riza" — Pedro Eustache, Paul Livingstone, Faisal Zedan, Wael Kakish, and Donavon Lerman

== Home media ==
American Dreamz was released on DVD in the United Kingdom on July 2, 2006, and was released in the United States on October 17, 2006. It was released in Australia later that year.
