= Semyon Dukach =

Ukrainian American investor, professional blackjack player, and entrepreneur

- Born: 25 October 1968 (age 58); Moscow, Soviet Union
- Education: Columbia University; Massachusetts Institute of Technology
- Occupations: Venture capitalist, angel investor, entrepreneur

Semyon Dukach (born 25 October 1968) is an American entrepreneur and former professional blackjack player. He is the founding partner of One Way Ventures, a venture capital fund that backs immigrant entrepreneurs.

He was the managing director of Techstars in Boston. He was also the chairman of SMTP, Inc., and a former professional blackjack player with the MIT Blackjack Team. He played with Strategic Investments and later was one of the founding members and team leaders on Amphibian Investments whose exploits were chronicled in Ben Mezrich's Busting Vegas and referred to in Mezrich's Bringing Down the House. Dukach was the main character in Busting Vegas and the only member of the MIT blackjack team to be referred to by his real name in either book.

== Early life ==
Born on 25 October 1968 in Moscow, Dukach moved to the US in 1979 at the age of 11. He completed a BS in Computer Science at Columbia University in 1990 and a MS in Computer Science at MIT in 1993.

At a young age Semyon developed an interest in video games and specifically Pac-Man. Semyon became proficient at the game by reading Ken Uston's Mastering PAC-MAN. This led him to read Uston's other titles on blackjack, giving him an understanding of the basics of card counting before he was approached to play with the MIT Blackjack Team.

== Blackjack career ==
While attending MIT, Dukach was trained as a player on the MIT Blackjack team whose exploits were loosely depicted in the Hollywood movie 21.

Starting out with Strategic Investments (SI) in 1992, Dukach was a major player on the team. At the end of 1993 SI dissolved and Semyon was involved in a team effort with the remaining players from SI for the next year. By 1995 Dukach and a few players split off from that team and formed a second, independent team. This new team was referred to as the Amphibians and the team that they left was referred to as the Reptiles.

Since stopping play in the late 1990s, Dukach's involvement in blackjack has been limited.

== Angel investing and Techstars ==
Dukach is an angel investor. In 2014, Dukach assumed the role of managing director of Techstars in Boston. He ran the program for three years before leaving in 2017 to found One Way Ventures, a venture capital fund for exceptional immigrant founders.

== Venture capital ==
Dukach co-founded One Way Ventures in 2017 and currently serves as a managing partner. One Way Ventures is an early-stage venture capital fund that focuses on investing in startups with at least one immigrant founder on the team. The fund is based in Boston, Massachusetts. The firm focuses on tech-enabled startups in the Pre-seed to Series A stages, and has made investments in startups including Brex, LovePop, and Chipper Cash.

== Other ventures ==
He has also been involved in other ventures outside of his blackjack and angel investing career:

- Authored work on virtual reality at IBM Research in 1988
- Authored a 1992 e-commerce paper on SNPP: A Simple Network Payment Protocol
- Founded Fast Engines in 1997, sold to Adero in 2000
- Co-founded Vert in 1998
- Lead investor and interim CEO of AccuRev in 2001
- Chairman of SMTP, Inc., a Nasdaq listed provider of email delivery services.
- Co-founded PDFfiller
- Was a CEO mentor at the Cambridge Business Development Center
- Board director of Terrafugia
- Founded the Troublemaker Award, granted to Zack Kopplin in 2012, to Nadezhda Tolokonnikova of Pussy Riot in 2013, and to Mustang Wanted in 2014 for creative troublemaking that improves the world.
- Director, Boston TechStars, 2014-2017.
- Co-founded CashForRefugees in February 2022 to deliver direct cash grants to war refugees in Ukraine.
