= Busting Vegas =

Book by Ben Mezrich

- Hardcover edition
- Author: Ben Mezrich
- Language: English
- Subject: Gambling
- Genre: Non-fiction †
- Publisher: William Morrow and Company
- Publication date: September 27, 2005
- Publication place: United States
- Media type: Print, e-book
- ISBN: 0-060-57511-5
- Preceded by: Bringing Down the House

Busting Vegas (stylized as Busting Vega$) is a 2005 book by Ben Mezrich about a group of MIT card counters and blackjack players commonly known as the MIT Blackjack Team. The subtitle of the original, hardcover edition was The MIT Whiz Kid Who Brought the Casinos to Their Knees, but the subtitle of the subsequent paperback editions was A True Story of Monumental Excess, Sex, Love, Violence, and Beating the Odds.

While represented as non-fiction by Mezrich, the book contains significant fictional elements. The book is a sequel to Bringing Down the House; however, the team discussed in Busting Vegas were primarily active prior to the team discussed in Bringing Down the House.

== Synopsis ==
The book's protagonist, Semyon Dukach, is recruited by team leader Victor Cassius while attending MIT to play on a highly specialized blackjack team. They employ advanced advantage play strategies like card steering and Ace sequencing. The team deals with the crises of success, and one of the players develops a substance abuse problem that will ultimately prove their downfall. An aggressive investigation by casinos into the teams' various false identities forces them to travel outside of America to continue play, culminating in a high tension climax in Monte Carlo after being caught steering cards.

== Characters ==
=== Semyon Dukach ===
Semyon Dukach is a real person and MIT alum. The story is primarily based on his experiences and told from his perspective.

=== Victor Cassius ===
Victor Cassius is a composite character. Many of the events involving Victor appear to be drawn from the experiences of Johnny Chang including the plane crash detailed at the start of the book.

=== Allie Simpson ===
Another composite character at least partly based on an MIT team member known only as 'Katie' who appeared in the History Channel documentary 'Breaking Vegas'.

== Factual inaccuracies ==
- The team never got robbed by a casino executive on a golf course in Aruba. This story is allegedly based on the experiences of one of Johnny Chang's associates.
- Semyon was not abducted at gunpoint outside a casino in Atlantic City. This story was based on an experience he had while working delivering pizzas in Houston, and had no connection to blackjack or gambling.
- The team that played in Monte Carlo consisted of Semyon, Andy Bloch and Katie.
- Semyon did reach out to a casino private investigator to help locate a teammate, but not due to drug use.
- There was no player on the team with whom Semyon had a romantic relationship. In fact he was married with a child at the time of the events in the book.
- Semyon did not at any point meet Ben Mezrich in a brothel.
- Ben Mezrich did not learn or use these techniques himself. Semyon demonstrated steering a 10 card for him once.
