= Get Shakes =

Dance group from England

- Origin: Isle of Wight
- Genres: Electro house, electroclash, dance-punk
- Years active: 2006–present
- Members: Matt Farrow; Darren Farrow
- Website: Official website

Get Shakes was an Isle of Wight-based electronic band founded by Matt and Darren Farrow in 2006.

== History ==
The group was founded by Matt and Darren Farrow in the Isle of Wight in 2006 and were originally known as "Shakes." The brothers previously were members of different bands, but found the most success working together. Paul Epworth and Norway-based Telle Records were among the first to notice Get Shakes, and Telle Records signed the group onto their "Hot! Hot! Hot!" imprint. Their initial success came through their single "Sister Self Doubt," which was released in summer of 2006 and featured on the soundtrack of the 2008 film 21. They released their second single "Disneyland" in 2007, and their double A-side single "Love Hate/She Found the Diamonds" in 2009. While a full-length debut was anticipated, the band has remained dormant since the release of that single.

== Musical style ==
Paul Lester called the Shakes a mixture of Oi! and electronic music, comparing them to the Klaxons, Hot Chip, CSS, and Mstrkrft. Hayley Fairclough of DIY noted influences of LCD Soundsystem and Death from Above 1979 in the band's sound, calling their style an acid house-influenced pop music. Fairclough noted their single "Love Hate" as "music to finish a bottle of rosé to before you head into town for the night." Wendy Roby of Drowned in Sound compared the band to !!!, calling them a "shinier, poppier preposition," and deeming that same single "proper, blippy disco."
