= MIT Blackjack Team =

Professional casino card counters

The MIT Blackjack Team was a group of students and ex-students from Massachusetts Institute of Technology, Harvard University, and other leading colleges who used card counting techniques and more sophisticated strategies to beat casinos at blackjack worldwide. The team and its successors operated successfully from 1979 through the beginning of the 21st century.

== Blackjack and card counting ==
Blackjack can be legally beaten by a skilled player. Beyond the basic strategy of when to hit and when to stand, individual players can use card counting, shuffle tracking, or hole carding to improve their odds. Since the early 1960s, a large number of card counting schemes have been published, and casinos have adjusted the rules of play in an attempt to counter the most popular methods. The idea behind all card counting is that, because a low card is usually bad and a high card usually good, and as cards already seen since the last shuffle cannot be at the top of the deck and thus drawn, the counter can determine the high and low cards that have already been played. They then may know the probability of getting a high card (10, J, Q, K, A) as compared to a low card (2, 3, 4, 5, 6).

== Early days ==
In 1979, several friends of J.P. Massar at MIT took a class on blackjack called "How to Gamble If You Must." They reported to Massar, then about to graduate with a master's degree in computer science, that the game was beatable. Using a mainframe computer at the Lincoln Lab in nearby Lexington, Massachusetts, Massar determined that by playing enough hands with enough players willing to signal others about their hands, it was possible for a player to win more hands than he would lose.

Massar and several others took a trip to Atlantic City, New Jersey during spring break to test the theory, but did not find success. The group went their separate ways when most of them graduated in May of the same year. Most never gambled again, but some of them maintained an avid interest in card counting and remained in Cambridge, Massachusetts. Two of them, J.P. Massar and Jonathan, offered a course on blackjack for MIT's January 1980 Independent Activities Period (IAP), during which classes may be offered on almost any subject.

In late November 1979, a professional blackjack player, "Dave", contacted Massar after seeing a flyer for Massar's blackjack course. He offered to bankroll a group to go to Atlantic City to take advantage of the New Jersey Casino Control Commission's recent ruling which prohibited the Atlantic City casinos from banning card counters. Casinos instead must take other countermeasures like shuffling the cards earlier than normal, using more decks of cards, or offering games with worse rules to destroy the advantage gained by counting—even though these all negatively impact the non-counter as well.

The group of four players, a professional gambler, and an investor who put up most of their capital ($5,000) went to Atlantic City in late December. They recruited more MIT students as players at the January blackjack class. They played intermittently through May 1980 and increased their capital four-fold, but were nonetheless more like a loose capital-sharing group than a team with consistent strategies and quality control.

In May 1980, Massar met Bill Kaplan at a Chinese restaurant in Cambridge. Kaplan had earned his BA at Harvard in 1977 and delayed his admission to Harvard Business School for a year, when he moved to Las Vegas and formed a blackjack team using his own research and statistical analysis of the game. Using funds he received on graduation as Harvard's outstanding scholar-athlete, he generated more than a 35-fold rate of return in less than nine months of play. Kaplan continued to run his Las Vegas blackjack team as a sideline while attending Harvard Business School but, by the time of his graduation in May 1980, the players were so "burnt out" in Nevada they were forced to hit the international circuit. Not feeling he could continue to manage the team successfully while they traveled throughout Europe and elsewhere, encountering different rules, playing conditions, and casino practices, Kaplan parted ways with his teammates, who then splintered into multiple small playing teams in pursuit of more favorable conditions throughout the world.

After meeting Kaplan and hearing about his blackjack successes, Massar asked Kaplan if he was interested in accompanying some of Massar's blackjack-playing friends to Atlantic City to observe their play. Given the serendipitous timing (Kaplan's parting with his Las Vegas team), he agreed to go in the hopes of putting together a new local team that he could train and manage. Kaplan observed Massar and his teammates playing for a weekend in Atlantic City. He noted that each of the players used a different, and overcomplicated, card counting strategy. It resulted in error rates that undermined the benefits of the more complicated strategies. After returning to Cambridge, Kaplan detailed the problems he observed to Massar.

Kaplan said he would back a team but it had to be run as a business with formal management procedures, a required counting and betting system, strict training and player approval processes, and careful tracking of all casino play. Two players were initially averse to the idea, lacking interest in learning a new playing system, being put through "trial by fire" checkout procedures before being approved to play, being supervised in the casinos, or having to fill out detailed player sheets (such as casino, cash in and cash out totals, time period, betting strategy and limits, and the rest) for every playing session. However, their keen interest in the game coupled with Kaplan's successful track record won out.

== Capitalization and growth (1980–1989) ==
The newly capitalized "bank" of the MIT Blackjack Team started on 1 August 1980. The investment stake was $89,000, with both outside investors and players putting up the capital. Ten players, including Kaplan, Massar, Jonathan, Goose, and "Big Dave" (aka "coach", to distinguish from the other Dave from the first round) played on this bank. Ten weeks later they more than doubled the original stake. Profits per hour played at the tables were $162.50, statistically equivalent to the projected rate of $170/hour detailed in the investor offering prospectus. Per the terms of the investment offering, players and investors split the profits with players paid in proportion to their playing hours and computer simulated win rates. Over the ten-week period of this first bank, players, mostly undergraduates, earned an average of over $80/hour while investors achieved an annualized return in excess of 250%.

The MIT Blackjack Team continued to play throughout the 1980s, growing to as many as 35 players in 1984 with a capitalization of as much as $350,000. Having played and run successful teams since 1977, Kaplan reached a point in late 1984 where he could not show his face in any casino without being followed by the casino personnel in search of his team members. As a result he decided to fall back on his growing real estate investment and development company, his "day job" since 1980, and stopped managing the team. He continued for another year or so as an occasional player and investor in the team, now being run by Massar, Chang and Bill Rubin, a player who joined the team in 1984.

The MIT Blackjack Team ran at least 22 partnerships in the time period from late 1979 through 1989. At least 70 people played on the team in some capacity (either as counters, big players, or in various supporting roles) over that time span. Every partnership was profitable during this time period, after paying all expenses as well as the players' and managers' share of the winnings, with returns to investors ranging from 4%/year to over 300%/year.

== Strategic Investments (1992–1993) ==
In 1992, Bill Kaplan, J.P. Massar, and John Chang decided to capitalize on the opening of Foxwoods Casino in nearby Connecticut, where they planned to train new players. Acting as the General Partner, they formed a Massachusetts Limited Partnership in June 1992 called Strategic Investments to bankroll the new team. Structured similar to the numerous real estate development limited partnerships that Kaplan had formed, the limited partnership raised a million dollars, significantly more money than any of their previous teams, with a method based on Edward Thorp's high low system. It involved three players: a big player, a controller, and a spotter. The spotter checked when the deck went positive with card counting, the controller would bet small constantly, wasting money, and verifying the spotter's count. Once the controller found a positive, he would signal to the big player. He would make a massive bet, and win big. Confident with this new funding, the three general partners ramped up their recruitment and training efforts to capitalize on the opportunity.

Over the next two years, the MIT Team grew to nearly 80 players, including groups and players in Cambridge, New York, New Jersey, Pennsylvania, California, Illinois, and Washington. Sarah McCord, who joined the team in 1983 as an MIT student and later moved to California, was added as a partner soon after SI was formed and became responsible for training and recruitment of West Coast players.

At various times, there were nearly 30 players playing simultaneously at different casinos around the world, including Native American casinos throughout the country, Las Vegas, Atlantic City, Canada, and island locations. Never before had casinos throughout the world seen such an organized and scientific onslaught directed at the game. While the profits rolled in, so did the "heat" from the casinos, and many MIT Team members were identified and barred. These members were replaced by fresh players from MIT, Harvard, and other colleges and companies, and play continued. Eventually, investigators hired by casinos realized that many of those they had banned had addresses in or near Cambridge, and the connection to MIT and a formalized team became clear. The detectives obtained copies of recent MIT yearbooks and added photographs from it to their image database.

With its leading players banned from most casinos and other more lucrative investment opportunities opening up at the end of the recession, Strategic Investments paid out its substantial earnings to players and investors and dissolved its partnership on December 31, 1993.

By the team's peak in the 1990s, the team was visiting Las Vegas almost every weekend. According to a casino security investigator, the team took over $400,000 in one weekend. After the trips to Vegas, the team would enter what they remembered into computer programs to devise the best strategy for specific situations.

== Split and dissolution (1994–2000) ==
After the dissolution of Strategic Investments, a few players took their winnings and formed two independent groups. The Amphibians were primarily led by Semyon Dukach, with Dukach as the big player, Katie Lilienkamp (a controller), and Andy Bloch (a spotter). The other team was the Reptiles, led by Mike Aponte, Manlio Lopez and Wes Atamian. These teams had various legal structures, and at times million-dollar banks and 50+ players. By 2000 the 15+ year reign of the MIT Blackjack Teams came to an end as players drifted into other pursuits.

In 1999, an Amphibian won at Max Rubin's 3rd Annual Blackjack Ball competition. The event was featured in an October 1999 Cigar Aficionado article, which said the winner earned the unofficial title "Most Feared Man in the Casino Business".

== Strategy and techniques ==
The team often recruited students through flyers and the players' friends from college campuses across the country. The team tested potential members to find out if they were suitable candidates and, if they were, the team thoroughly trained the new members for free. Fully trained players had to pass an intense "trial by fire," consisting of playing through 8 six-deck shoes with almost perfect play, and then undergo further training, supervision, and similar check-outs in actual casino play until they could become full stakes players.

New members of the team would train for weeks or months, starting on MIT's campus, then practicing in backroom card games in Boston's Chinatown. They would then begin as the team's mule in Vegas, carrying cash, as they worked up the team's hierarchy.

The group combined individual play with a team approach of counters and big players to maximize opportunities and disguise the betting patterns that card counting produces. In a 2002 interview in Blackjack Forum magazine, John Chang, an MIT undergrad who joined the team in late 1980 (and became MIT team co-manager in the mid-1980s and 1990s), reported that, in addition to classic card counting and blackjack team techniques, at various times the group used advanced shuffle and ace tracking techniques. While the MIT team's card counting techniques can give players an overall edge of about 2 percent, some of the MIT team's methods have been established as gaining players an overall edge of about 4 percent. In his interview, Chang reported that the MIT team had difficulty attaining such edges in actual play, and their overall results had been best with straight card counting.

The MIT Team's approach was originally developed by Al Francesco, elected by professional gamblers as one of the original seven inductees into the Blackjack Hall of Fame. Blackjack team play was first written about by Ken Uston, an early member of Al Francesco's teams along with Bill Erb and Blair Hull. Uston wrote The Big Player (1977) and Million Dollar Blackjack (1981) about Blackjack team card counting techniques. Kaplan enhanced Francesco's team methods and used them for the MIT team. The team concept enabled players and investors to leverage both their time and money, reducing their "risk of ruin" while also making it more difficult for casinos to detect card counting at their tables.

== In the media ==
=== Books ===
- A variety of stories about members of the MIT Blackjack Team formed the basis of The New York Times best-selling Bringing Down the House, written by Ben Mezrich. While originally marketed as nonfiction, Mezrich later admitted characters and stories in the book were mostly fictitious and composites of players and stories he knew through hearsay. The private investigation firm referred to as Plymouth in Bringing Down the House was Griffin Investigations.
- Mezrich wrote a follow-up book, Busting Vegas, which took even greater liberties with reality. Many events in this book were at least partly based on incidents that occurred during the team's Strategic Investments era.
- Jeff Ma wrote a book titled The House Advantage: Playing the Odds to Win Big in Business about his time on the 1994 MIT blackjack team.
- Nathaniel Tilton, a student of former team captains Mike Aponte and Semyon Dukach, authored The Blackjack Life detailing his experiences playing and being trained by the MIT Blackjack Team players.

=== Film ===
- The 2004 film The Last Casino is loosely based on this premise and features three students and a professor counting cards in Ontario and Quebec.
- The 2008 film 21, inspired by Bringing Down the House and produced by and starring Kevin Spacey and Jim Sturgess, was released on March 28, 2008, by Columbia Pictures. Jeff Ma and Henry Houh, former team players, appear in the movie as casino dealers, and Bill Kaplan appears in a cameo in the background of the underground Chinese gambling parlor scene. The script took significant artistic license with events, with most of its plot being invented for the movie; therefore, it refers to being 'inspired by true events' rather than 'based on true events.' One of the most significant departures from reality was the portrayal of the team being run by a professor (Kevin Spacey's character Micky Rosa), when in reality the team was always run by students and alumni. The characters in the movie were also fictionalized amalgams of various players throughout the years of the team's existence - for example, the character Choi is very loosely based on Johnny Chang, and the character Ben Campbell is an amalgam of numerous players, with the opening scene based on Big Dave's interview, and subsequent admission to Harvard Medical School, where much of the interview revolved around his participation on the team.
- The 2010 film Teen Patti is an uncredited remake of 21.

=== Television ===
- The Mysteries at the Museum series on the Travel Channel featured the story of the MIT Blackjack Team in the "Siamese Twins, Assassin Umbrella, Capone's Cell" episode.
- The team's Strategic Investments era appeared in The History Channel documentary Breaking Vegas, directed by Bruce David Klein.
- The Bringing Down The House period was featured on episodes of the Game Show Network documentary series, Anything to Win, and HBO's Real Sports with Bryant Gumbel (episode 116).
- The BBC documentary, Making Millions the Easy Way, addressed the Bringing Down the House period as part of the renowned "Horizon" strand (directed by Johanna Gibbon), told the story of a Strategic Investments breakaway group, and revealed the science behind the winning formula.
- "Double Down", an episode of Numb3rs concerned a counting group, led by a high school teacher, which launders money through casino winnings.

=== Other ===
- The StarTalk podcast has an episode dedicated to this topic
- Several members of the two teams have used their expertise to start public speaking careers as well as businesses teaching others how to count cards. For example, Semyon Dukach of the Amphibians founded Blackjack Science, and Mike Aponte of the Reptiles co-founded a company with former MIT Blackjack Team member David Irvine called the Blackjack Institute.
