= Shoe (cards) =

Casino gaming device for playing cards

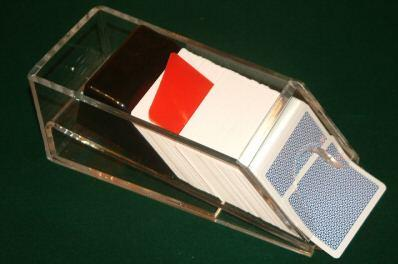
A shoe holding four decks of cards with card cut (red)

A dealing shoe or dealer's shoe is a gaming device, mainly used in casinos, to hold multiple decks of playing cards. The shoe allows for more games to be played by reducing the time between shuffles, while also reducing the chance of dealer cheating. In some games, such as blackjack (where card counting is a possibility), using multiple decks of cards can increase the house edge.

== History ==
The dealing shoe was invented in 1822, Virginia gambler Robert Bailey, for the game of faro. His shoe hid the cards from sight, but did prevent sleight-of-hand cheating on the part of the dealer. An improved version was introduced in 1825, which had an open-top, that held the deck face up so the next card to be dealt could be seen. This was rapidly adopted for faro and later for baccarat. Almost immediately versions of the shoe came on the market that allowed the dealer to cheat.

Prior to 1961 in Las Vegas casinos, all blackjack was dealt from a single deck. John Scarne proposed to the Nevada Gaming Control Board that a state ruling be enacted such that Blackjack must be dealt from a shoe (Graves's invention). While no such ruling was ever passed, most Nevada casinos now deal from a multi-deck shoe. As gaming advisor to the Havana Hilton, Scarne also introduced the shoe to Puerto Rico and Cuba.

== Usage ==
Dealing shoes are produced in different capacities according to the number of decks they can hold. Commercial manual shoes are commonly offered in capacities such as one to two decks, four to six decks, or eight decks.

When the cards are placed in the shoe, the dealer will insert a brightly colored blank plastic card, after using the same card to perform a cut. When this card is drawn it indicates that the current game is the last one before a new shuffle. This helps mitigate player advantage via card counting, as a significant portion (usually about 25 percent) of the full inventory of cards never comes into play. The percentage of cards that are dealt is sometimes called the penetration.

== Design and construction ==
A dealing shoe generally consists of a base plate that supports the stack of cards and a face plate at the front of the shoe, against which the next card to be dealt rests. The face plate typically contains an opening through which the dealer draws cards one at a time.

In regulated casino environments, manual dealing shoes may be required to include physical features intended to maintain the integrity of the game. These may include a white front portion of the base plate, transparent or inspectable sides below the base plate, and a stop below the face plate to prevent the next card from being lifted too far before it is dealt.

== Use in baccarat ==
In baccarat, cards may be dealt from a manual dealing shoe specifically designed for that purpose. Under Massachusetts baccarat rules, after the cards have been shuffled and placed in the dealing shoe, the dealer calling the game offers the shoe to players in turn; the player who accepts the shoe is designated as the curator.

== Bibliography ==
- Scarne, John (August 7, 1986). Scarne's New Complete Guide to Gambling (Rev Upd ed.). Fireside. ISBN 978-0-671-63063-8.
