= Fantasy sports stock simulation =

A fantasy sports stock simulation is a type of fantasy sports game. It differs from standard fantasy sports games, which involve drafting teams and competing against other teams in a league in certain statistical categories. In a fantasy sports stock simulation, players and teams are "stocks" in a stock market which can be bought and sold, and which acquire earnings based on their statistics. While standard fantasy sports games typically require drafting a team at the beginning of a season to participate, fantasy players can join and participate in a fantasy sports stock market at any time during the season.

Fantasy stock simulations are similar to prediction games and prediction markets in that players speculate on the future of stock prices in a virtual world.

The format was largely developed by Wall Street Sports in the 1990s, with the game growing to 75,000 members by 1998. Wall Street Sports was later sold to Sandbox.com, which grew to an audience of 3.5 million players. However, Sandbox.com went bankrupt in 2002 and the game ceased operations and the domain name was sold to Tradesports.com, Inc., a new fantasy sports site.
