= The Last Casino =

2004 drama film

- Written by: Steven Westren
- Directed by: Pierre Gill
- Starring: Charles Martin Smith; Katharine Isabelle; Kris Lemche; Julian Richings; Albert Chung
- Music by: Martin Roy
- Country of origin: Canada
- Original languages: English; French; Cantonese

Production
- Producers: Greg Dummett; Lorraine Richard; Madeleine Henri
- Cinematography: Bernard Couture
- Editor: Sylvain Lebel
- Running time: 92 minutes
- Production company: Astral Films

Original release
- Network: The Movie Network
- Release: 26 June 2004

The Last Casino (also known by its French title, La Mise Finale) is a 2004 English-French-Cantonese-language Canadian drama film about a card counting scheme. The film was produced by Greg Dummett, Lorraine Richard and Madeleine Henri, directed by Pierre Gill and written by Steven Westren. The Last Casino stars Charles Martin Smith as Barnes, Katharine Isabelle as Elyse, Kris Lemche as Scott, Julian Richings as Orr and Albert Chung as George.

The Last Casino draws heavily from the story of the MIT Blackjack Team. The MIT Blackjack Team was a group of students from Massachusetts Institute of Technology who were trained by Bill Kaplan. Kaplan delayed his entrance to Harvard University because he believed he could create a mathematics model that would assist him in being successful at blackjack. In 1977, Kaplan turned $1000 into $35000 within a nine-month period.

== Summary ==
Mathematics professor Doug Barnes plays the game of blackjack at casinos using a tactic known as card counting. Wilson, a casino security manager, captures Barnes' face and effectively blacklists him from the casino. Barnes' usurer, Orr, meets with Barnes to discuss how he will get his money back after Barnes is banned from the casino. Barnes suggests the idea of creating a team of card counters from the students at the university where Barnes teaches. Orr snips off one of Barnes' fingertips, explaining that this will assist Barnes in remembering him, and tells him that he will consider his proposal.

After searching around the university, Barnes recruits three students: George, who has memorized pi 70 units past the decimal; Scott, who aces a complex memorization test; and Elyse, a waitress who successfully memorizes a complicated order Barnes makes for a pizza in a short period of time. After convincing them that his plan has little risk, Barnes proceeds to teach the students to count cards. Barnes brings the students to Orr, and tells them that he is their investor. Orr agrees to give money and tells Barnes that they are partners and he will get 75% of Barnes' 50% share.

Prior to the group going to their first casino, Barnes gives them different identities. At the first casino, George becomes overwhelmed by the game and Elyse jumps in to help. After their first night, they make $6,000. One night at the casino, Elyse is approached by a man who claims he chases gamblers. Elyse asks him if he noticed any pros at the casino that night and he points out Scott, saying that it is obvious that he is a card counter.

After an off night at the casino, Orr tells Barnes that the deal is off because the students are struggling and Barnes' compulsive gambling is becoming a problem. He gives Barnes one week to pay back his $100,000 debt. Barnes meets with the students and tells them that they have one week to earn $500,000. Barnes tells them that Orr is not a man they want to mess with and the students devise a plan to play at all the casinos in the Ottawa and Quebec area.

The casino discovers the team and attempts to get them all in a room to talk. The casino first questions Scott and George. The students then move onto the Ottawa region, hoping that local casinos have not been alerted to their activities. After their night in Ottawa, Elyse discovers that Scott lost $20,000. George goes back to the casino in attempt to make the team money. After hours at the casino, George apprehended by the casino management where he gets in a fight because he did not want to give up the money he made.

The team buys their way into a secret game, where they discover that their card counting will not work. After a big win, Elyse suggest they take a break. Elyse tells the secret casino manager that the deck is short four cards and asks for them to be counted. The team packs up and decides to bring the money they have to Barnes. When they hand over the money to Barnes, they arranged for Orr to meet as well, to ensure that Barnes does not steal the money. The movie concludes with them finding out that Barnes lied about the amount owed. George gives Elyse money to help her with school and they part ways.

== Cast ==
- Charles Martin Smith as Doug Barnes
- Katharine Isabelle as Elyse
- Kris Lemche as Scott
- Julian Richings as Orr
- Albert Chung as George
- Normand D'Amour as Wilson
- Jacques Godin as Saunders

== Reception ==
=== Critical response ===
According to critic aggregation review site Rotten Tomatoes, the film has a critic rating of 63% based on 250+ reviews.

== See also ==
- 2004 in films
- List of films shot in Ontario
- List of films about mathematicians
- 21, a 2008 film also based on the MIT Blackjack Team
