= Sam Golzari =

British actor of Iranian descent (born 1979)

- Born: 12 July 1979 (age 47)
- Occupations: actor, musician
- Years active: 1983-present
- Partner: Denise Penagos

←

Sam Golzari (Persian: سام گلزاری; born 12 July 1979) is a British actor and musician of Iranian descent active in the United States. He is known for his debut role in American Dreamz.

Golzari was born in Hammersmith, London, England, to parents of Persian origin. He was three years old when his parents left Iran during the Iran-Iraq War.

He received his BA from UCLA in 2003, where he worked in the Conservatory Acting Program. Golzari's plans were to stay in the theater, but while at college he started working on student films. The short film The Break screened at the Method Fest Independent Film Festival in 2005 and won the Adelphia Award for best student short film. His TV debut was on the Showtime network when it aired The Invisible Man, directed by UCLA film student Angela Mrema.

Golzari landed the first Hollywood film for which he auditioned, American Dreamz, playing Omer: a terrorist and lover of musical theatre. For the film 21, he was initially asked to perform a generic "Middle Eastern" accent. However, Golzari decided to use his own voice, which the director supported.

Golzari is a founding member of the LA-based band the Elevaters, who released a self-titled EP in 2006, and the full-length album Rising in 2007.

Golzari is listed as a Theater Leadership Fellow of the Latino Theater Company.

In March 2026, Golzari spoke on the 2026 Iran war, saying, “I want this regime gone. But there is no reality in that I trust Trump or Israel to have my country, my people’s best interest in mind. I’ve never felt this position. There is no equilibrium."

== Selected filmography ==
=== Film ===
Year	Title	Role	Notes
2004	The Break	Zack	Short
2006	American Dreamz	Omer	
2008	21	Cam	
2008	AmericanEast	David	
2008	The Gold & the Beautiful	Josh Benedict	
2012	Letting Go	Tim	
2014	Shirin in Love	Ben	
2016	Jimmy Vestvood: Amerikan Hero	Homayoun	
2018	A Simple Wedding	Ali	

=== Television ===
Year	Title	Role	Notes
2004	The Invisible Man	Stan Harvey	TV short
2007	In Case of Emergency	Waiter (uncredited)	Episode: "Happy Endings"
2009	Bones	Chriss Ballinger	Episode: "The Gamer in the Grease"
2011	NCIS: Los Angeles	Clerk	Episode: "Deadline"
2014	Extant	Danny	What on Earth is Wrong?
2014	Matador	Haik Katoyan	Episode: "Misanthropology"
