= Hole carding =

Card games technique

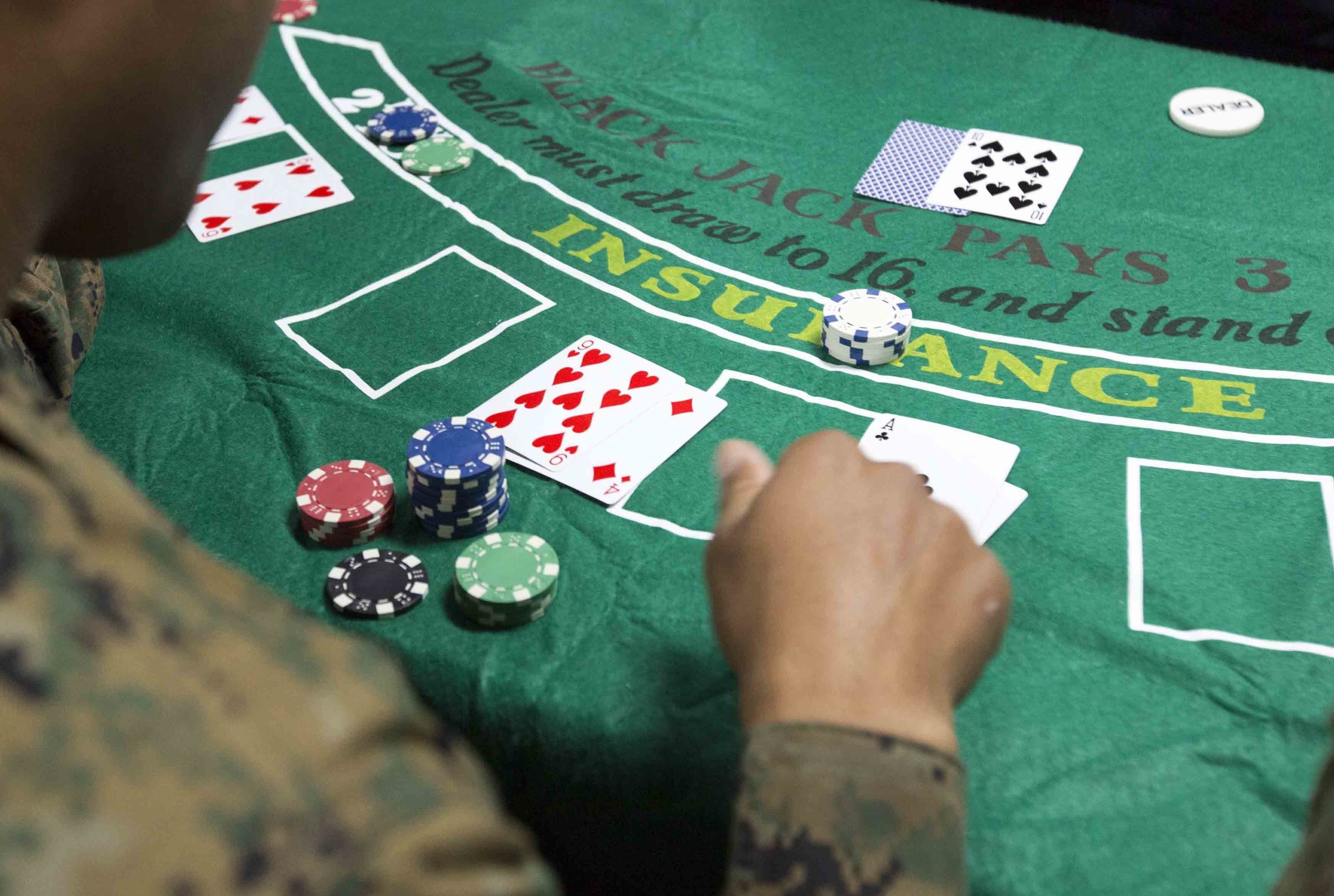
A game of blackjack where the dealer has a single face-down hole card

In card games, hole carding is the obtaining of knowledge of cards that are supposed to be hidden from view. The term is usually applied to blackjack but can apply to other games with hidden hole cards, like three card poker and Caribbean stud poker. So long as it does not involve the use of a device like a mirror, actions like touching the dealer's cards, or having another person read and signal the hole card, in most jurisdictions hole carding is a legal form of advantage gambling. In some games, like stud poker, casinos normally have rules against rubbernecking or having a confidant stand behind an opponent to signal hole cards.

Blackjack players must usually make playing decisions based on only seeing one of the dealer's cards (the upcard). But if the dealer's hole card is spotted, a player who plays correctly has a theoretical advantage of up to 13% instead of the normal player disadvantage of around 0.5%. A hole-card player will often choose not to make certain plays, such as hitting (or surrendering) a hard 19 against a dealer 20, so as not to reveal that he can see the dealer's hole card.

This technique is not applicable in most games outside of the United States where the second dealer card is normally not dealt until all players have played.

== Strategies ==
A normal blackjack strategy has ten columns, for an ace through dealer ten value card. Strategy tables for hole carding differ from normal blackjack tables as they include a column for each possible total dealer hand instead of simply the visible card. Below is a sample hole card hit/stand table for six decks, stand on soft-17. The columns are based on the dealer hand and the rows based on the player hand. Green denotes a hit.

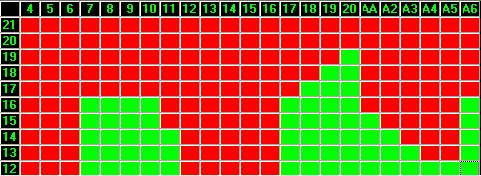

== First-basing and spooking ==
One method of hole carding is to peek at the card when the dealer checks the hole card for blackjack. This is called "first-basing". A modification called "spooking" refers to a partner with a better view peeking at the hole card in the same circumstance and communicating the information to the player. Peeking devices have made these methods largely obsolete.

== Front-loading ==
Front-loading refers to observing the hole card as it is slid under the upcard. Newer methods of hole-carding concentrate on observation before the down card is placed under the upcard. This provides information about the card even if the dealer upcard is not a ten or an ace. The advantage varies depending on the rules, the percentage of cards seen, and the strategies used.

== Partial information ==
At times the player will see a corner of the hole card, but not enough to determine the exact card. For example, if there is no pip in the corner, the card may be an ace, 2 or 3. Or, if there is a pip in the corner, it is a 4-10, but not a face card. To make use of this additional information, a different set of strategy tables must be used depending on the set of possible cards in the hole.

Below is a sample blackjack, partial hole card hit/stand table for two decks. The columns are based on the dealer upcard and the rows based on the player hand. Partial hole card tables contain ten columns as the dealer's total hand is not known with complete certainty. A different set of tables must be used depending on the information acquired from the hole card. In this table, the hole card is a six or seven. Green denotes a hit. One might note that this table bears little resemblance to standard blackjack strategy.

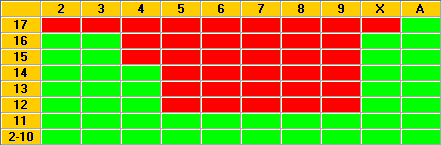

== Next card play ==
Hole carding generally refers to knowing the dealer’s hole card. Next card play refers to knowing the next card to be dealt. If a round has not started, and a player knows what his or her first card will be, one can simply alter one's bet depending on the value of that card. In a game like blackjack, if the dealer has already dealt a player's first two cards, and the player knows the next card to be dealt, it becomes possible for playing decisions to be altered to include this additional information. Strategies are significantly more complex as there exists a different strategy table for each possible next card. Strategies may also differ depending on a player's position in the dealing rotation:

- First Seat – If the player does not take the known card, another player gets it.
- Last Seat – If the player does not take the card, the dealer may draw it. This also applies in a situation where no player to one's left is likely to draw a card.
- No hole card – In a no-hole-card game, if the player does not take the card, it may become the dealer’s second card.

== Other methods ==
- Warped cards – In a casino where a blackjack dealer bends the hole card to check for a blackjack, the cards can become warped. The warps can be later used to determine the value of a face down card. This method is largely obsolete as most casinos use devices instead of bending cards to determine dealer blackjacks, and cards are regularly replaced with new decks.
- Dealer tells – When a blackjack dealer checks for a blackjack, some dealers may give clues as to the value of the down card, akin to poker tells. Again, most casinos now use devices to check the down card, rendering this obsolete in most casinos.
- Peeking at other players' cards – Depending on the game and casino, this may or may not be acceptable and may aid player decisions.
- Counting by inference – In blackjack where player cards are dealt face down, the actions of other players can provide clues as to their hidden cards. This is less valuable in modern casinos due to the fewer number of single-deck games and reduction in penetration (how deeply the dealer deals before shuffling.)
