= 21 (2008 film) =

2008 film by Robert Luketic

- Theatrical release poster
- Directed by: Robert Luketic
- Written by: Peter Steinfeld; Allan Loeb
- Based on: Bringing Down the House by Ben Mezrich
- Produced by: Kevin Spacey; Dana Brunetti; Michael De Luca
- Starring: Jim Sturgess; Kate Bosworth; Laurence Fishburne; Kevin Spacey
- Cinematography: Russell Carpenter
- Edited by: Elliot Graham
- Music by: David Sardy
- Production companies: Columbia Pictures; Relativity Media; Trigger Street Productions; Michael De Luca Productions
- Distributed by: Sony Pictures Releasing
- Release date: March 28, 2008
- Running time: 122 minutes
- Country: United States
- Language: English
- Budget: $35 million
- Box office: $159.8 million

21 is a 2008 American heist drama film directed by Robert Luketic and distributed by Sony Pictures Releasing. The film is inspired by the story of the MIT Blackjack Team as told in Bringing Down the House, the best-selling 2003 book by Ben Mezrich. The film stars Jim Sturgess, Kevin Spacey, Laurence Fishburne, Kate Bosworth, Liza Lapira, Jacob Pitts, Aaron Yoo, and Kieu Chinh. Although reviews from critics were mixed, it was a box office success and was the number one film in the United States and Canada during its first and second weekends of release.

== Plot ==
Ben Campbell, a mathematics major at the Massachusetts Institute of Technology, is accepted into Harvard Medical School, but cannot afford the $300,000 tuition. He applies for the prestigious Robinson Scholarship, which would cover the entire cost. Despite having a Medical College Admission Test score of 44 (at the time, MCAT scoring was on a scale of 3 to 45) and high grades, he faces fierce competition, and is told by the director that the scholarship will only go to whichever student dazzles him.

Back at MIT, Professor Micky Rosa challenges Ben with the Monty Hall problem, which he solves. After looking at Ben's 97% score on his latest non-linear equations test, Micky invites Ben to join the MIT Blackjack Team, consisting of fellow students Choi, Fisher, Jill and Kianna. Using card counting and covert signalling, they increase their probability of winning at casinos, leading them to earn substantial profits.

Over many weekends, the team is flown to Las Vegas and Ben comes to enjoy his luxurious life as a high roller. The team is impressed by Ben's skill, but Fisher becomes jealous and fights him while drunk, leading Micky to expel him. Cole Williams, the head of security at Planet Hollywood, has been monitoring the team and begins to focus on Ben.

Ben's devotion to blackjack causes him to neglect his role in an engineering competition, which estranges him from his friends. During the next trip to Vegas, he is emotionally distracted and fails to walk away from the table when signaled, causing him to lose $200,000. An irate Micky demands Ben repay the $200,000 and departs for Boston, leaving the team behind. Ben and three of the students decide that they will continue to play blackjack without Micky, but they are caught by Williams, whom Micky tipped off. Williams beats up Ben and warns him not to return. He also reveals his own personal history with Micky, once a successful card counter who got Williams fired after winning over a million dollars in one night at his casino while he was away at his father's funeral.

Ben learns he is ineligible for graduation because a course taught by an associate of Micky's is marked as incomplete (with Micky's influence, the professor initially gives Ben a passing grade throughout the year without him having to work or even show up to class). His winnings are stolen from his dorm room. Suspecting Micky, Ben confers with his teammates and they persuade Micky to make a final trip to Vegas before the casinos install biometric software. The team puts on disguises and returns to Planet Hollywood, winning $640,000 before Williams spots them.

Micky flees with the bag of chips but realizes he has been set up when he discovers that the bag is full of chocolate coins. It is revealed that Ben and Williams made a deal to lure Micky to Vegas so that Williams could capture him. Williams' men take Micky, and Cole explains he is going to get in contact with a friend of his with the IRS about Micky's untaxed winnings. In exchange, Williams commits to allowing Ben to keep his winnings from that day, but later double-crosses him as he is leaving, taking the bag of chips at gunpoint. When Ben protests, Williams explains he needs retirement funds, whereas intelligent people like Ben will always find a way to succeed.

Ben's long-time friends (with whom he has reconciled) Miles and Cam also turn out to be quite good at card-counting, working with Choi and Kianna during Micky's capture and as such, the six-person team make a lot of money, despite Williams' robbery of Ben and Micky's chips. The film ends with Ben recounting the tale to the dazzled and dumbfounded scholarship director.

== Cast ==
- Jim Sturgess as Ben Campbell
- Kate Bosworth as Jill Taylor
- Kevin Spacey as Micky Rosa
- Laurence Fishburne as Cole Williams
- Aaron Yoo as Choi
- Liza Lapira as Kianna
- Jacob Pitts as Fisher
- Josh Gad as Miles
- Sam Golzari as Cam
- Jack McGee as Terry
- Helen Carey as Ellen Campbell
- Jack Gilpin as Bob Phillips

== Production ==
The film had originally been set up at Metro-Goldwyn-Mayer with the title of Breaking Vegas and Brett Ratner attached as director. They were unable to use the original title of the book due to the 2003 comedy film of the same name. Other titles considered included Beat the House, The System and Beginner's Luck. After Sony Pictures acquired the film, it was renamed to 21, and Shawn Levy was offered to direct.

The filming of 21 began in March 2007. Principal filming of the Las Vegas scenes took place at the Planet Hollywood Resort & Casino, the Red Rock Casino, and the Hard Rock Casino in Las Vegas. Filming also took place at Harvard Medical School, Chinatown, in Cambridge, and the Christian Science Center in Boston, Massachusetts. As Massachusetts Institute of Technology did not allow filming on campus, the MIT school and dorm interiors, the gymnasium and the alumni reception were all shot at Boston University.

== Reception ==
=== Critical response ===
On review aggregator Rotten Tomatoes 36% of 168 critics gave the film a positive review, for an average rating of 5.30/10. The site's critical consensus reads: "21 could have been a fascinating study had it not supplanted the true story on which it is based with mundane melodrama." Metacritic gave the film an average score of 48 out of 100, based on 29 critics, indicating "mixed or average" reviews. Audiences polled by CinemaScore gave the film an average grade of "B+" on an A+ to F scale.

Joe Leydon of Variety magazine was positive about the cast and called it "a slickly polished package that should appeal to anyone who's ever dreamed of beating the odds" but suggested that a more well known cast might have resulted in greater box office earnings. Desson Thomson of The Washington Post wrote: "The story may be based on real events, but most of it feels patently false."

=== Box office ===
In its opening weekend, the film grossed $24,105,943 in 2,648 theaters in the United States and Canada, averaging $9,103 per venue and ranking first at the box office. Sony reported that 53% of the audience was male and 53% was under 25 years old, indicating broad turnout among key age and gender demographics. The film was also the number one film in its second weekend of release, losing 36% of its audience, grossing $15,337,418, expanding to 2,653 theaters, and averaging $5,781 per venue. The film dropped to third place in its third weekend, losing 32% of its audience, grossing $10,470,173, expanding to 2,736 theaters, and averaging $3,827 per venue. By the fourth weekend it fell to sixth place, losing 47% of its audience, grossing $5,520,362 expanding to 2,903 theaters, and averaging $1,902 per venue.

By the end of its theatrical run, the film grossed a total of $157,802,470 worldwide—$81,159,365 in the United States and Canada and $76,643,105 in other territories, against a budget estimated at $35 million.

=== Casting controversy ===
A race-based controversy arose over the decision to make the majority of the characters White Americans, even though the main players in the book Bringing Down the House, upon which the film 21 is based, were mainly Asian Americans. However, the real-world MIT blackjack team has not been consistently majority-Asian, and only one of the characters in the book was based on a real person; the rest were composites or fabrications. Ben Kaplan, who is Jewish, stated "While Ben Mezrich has been quoted as saying that Micky Rosa was a composite of myself, J.P. Massar, and John Chang, the fact is there is little, if anything, that resembles either of us except that he started and ran the team and was focused on running the team as a business". The lead role was given to London-born Jim Sturgess, who required a dialect coach to speak with an American accent.

Jeff Ma, who was the real-life inspiration for the character Ben Campbell and served as a consultant on the film, was attacked as being a "race traitor" on several blogs for not insisting that his character be Asian-American. In response, Ma said, "I'm not sure they understand how little control I had in the movie-making process; I didn't get to cast it." Ma said that the controversy was "overblown" and that the important aspect is that a talented actor would portray him. Ma, who is Chinese American, told USA Today, "I would have been a lot more insulted if they had chosen someone who was Japanese or Korean, just to have an Asian playing me." He also says that major Ben Campbell plot elements, such as his father's death and the romance between him and Kate Bosworth's character, were fabrications and not based on anything that happened in Ma's life.

Nick Rogers of The Enterprise wrote, "The real-life students mostly were Asian-Americans, but 21 whitewashes its cast and disappointingly lumps its only Asian-American actors (Aaron Yoo and Liza Lapira) into one-note designations as the team's kleptomaniac and a slot-playing 'loser.'"

The Media Action Network for Asian Americans (MANAA) reported on their web site: "After the 'white-washing' issue was raised on Entertainment Weekly's web site, [21] producer Dana Brunetti wrote: "Believe me, I would have LOVED to cast Asians in the lead roles, but the truth is, we didn't have access to any bankable Asian-American actors that we wanted."

== Home media ==
21 was released on DVD, Blu-ray and UMD in Region 1 on July 21, 2008.

== Reaction from casinos ==
In pre-production, the producers and the book's original writers predicted that the Las Vegas casinos would be unhelpful, as a film that told viewers the basics of card counting might hurt their bottom line. A featurette included with the DVD completely and accurately describes the "Hi-Lo" system used by the MIT Blackjack Club and by Rosa's team in the film.

The writers of the film were told by the producers that MGM Studios would finance the film, though all "MGM" casinos (including one used by the real MIT Blackjack Team) are owned by MGM Resorts International and are no longer related to MGM Studios. As another DVD featurette reveals, the casinos (including MGM Resorts) saw the film as an attention-getter; people who saw it would be encouraged to go to Vegas and play. The film withheld critical strategy details (such as the conversion from the "running count" to a "true count"), and most beginning card counters underestimate the number and value of the mistakes they make.

== Soundtrack ==
21

Soundtrack album by Various Artists
- Released: March 18, 2008
- Genre: Soundtrack
- Label: Columbia

Singles from 21 - Music from the Motion Picture
- 1. "You Can't Always Get What You Want" (Soulwax Remix)" Released: February 19, 2008; 2. "Big Ideas" Released: August 11, 2008

Professional ratings
Review scores
Source	Rating
AllMusic	3/5 stars

The soundtrack was released at the same time as the film.

1. The Rolling Stones—"You Can't Always Get What You Want" (Remixed by Soulwax) (6:07)
2. MGMT—"Time to Pretend" (Super Clean Version) (4:20)
3. LCD Soundsystem—"Big Ideas" (5:41)
4. D. Sardy featuring Liela Moss—"Giant" (3:42)
5. Amon Tobin—"Always" (3:38)
6. Peter Bjorn and John—"Young Folks" (4:37)
7. Shook One —"Soul Position" (4:16)
8. Get Shakes—"Sister Self Doubt" (4:22)
9. The Aliens—"I Am The Unknown" (5:27)
10. Rihanna—"Shut Up and Drive" (3:34)
11. Knivez Out—"Alright" (3:31)
12. Domino—"Tropical Moonlight" (3:28)
13. Unkle—"Hold My Hand" (4:58)
14. Mark Ronson featuring Kasabian—"L.S.F. (Lost Souls Forever)" (3:32)
15. Broadcast—"Tender Buttons" (2:51)

Other tracks

- Although it is not included in the soundtrack, Moby's "Slippin' Away" (Axwell Vocal Remix) plays in the scene when Ben is passing through airport security.
- The song "Everybody Get Dangerous" by Weezer was also featured in the film, but not included on the soundtrack since it was not yet released. It would later be released on Weezer's 2008 record, The Red Album. It is played on a distant radio when the team is in a poker club.
- The songs "I Want You to Want Me" by Cheap Trick and "Music is Happiness" by The Octopus Project were also featured in the film but not on the soundtrack album.
- The song "Magnificent" by Estelle (feat. Kardinal Offishall) was also featured in the film but not on the soundtrack album.
- In the promotional trailers, "Break on Through (To the Other Side)" by The Doors was used.
- During the restaurant scene where the team explains to Ben how they work, "Home" by Great Northern can be heard playing in the background.
- The song "Again with the Subtitles" by Texas artist Yppah is another uncredited song in the film.
- The track played as the team makes off at the end of the film is "Rito a Los Angeles" by Giuseppe De Luca, which features part of the main riff of "In-A-Gadda-Da-Vida". This track is also used in Ocean's Twelve, the first sequel to the caper film Ocean's Eleven, about actually robbing casinos in Vegas.
- The song "My Mathematical Mind" by Spoon was featured in the film's trailers.

== See also ==
- Films in 2008
- List of films set in Las Vegas
- List of films about mathematicians
- The Last Casino
