= Veikkaus (1940–2017) =

Defunct Finnish gambling agency (1940–2017)

Coordinates: 60.26029°N 24.81097°E

Veikkaus Oy
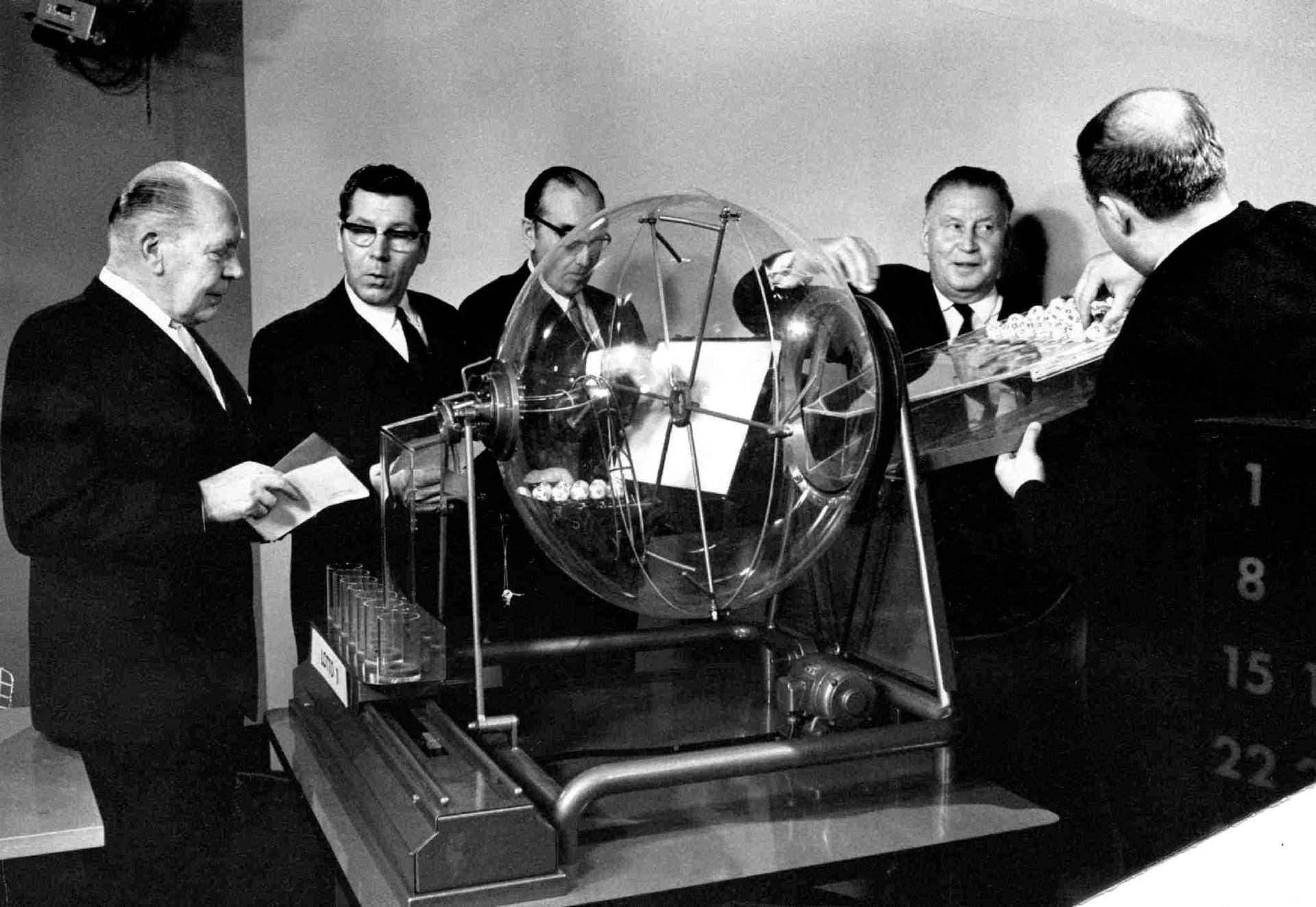
- Formerly: Oy Tippaustoimisto Ab
- Company type: Limited company
- Industry: Gaming
- Founded: 1940
- Defunct: 2017
- Fate: Merged with Fintoto and RAY
- Successor: Veikkaus (2017)
- Headquarters: Vantaa, Finland
- Owner: Finnish government
- Number of employees: 364 (2010)
- Website: www.veikkaus.fi

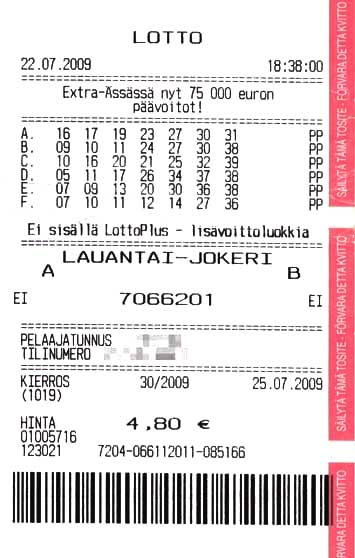
A modern Finnish Lotto coupon, with personal info (customer no. and account for winnings) blanked out. These coupons are printed out on a terminal connected to Veikkaus, the lottery provider, whenever a player participates in the lottery.

Veikkaus Oy was the Finnish national betting agency. It was fully owned by the Finnish government and had an exclusive legal betting license on lotteries and sports betting in Finland. Veikkaus was managed by the Finnish Ministry of Education, which shared money earned by Veikkaus with various organizations. In 2010 Veikkaus gave 462.7 million euros for the Ministry of Education to share. The rules of the games and gaming itself are controlled by the Finnish Ministry of Internal Affairs.

On January 1, 2017, Veikkaus merged with RAY and Fintoto. The new company that was founded as a result is also called Veikkaus.

== History ==
Veikkaus organises 20 different games, the most popular being the Finnish national lottery, which generates more than a third of the company's total sales. Other important games are Football pools and Fixed Odds Betting (forms of sports betting), and the Ässä scratch tickets.

The Finnish Ministry of Education is responsible for allocating the profits produced by Veikkaus's activities in a socially optimal way between amateur sports, the arts, science and youth work. These profits exceed a million euros daily, and constitute a significant part of government expenditure in these fields.

Veikkaus was founded in 1940 by the Football Association of Finland and the Finnish Workers' Sports Federation under the name Oy Tippaustoimisto AB. The agency first offered only sports betting, but in 1971 the Finnish national lottery was kicked off, and it proved a huge boom. Today, approximately seventy per cent of Finnish people say they take part in the Lottery at least annually.

Speden Spelit (1992–2002) was attached with the gambling of national betting agency Veikkaus. The show was closed down shortly after the death of Spede Pasanen.

In August 2009 Veikkaus's Web site was the target of a heavy DDoS attack lasting several days and the agency blocked its site and services from foreign-based users.

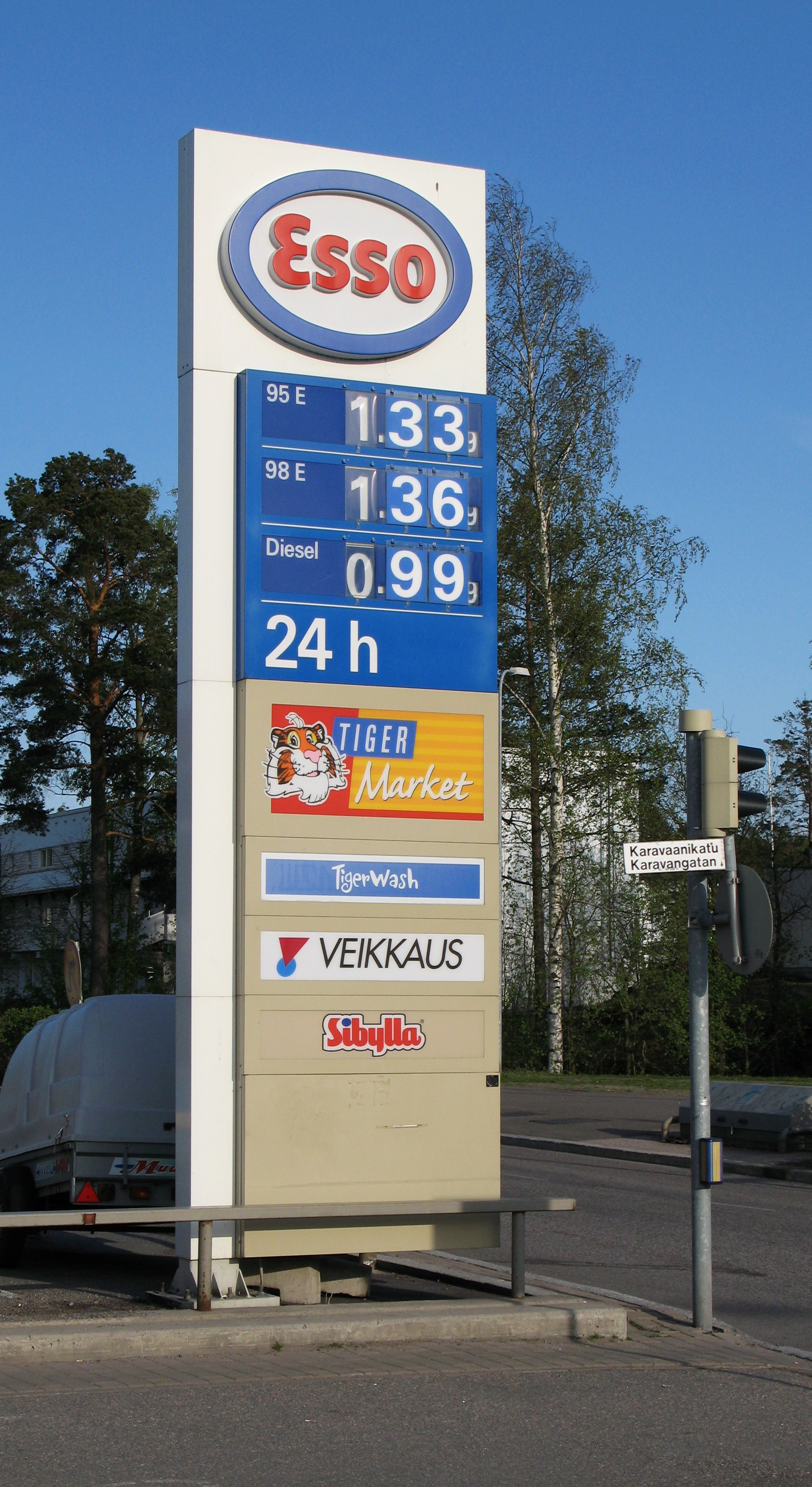
Old Veikkaus logo in Esso advertising pole

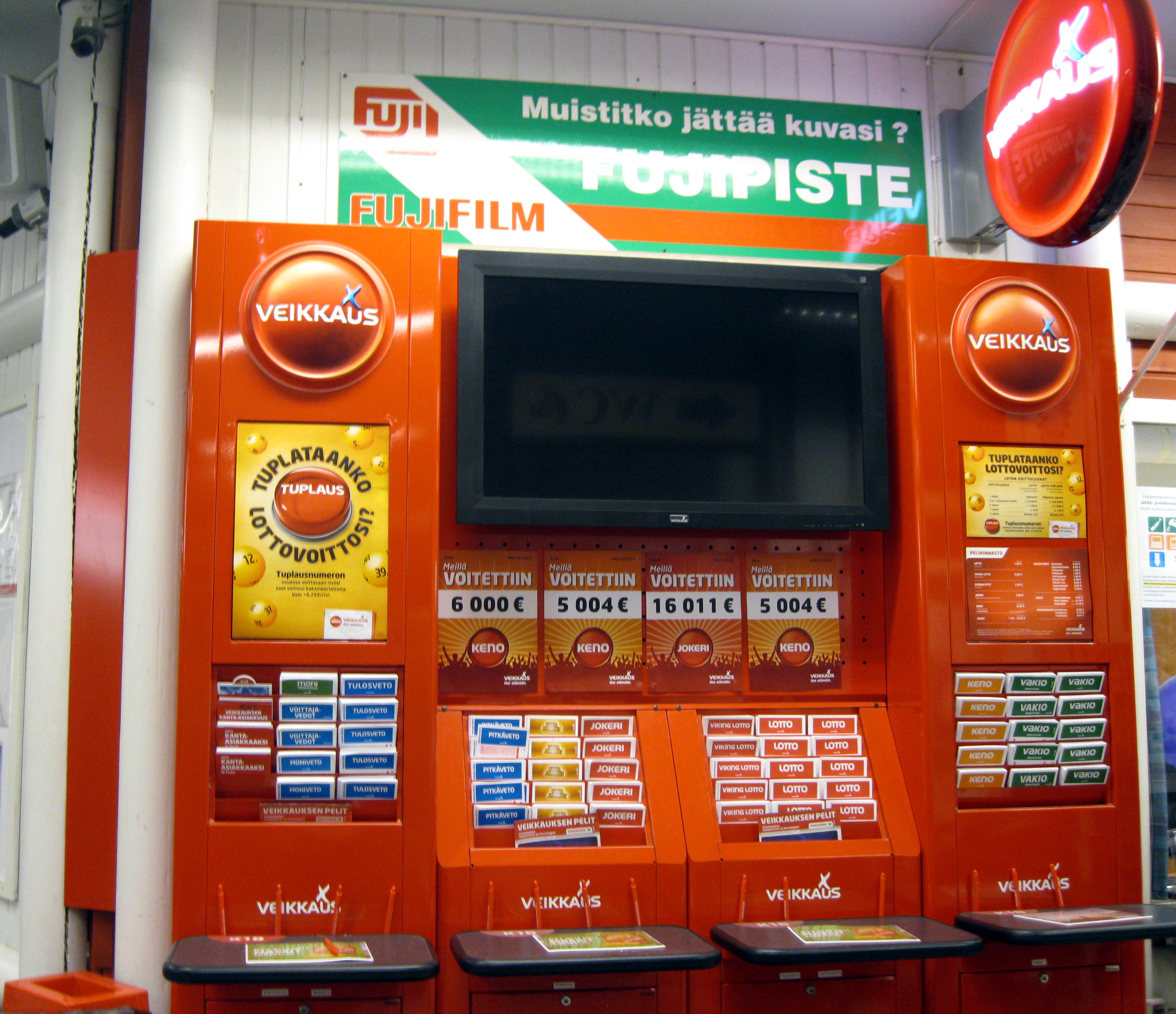
Veikkaus lottery office in 2014

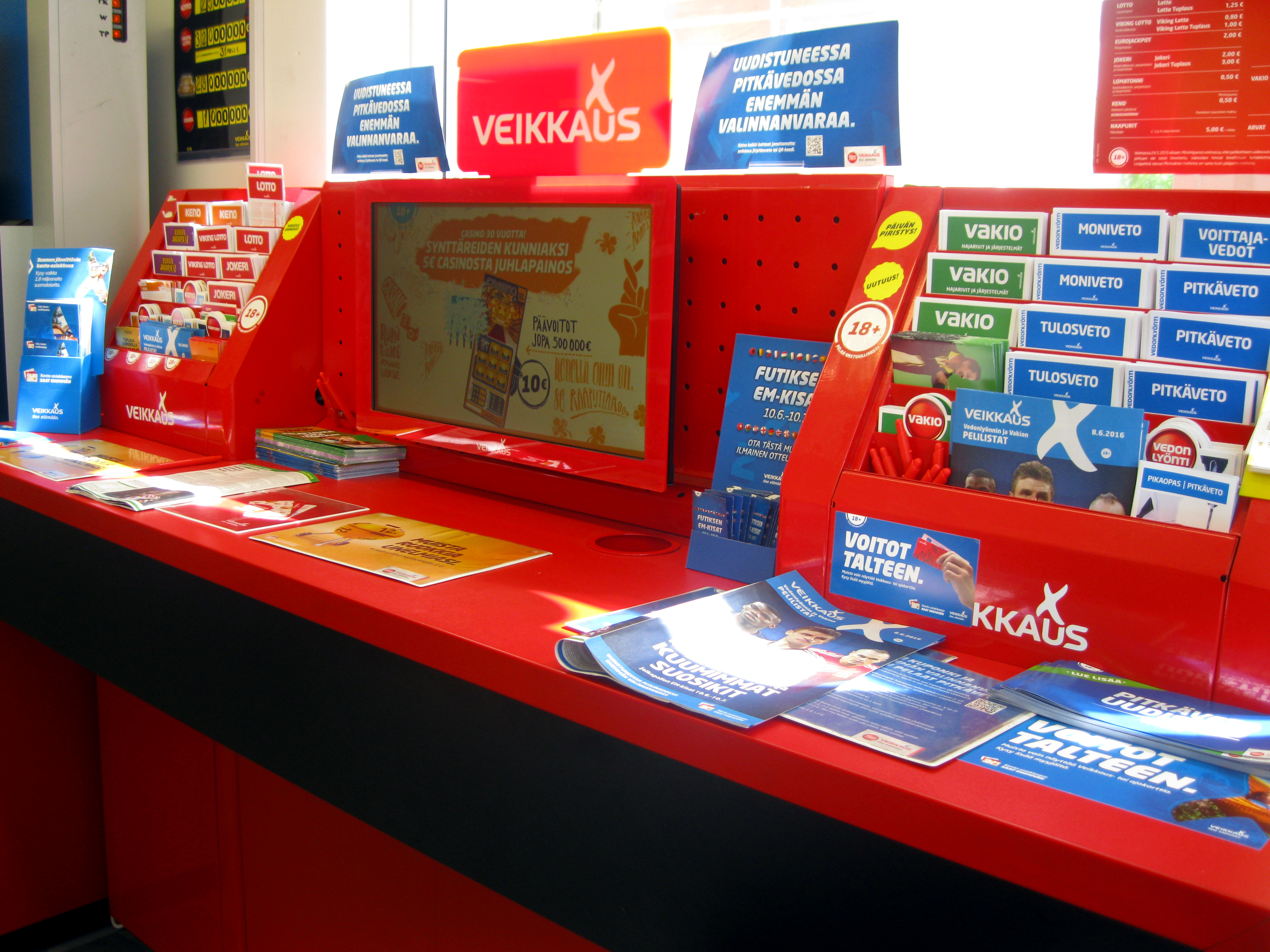
Veikkaus lottery office in 2016

== See also ==
- Finnish pesäpallo match-fixing scandal
- Veikkaus (2017–)
