= Casino =

Gambling facility

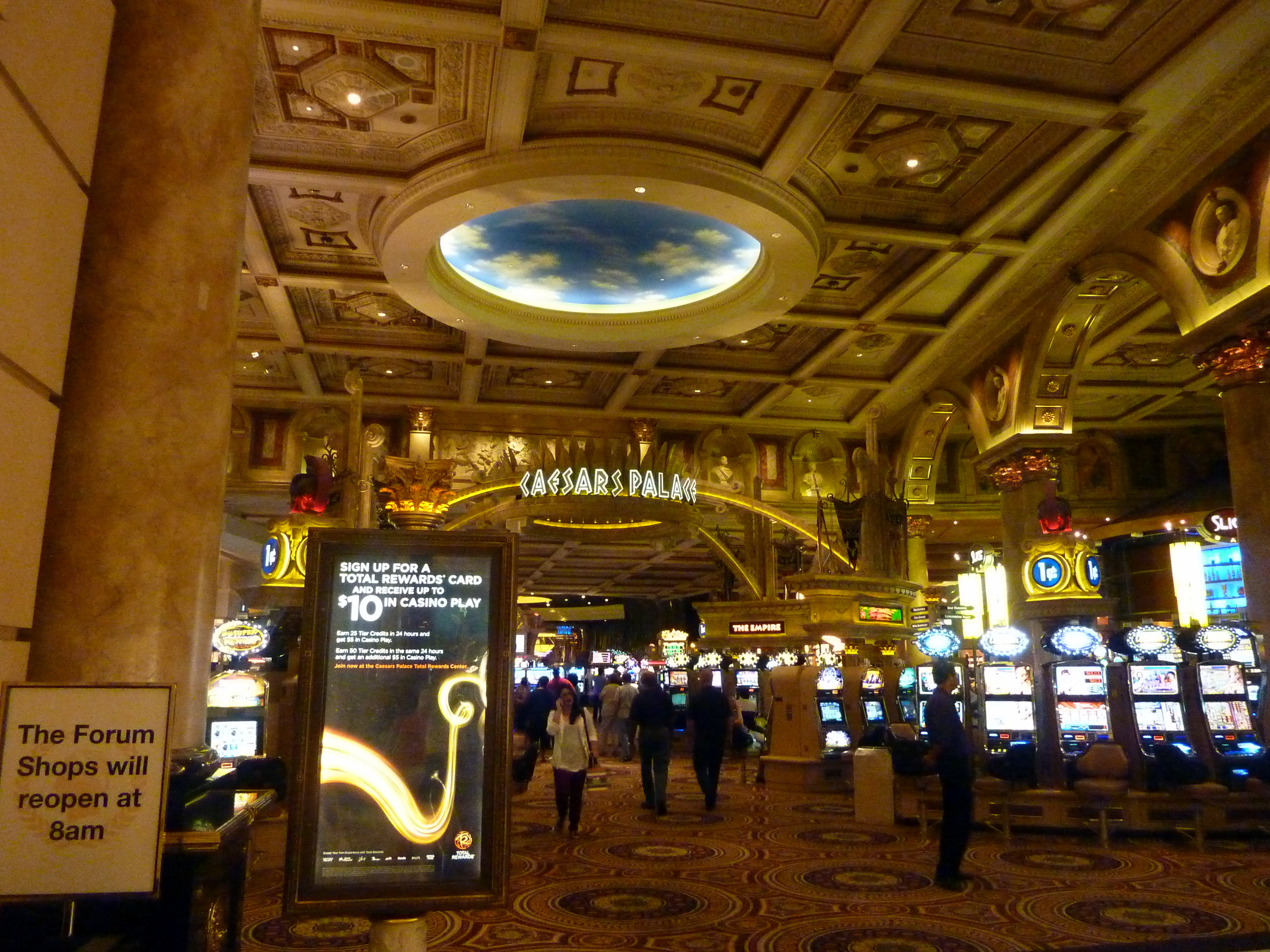
Caesars Palace, a popular casino which opened in 1966 on the Las Vegas Strip

A casino is a facility for gambling. Casinos are often built near or combined with hotels, resorts, restaurants, retail shopping, cruise ships, and other tourist attractions. Some casinos are also known for hosting live entertainment, such as stand-up comedy, concerts, and sporting events. The term casino is of Italian origin, from the root word casa meaning "house." Originally, the term referred to a small country villa, summerhouse, or social club. During the 19th century, casino came to encompass other public buildings where pleasurable activities took place.

The precise origin of gambling is unknown, but it is believed to have existed in nearly every society in history. The first known European gambling house, the Ridotto, was established in Venice, Italy, in 1638 to provide controlled gambling during the carnival season. In the United States, early gambling establishments were known as saloons. In the early 20th century, gambling was outlawed in the US by state legislation. However, in 1931, gambling was legalized in Nevada, leading to the rise of Las Vegas as a major gambling center. In 1976, New Jersey allowed gambling in Atlantic City, which is now the second-largest gambling city in the US.

Casinos offer a variety of games of chance, which in some cases involve an element of skill. Common games include craps, roulette, baccarat, blackjack, and video poker. All casino games have a mathematically determined advantage for the house, known as the house edge, which ensures that the casino will make a profit in the long run. The percentage of funds returned to players as winnings is known as the payout. Slot machines have become one of the most popular forms of gambling in casinos. The design of a casino, including factors like sound, odour, and lighting, is often carefully controlled to encourage gambling.

Globally, there are several major casino markets. Macau is the largest gambling market in the world, having surpassed Las Vegas in terms of revenue. Other significant gambling centers include Singapore, Monte Carlo, and various locations in Europe and the United States. Some of the most famous casinos in the world include the Monte Carlo Casino, The Venetian Macao, and Caesars Palace. The casino industry is a major part of the tourism and leisure industry, with the largest casino operator companies generating tens of billions of dollars in revenue annually.

== Etymology and usage ==
Casino is of Italian origin; the root casa means a house. In modern-day Italian, a casino is a brothel (also called casa chiusa, literally "closed house"), a mess (confusing situation), or a noisy environment; a gambling house is spelt casinò, with an accent. In casino (IPA /kaˈzino/), the emphasis is on the middle syllable (ca-SI-no). In casinò (IPA /kaziˈnɔ/ or /kasiˈnɔ/), the grave accent places emphasis on the final syllable (ca-si-NÒ).

The term casinó may mean a small country villa, summerhouse, or social club. During the 19th century, casino came to include other public buildings where pleasurable activities took place; such edifices were usually built on the grounds of a larger Italian villa or palazzo, and were used to host civic town functions, including dancing, gambling, music listening, and sports. Examples in Italy include Villa Farnese and Villa Giulia.

Not all casinos are used for gambling. The Catalina Casino, on Santa Catalina Island, California, has never been used for traditional games of chance, which were already outlawed in California by the time it was built. The Copenhagen Casino was a Danish theatre which also held public meetings during the 1848 Revolution, which made Denmark a constitutional monarchy.

In military and non-military usage, a casino (Spanish) or Kasino (German) is an officers' mess.

== History of gambling houses ==
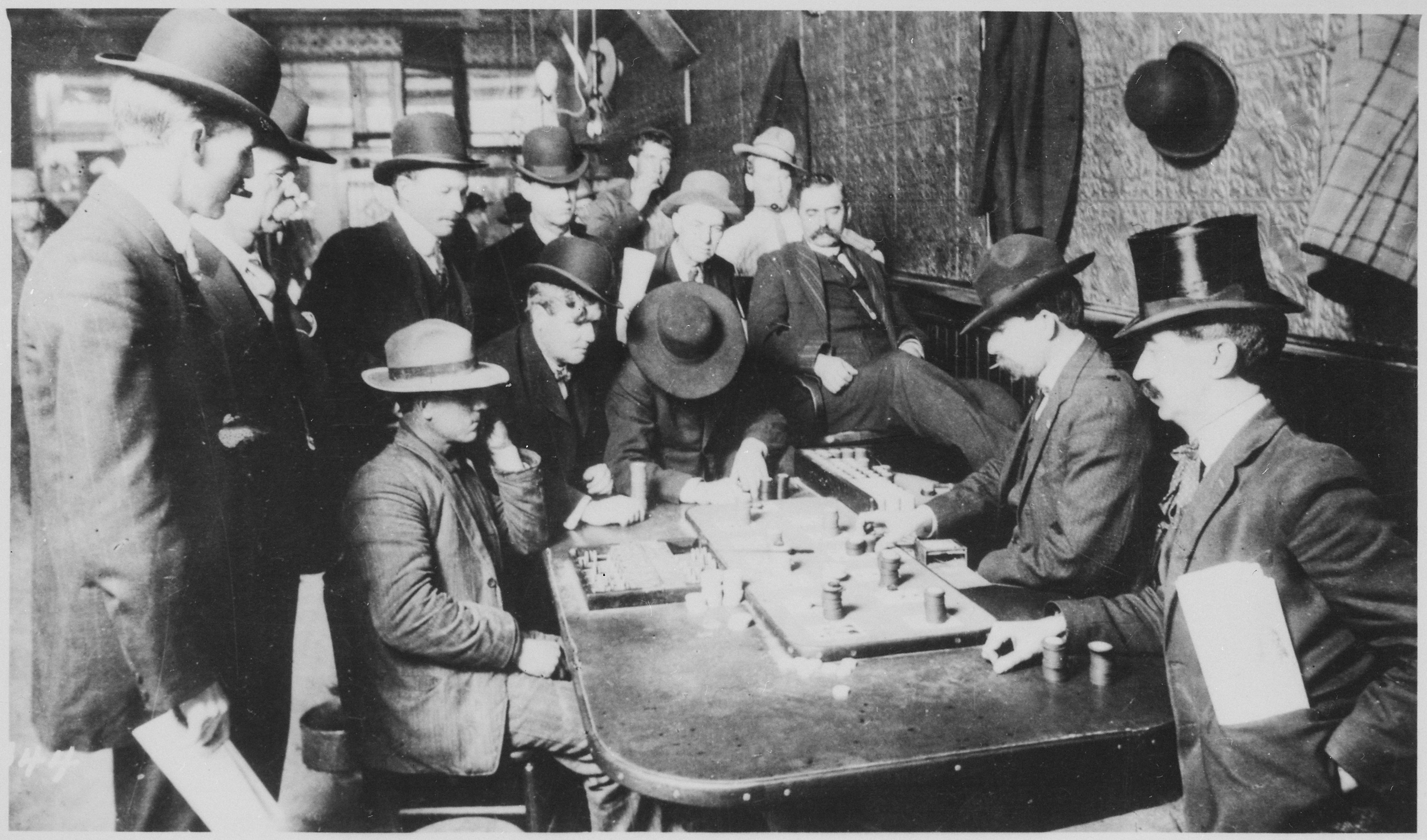
Gambling at the Orient Saloon in Bisbee, Arizona, photographed by C.S. Fly in c. 1900

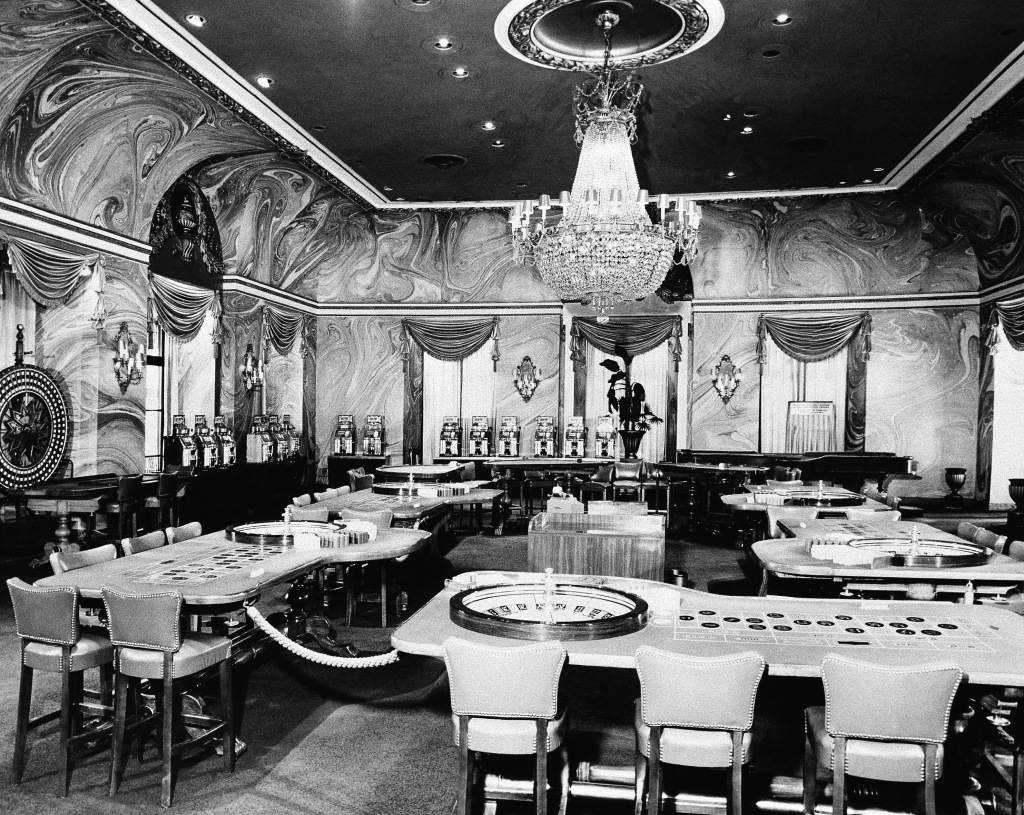
Inside the casino at the Hotel Nacional de Cuba in the 1950s. Casinos were commonplace in Cuba prior to the Cuban Revolution.

The precise origin of gambling is unknown. It is generally believed that gambling in some form or another has been seen in almost every society in history. From Ancient Mesopotamia, Greeks and Romans to Napoleon's France and Elizabethan England, much of history is filled with stories of entertainment based on games of chance.

The first known European gambling house, not called a casino although meeting the modern definition, was the Ridotto, established in Venice, Italy, in 1638 by the Great Council of Venice to provide controlled gambling during the carnival season. It was closed in 1774 as the city government felt it was impoverishing the local gentry.

In American history, early gambling establishments were known as saloons. The creation and importance of saloons was greatly influenced by four major cities: New Orleans, St. Louis, Chicago and San Francisco. It was in the saloons that travelers could find people to talk to, drink with, and often gamble with. During the early 20th century in the US, gambling was outlawed by state legislation. However, in 1931, gambling was legalized throughout the state of Nevada, where the United States's first legalized casinos were set up. In 1976 New Jersey allowed gambling in Atlantic City, now the United States's second largest gambling city.

== Gambling in casinos ==
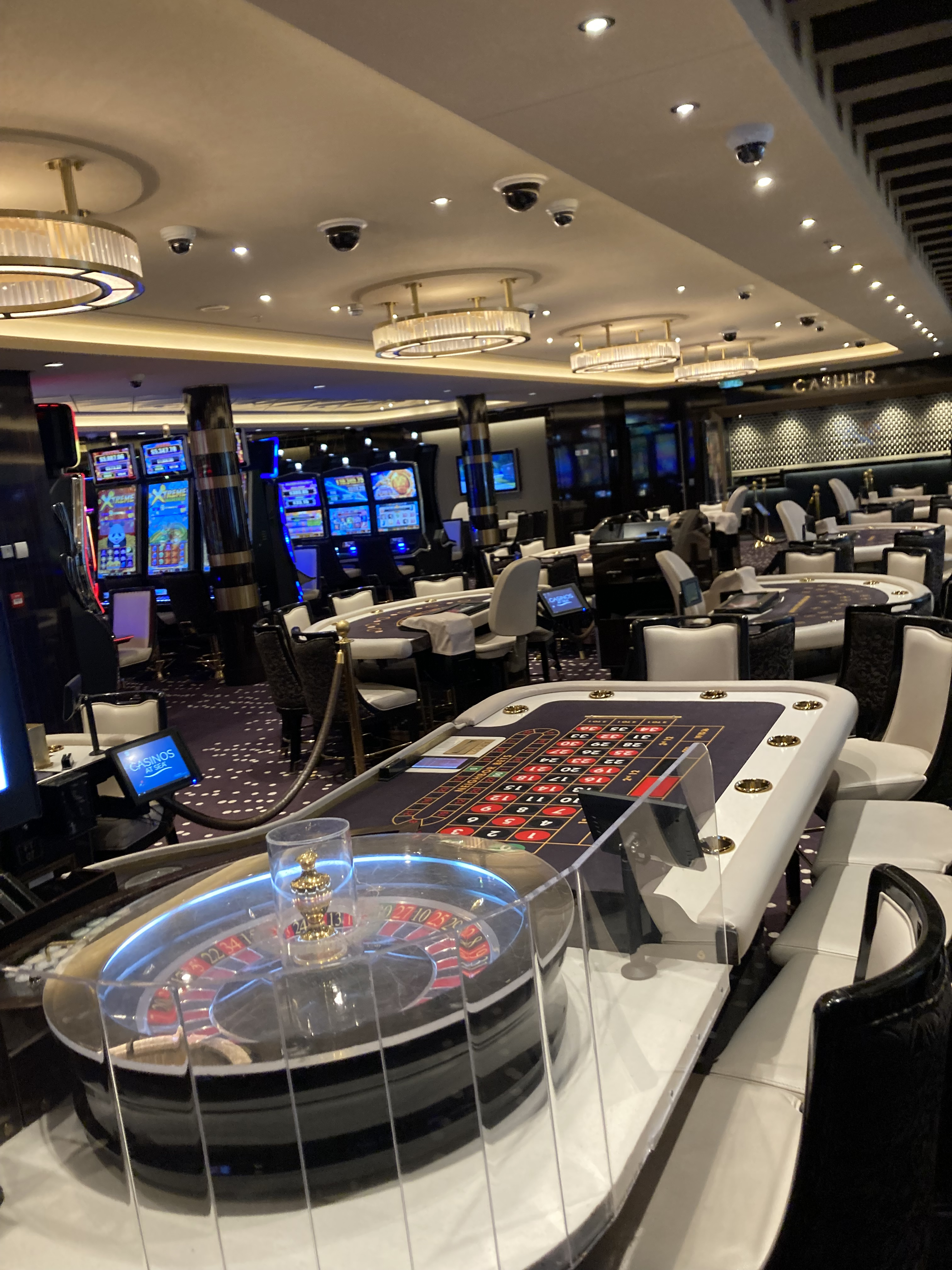
A casino on the Norwegian Cruise Line ship Bliss. Casinos are commonly found on board cruise ships.

Most jurisdictions worldwide have a minimum gambling age of 18 to 21.

Customers gamble by playing games of chance, in some cases with an element of skill, such as craps, roulette, baccarat, blackjack, and video poker. Most games have mathematically determined odds that ensure the house has at all times an advantage over the players. This can be expressed more precisely by the notion of expected value, which is uniformly negative (from the player's perspective). This advantage is called the house edge. In games such as poker where players play against each other, the house takes a commission called the rake. Casinos sometimes give out complimentary items or comps to gamblers.

Payout is the percentage of funds ("winnings") returned to players. Video lottery machines (slot machines) have become one of the most popular forms of gambling in casinos. According to an analysis of 4,222 gamblers during a two-year period, only 13.5% of them ended up actually winning money at the casino.

== Design ==
Factors influencing gambling tendencies include sound, odour and lighting. Natasha Dow Schüll, an anthropologist at the Massachusetts Institute of Technology, highlights the decision of the audio directors at Silicon Gaming to make its slot machines resonate in "the universally pleasant tone of C, sampling existing casino soundscapes to create a sound that would please but not clash".

Alan Hirsch, founder of the Smell & Taste Treatment and Research Foundation in Chicago, studied the impact of certain scents on gamblers, discerning that releasing a pleasant albeit unidentifiable mix of scents near Las Vegas slot machines generated about 50% more in daily revenue. He suggested that the scent acted as an aphrodisiac, causing a more aggressive form of gambling.

== Markets ==
The following lists major casino markets in the world with casino revenue of over US$1 billion as published in PricewaterhouseCoopers's report on the outlook for the global casino market:

=== By region ===
Rank	Region	Revenue (US$M)		
Rank	Region	2009	2010 Projected	2011 Projected
1	United States	57,240	56,500	58,030
2	Asia Pacific	21,845	32,305	41,259
3	Europe, Middle East, Africa	17,259	16,186	16,452
4	Canada	3,712	3,835	4,045
5	Latin America	425	528	594
	Total	100,481	109,354	120,380

=== By market ===
Rank	Location	No. of casinos	Revenue (US$billion)					
Rank	Location	No. of casinos	2009	2010 projected	2011 projected	2019	2020	2021
1	Macau, China	33	14.95	22.44	28.38	29	7.57	10.86
2	(United States) Las Vegas, Nevada	122	10.25	9.95	10.30	11.96	7.8	13.4
3	Singapore	2	2.12	2.75	5.48	-	-	1.67
4	France	189	3.96	3.91	3.96	11.46	10.36	11.48
5	(United States) Atlantic City, New Jersey	12	3.94	3.55	3.33	3.29	2.65	4.73
6	Australia	11	2.70	2.77	2.85	6.6	-	-
7	South Korea	17	2.40	2.43	2.51	8.2	-	-
8	Germany	76	2.07	2.05	2.08	11.52	10.52	6.51
9	South Africa	36	1.84	1.78	2.01	1.78	1.89	1.34
10	United Kingdom	141	1.21	1.19	1.21	17.22	15.4	17.09
11	Poland	36	1.09	1.09	1.13	-	-	-
12	(Canada) Niagara Falls, Ontario	2	1.10	1.11	1.20	4.8	4.27	2.18

=== By company ===
According to Bloomberg, accumulated revenue of the biggest casino operator companies worldwide amounted to almost US$55 billion in 2011. SJM Holdings Ltd. was the leading company in this field, earning $9.7 billion in 2011, followed by Las Vegas Sands Corp. at $7.4 billion. The third-biggest casino operator company (based on revenue) was Caesars Entertainment, with revenue of US$6.2 billion.

=== Significant sites ===
While there are casinos in many places, a few places have become well known specifically for gambling.

==== Monte Carlo, Monaco ====
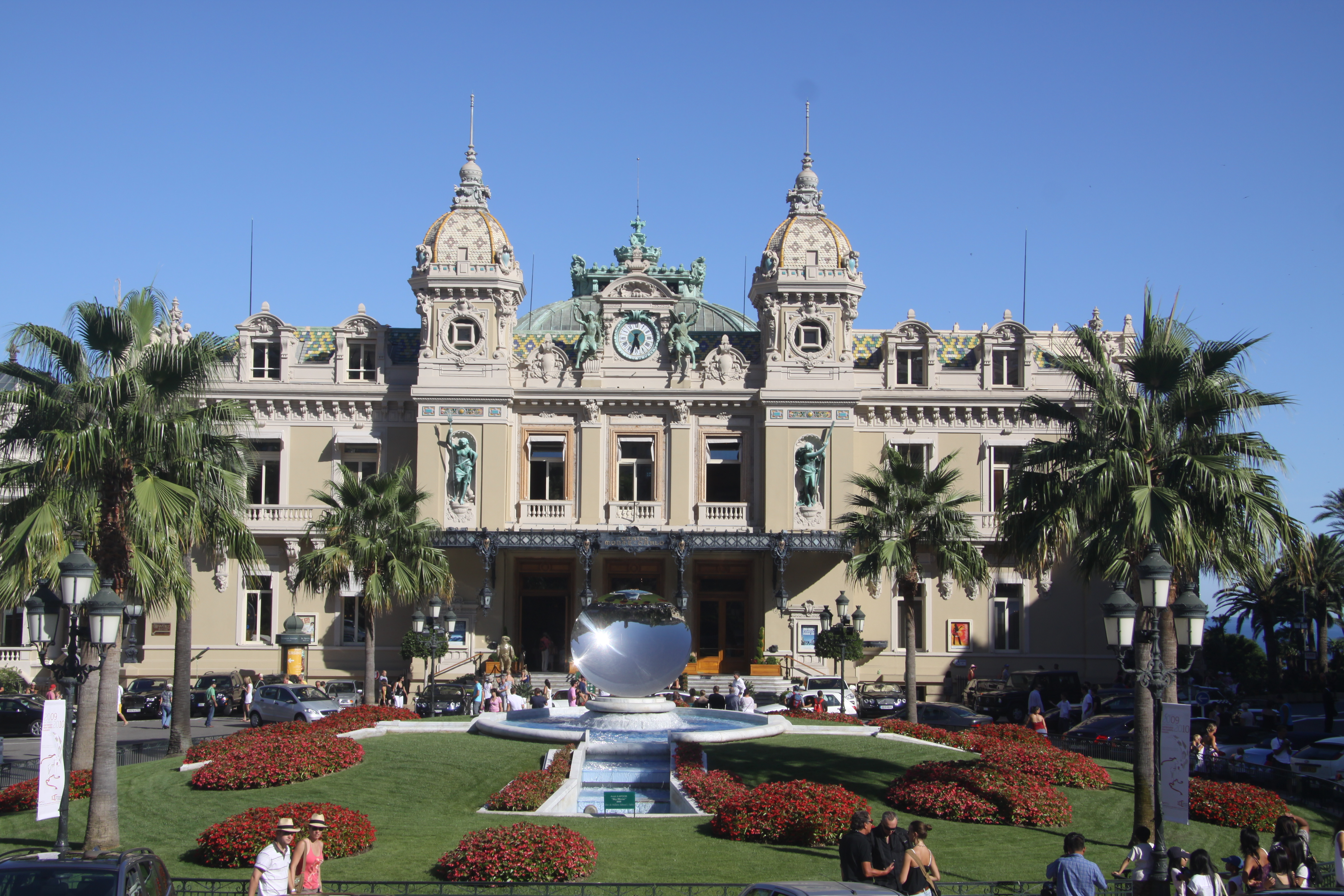
View of the Monte Carlo Casino, Monaco

Opened in 1865, Monte Carlo Casino, located in Monte Carlo city, in Monaco, is a casino and a tourist attraction.

Monte Carlo Casino has been depicted in books, songs and films. It features prominently in the James Bond films Never Say Never Again (1983) and GoldenEye (1995). Casinos feature throughout the Bond series, with the character introducing himself to the world at Les Ambassadeurs Club in Mayfair, London with the line "Bond, James Bond" in Dr. No (1962).

The Monte Carlo Casino is mentioned in the 1891 British music hall song "The Man Who Broke the Bank at Monte Carlo" as well as the 1935 film of the same name. The song was inspired by the exploits of English trickster Charles Wells, who in 1891 "broke the bank" on many occasions on the first two of his three trips to the casino.

The Monte Carlo Casino features in Ben Mezrich's 2005 book Busting Vegas, where a group of students beat the casino out of nearly $1 million. This book is based on real people and events; however, many of those events are contested by main character Semyon Dukach.

==== Campione d'Italia ====
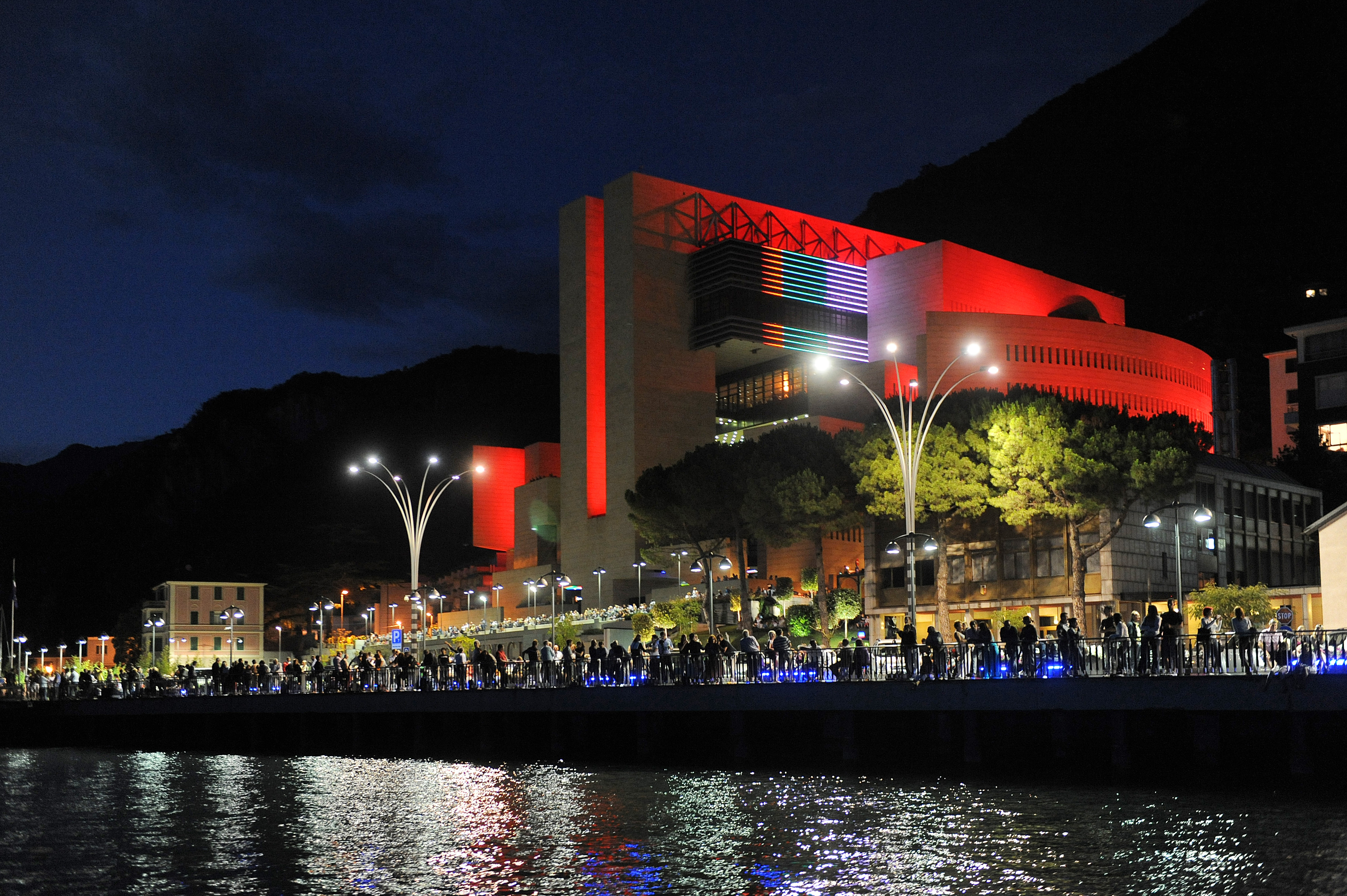
Italy's Casinò di Campione, near Lugano, is the largest casino in Europe.

Casinò di Campione is located in the tiny Italian enclave of Campione d'Italia, within Ticino, Switzerland. The casino was founded in 1917 as a site to gather information from foreign diplomats during the First World War. Today it is owned by the Italian government, and operated by the municipality. With gambling laws being less strict than in Italy and Switzerland, it is among the most popular gambling destination besides Monte Carlo. The income from the casino is sufficient for the operation of Campione without the imposition of taxes, or obtaining of other revenue. In 2007, the casino moved into new premises of more than 55,000 square metres (590,000 sq ft), making it the largest casino in Europe. The new casino was built alongside the old one, which dated from 1933 and has since been demolished.

==== Malta ====
The archipelago of Malta is a particularly famous place for casinos, standing out mainly with the historic casino located at the princely residence of Dragonara. Dragonara Palace was built in 1870. Its name comes from the Dragonara Point, the peninsula where it is built. On 15 July 1964, the palace opened as a casino.

==== Macau ====
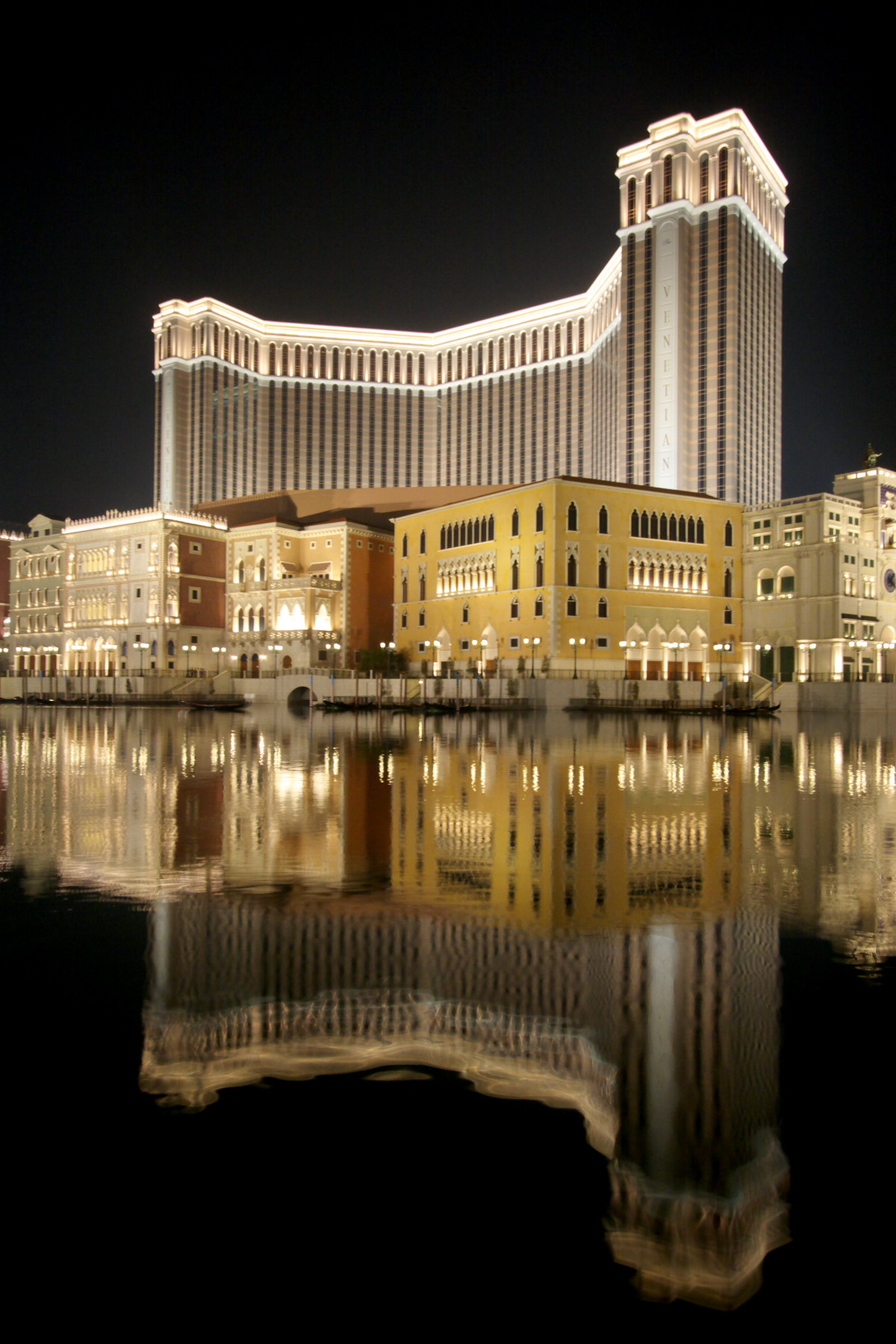
The Venetian Macao

The former Portuguese colony of Macau, a special administrative region of the People's Republic of China since 1999, is a popular destination for visitors who wish to gamble. This started in Portuguese times, when Macau was popular with visitors from nearby Hong Kong, where gambling was more closely regulated. The Venetian Macao is currently the largest casino in the world. Macau also surpassed Las Vegas as the largest gambling market in the world.

==== Germany ====
Machine-based gaming is only permitted in land-based casinos, restaurants, bars and gaming halls, and only subject to a licence. Online slots are, at the moment, only permitted if they are operated under a Schleswig-Holstein licence. AWPs are governed by federal law, namely the Trade Regulation Act and the Gaming Ordinance.

==== Portugal ====
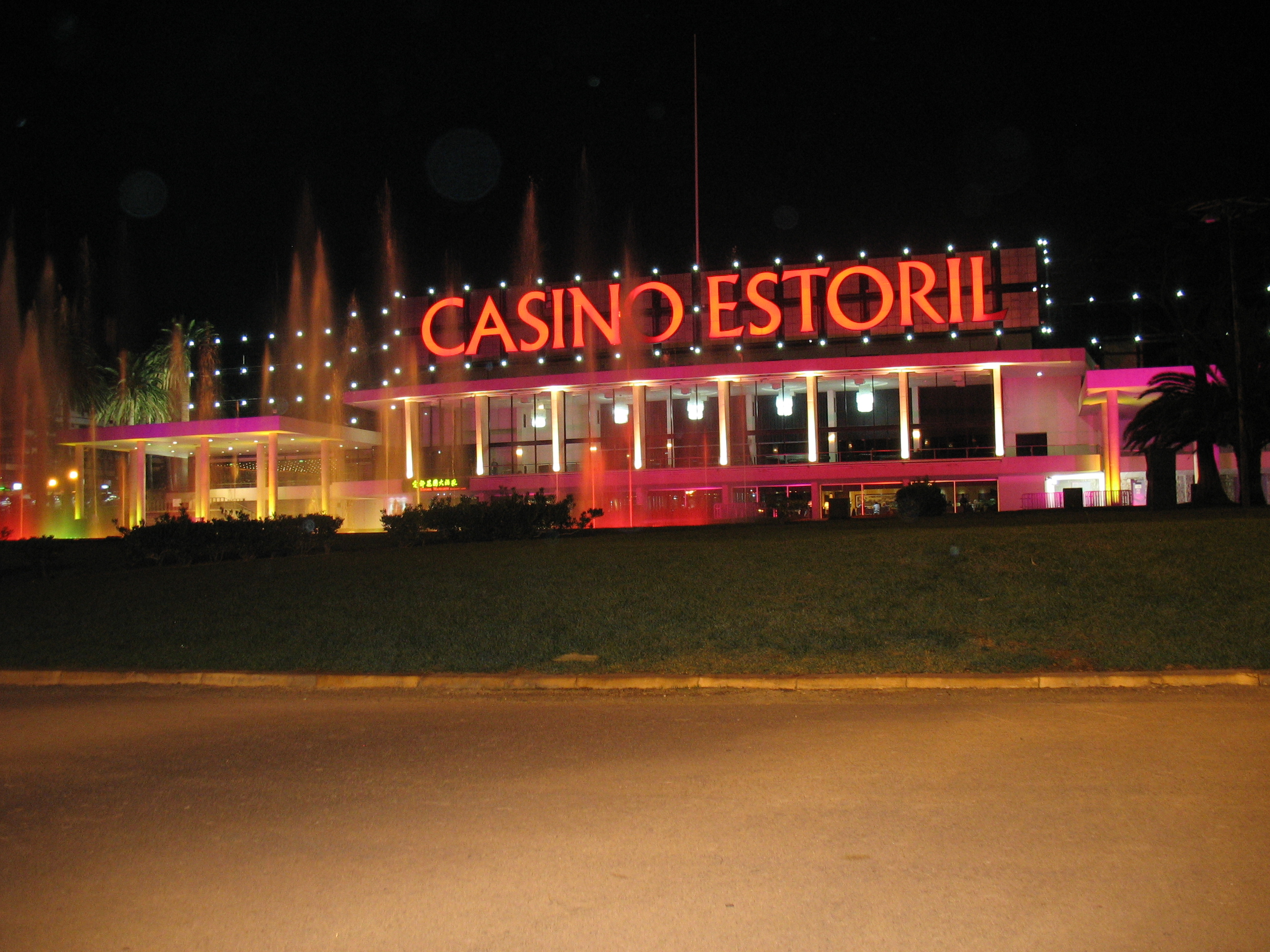
The Casino Estoril, in Portuguese Riviera, is Europe's largest casino by capacity.

The Casino Estoril, located in the municipality of Cascais, on the Portuguese Riviera, near Lisbon, is the largest casino in Europe by capacity.

During World War II, it was reputed to be a gathering point for spies, dispossessed royals, and wartime adventurers; it became an inspiration for Ian Fleming's James Bond 007 novel Casino Royale.

==== Russia ====
There are four legal gaming zones in Russia: "Siberian Coin" (Altay), "Yantarnaya" (Kaliningrad region), "Azov-city" (Rostov region) and "Primorie" (Primorie region).

==== Singapore ====
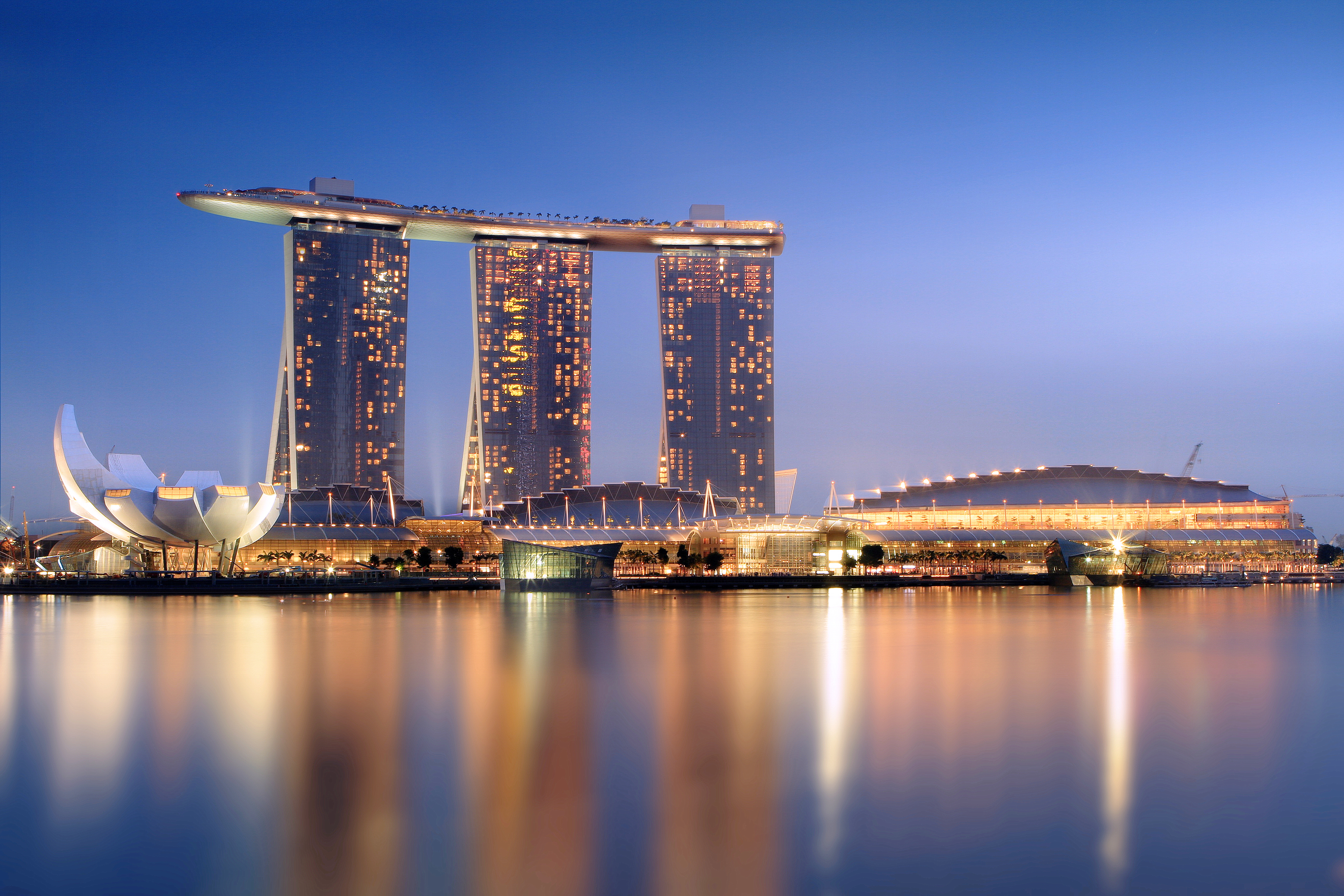
View of the Marina Bay Sands in Marina Bay, Singapore

Singapore is an up-and-coming destination for visitors wanting to gamble, although there are currently only two casinos (both foreign owned), in Singapore. The Marina Bay Sands is the second most expensive standalone casino in the world, at a price of US$6.8 billion, and is among the world's ten most expensive buildings.

==== United States ====
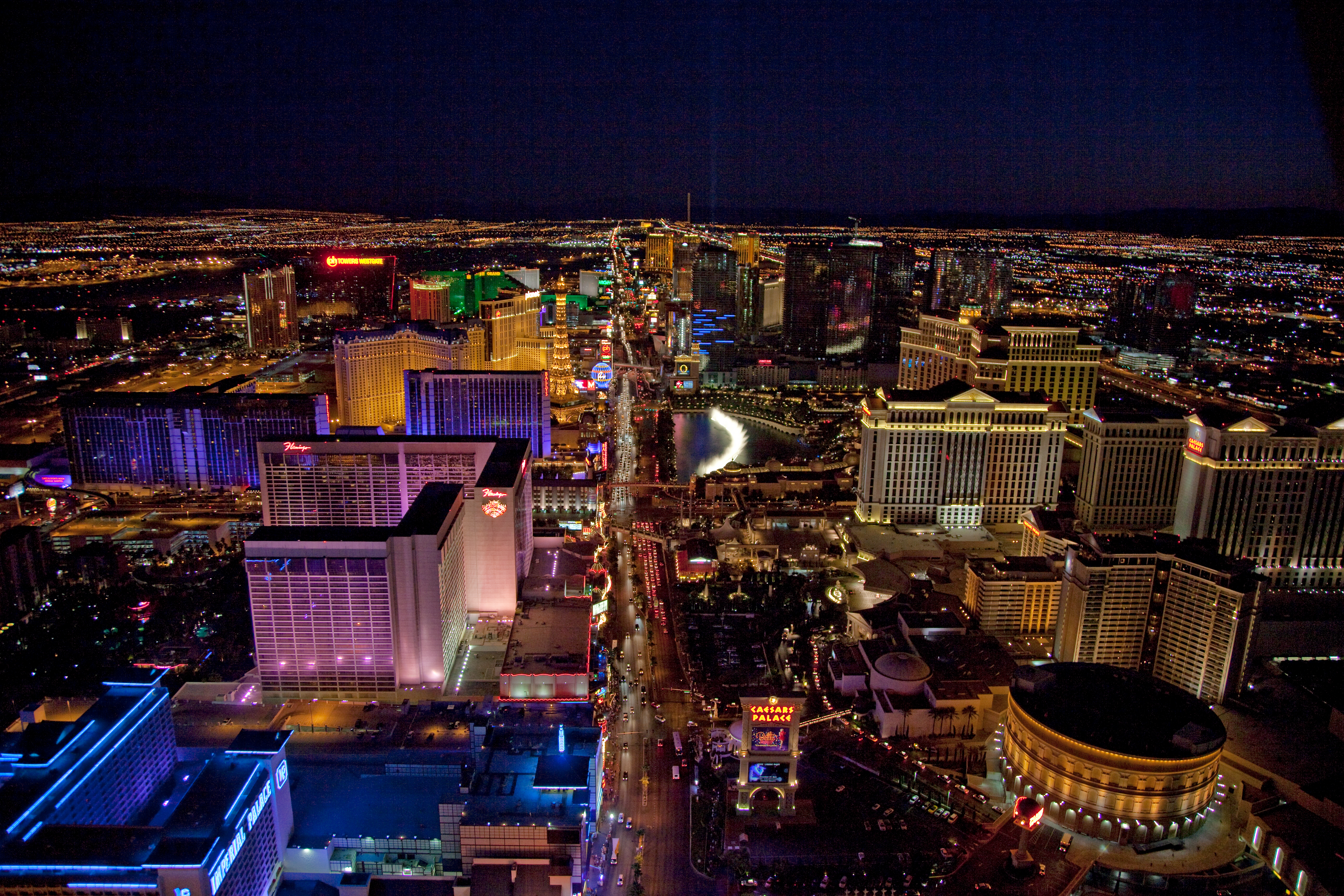
The Las Vegas Strip in Las Vegas, the heart of the gambling industry in the United States

With currently over 1,000 casinos, the United States has the largest number of casinos in the world. The number continues to grow steadily as more states seek to legalize casinos. 40 states now have some form of casino gambling. Interstate competition, such as gaining tourism, has been a driving factor to continuous legalization. Relatively small places such as Las Vegas are best known for gambling; larger cities such as Chicago are not defined by their casinos despite the large turnover.

The Las Vegas Valley has the largest concentration of casinos in the United States. Based on revenue, Atlantic City, New Jersey, ranks second, and the Chicago region third.

Top American casino markets by revenue (2022 annual revenues):

1. Las Vegas Strip $7.05 billion
2. Atlantic City $2.57 billion
3. Chicago region $2.01 billion
4. Baltimore–Washington Metropolitan Area $2.00 billion
5. Mississippi Gulf Coast $1.61 billion
6. New York City $1.46 billion
7. Philadelphia $1.40 billion
8. Detroit $1.29 billion
9. St. Louis $1.03 billion
10. Boulder Strip $967 million
11. Reno/Sparks $889 million
12. Kansas City $861 million
13. The Poconos $849 million
14. Lake Charles, Louisiana $843 million
15. Black Hawk/Central City $812 million
16. Downtown Las Vegas $731 million
17. Tunica/Lula $696 million
18. Cincinnati $655 million
19. Shreveport/Bossier City $646 million
20. Pittsburgh/Meadowlands $630 million

The Nevada Gaming Control Board divides Clark County, which is coextensive with the Las Vegas metropolitan area, into seven market regions for reporting purposes.

Native American gaming has been responsible for a rise in the number of casinos outside of Las Vegas and Atlantic City.

==== Vietnam ====
In Vietnam, the term "casinos" encompasses gambling activities within the country. Unofficially defined, a "casino" typically denotes a well-established and professional gambling establishment that is generally lawful but exclusively caters to foreign players. On the other hand, "gambling houses" or "gambling dens" are smaller, illicit gambling venues.

As of 2022, Vietnam has 9 operating casinos, including: Đồ Sơn casino (Hải Phòng), Lợi Lai casino, Hoàng Gia casino (Quảng Ninh), Hồng Vận casino (Quảng Ninh), Lào Cai casino (Lào Cai), Silver Shores casino (Đà Nẵng), Hồ Tràm casino (Bà Rịa – Vũng Tàu), Nam Hội An casino (Quảng Nam), Phú Quốc casino in Kien Giang.

In a survey conducted by the Vietnamese Institute for Sustainable Regional Development and released on September 30, 2015, it was found that 71% of the respondents held the belief that allowing Vietnamese individuals to access casinos would result in an increase in the number of players. Furthermore, 47.4% of the participants expressed the view that engaging in rewarding recreational activities has a positive impact on job opportunities for residents. Additionally, 46.2% of the respondents believed that such activities contribute positively to Vietnam's ability to attract investments.

== Security ==
A sign at the Thousand Islands Casino

Given the large amounts of currency handled within a casino, both patrons and staff may be tempted to cheat and steal, in collusion or independently; casinos have security measures to prevent this. Security cameras located throughout the casino are the most basic measure.

Modern casino security is usually divided between a physical security force and a specialized surveillance department. The physical security force usually patrols the casino and responds to calls for assistance and reports of suspicious or definite criminal activity. A specialized surveillance department operates the casino's closed-circuit-television system, known in the industry as the eye in the sky. Both of these specialized casino security departments work very closely with each other to ensure the safety of both guests and the casino's assets, and have been quite successful in preventing crime. Some casinos also have catwalks in the ceiling above the casino floor, which allow surveillance personnel to look directly down, through one way glass, on the activities at the tables and slot machines.

When it opened in 1989, The Mirage was the first casino to use cameras full-time on all table games.

In addition to cameras and other technological measures, casinos also enforce security through rules of conduct and behavior; for example, players at card games are required to keep the cards they are holding in their hands visible at all times.

== Business practices ==
Over the past few decades, casinos have developed many different marketing techniques for attracting and maintaining loyal patrons. Many casinos use a loyalty rewards program used to track players' spending habits and target their patrons more effectively, by sending mailings with free slot play and other promotions. Casino Helsinki in Helsinki, Finland, for example, donates all of its profits to charity.

== Environmental issues ==
Modern casinos frequently replace gambling equipment. For example, each deck of cards is only used for 2-4 hours before being destroyed, and dice are replaced approximately every 8 hours. Globally, over 500,000 sets of dice cups are discarded annually, with casinos contributing 70% of this waste. Frequent replacement of gambling equipment exacerbates energy waste and also causes environmental problems. Poker cards are mainly made of plastic-coated paper, which is difficult to degrade, resulting in a large amount of waste. The replacement cycle for intelligent equipment such as slot machines and electronic gambling tables has shortened from 5-6 years to 3-4 years, mainly due to technological iterations (such as VR interaction and blockchain settlement) and regulatory upgrades (such as anti-money laundering systems). Globally, over 100,000 units of discarded casino equipment are generated annually, containing large amounts of metals (steel, aluminum), electronic components (circuit boards, chips), and plastics. Circuit boards contain heavy metals such as lead, mercury, and cadmium, and the electrolyte in capacitors may leak, polluting soil and water sources. Traditional ABS plastics require 500 years to degrade, and incineration produces dioxins.

== Crime ==
Casinos have been linked to organised crime, with early casinos in Las Vegas originally dominated by the American Mafia and in Macau by Triad syndicates.

According to some police reports, local incidence of reported crime often doubles or triples within three years of a casino's opening. In a 2004 report by the US Department of Justice, researchers interviewed people who had been arrested in Las Vegas and Des Moines and found that the percentage of problem or pathological gamblers among the arrestees was three to five times higher than in the general population.

It has been said that economic studies showing a positive relationship between casinos and crime usually fail to consider the visiting population: they count crimes committed by visitors but do not count visitors in the population measure, which overstates the crime rate. Part of the reason this methodology is used, despite the overstatement, is that reliable data on tourist count are often not available.

== Occupational health and safety ==
Casinos are subject to specific regulations for worker safety, as casino employees are both at greater risk for cancers resulting from exposure to second-hand tobacco smoke and musculoskeletal injuries from repetitive motions while running table games over many hours. These are not the extent of the hazards casino workers may be exposed to, but every location is different. Most casinos do not meet the requirements for certain protective measures, such as protection against airborne metal dusts from coins or hearing protection against high noise levels, though these measures are still implemented when evaluated and determined necessary.

== Gallery ==
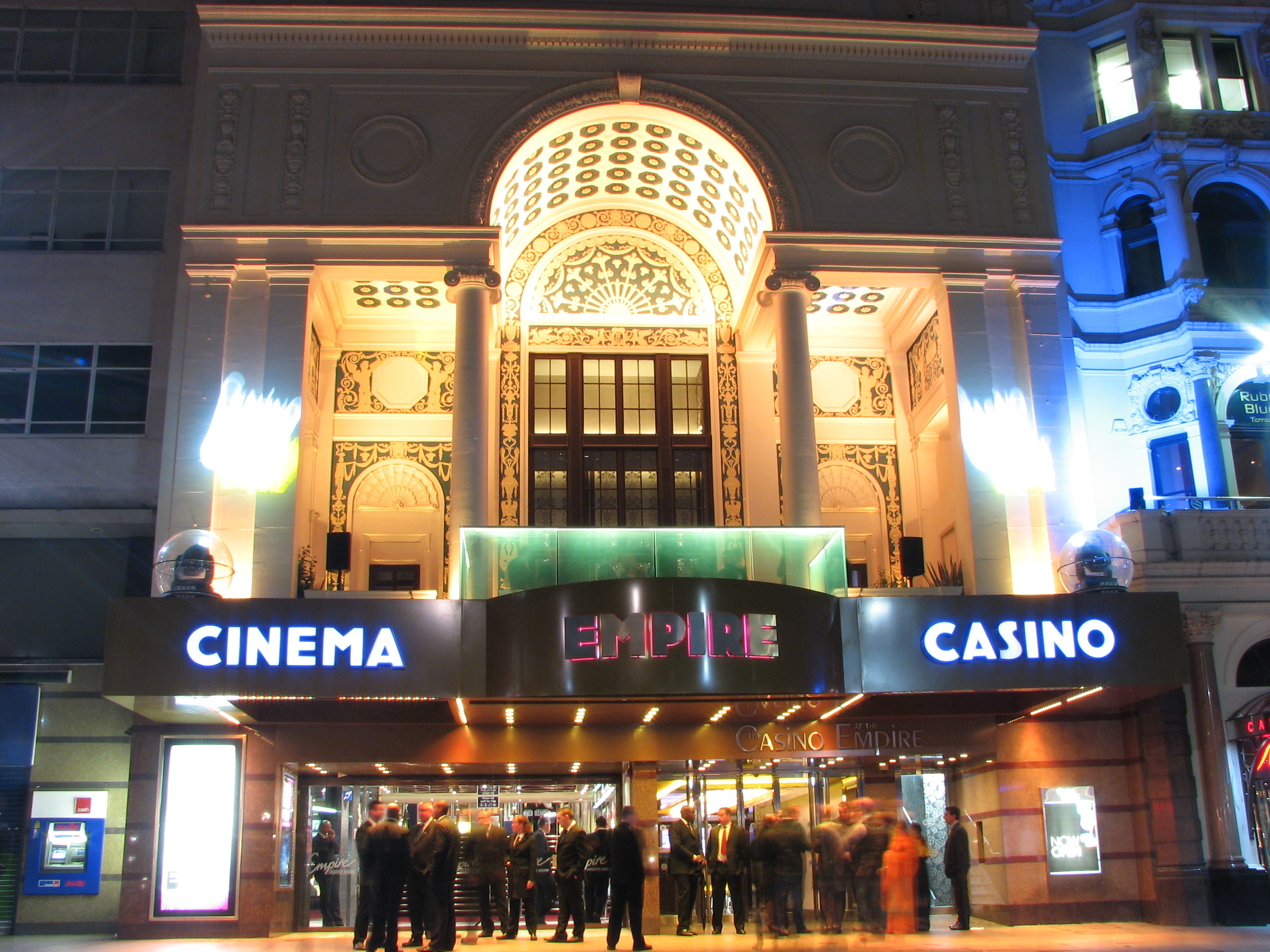
The Empire at Leicester Square in London also includes a casino.

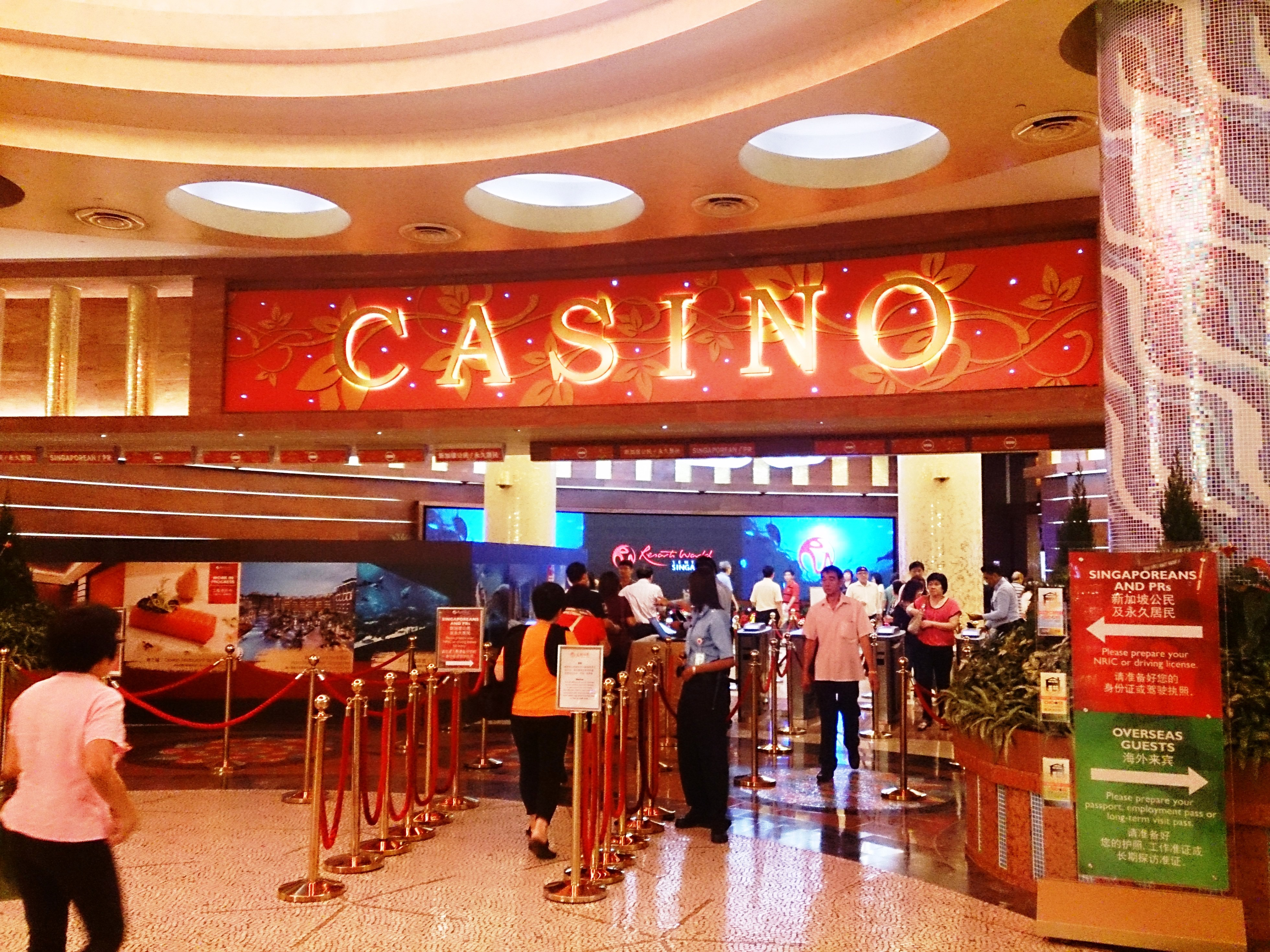
Entrance to the casino at Resorts World Sentosa, Singapore

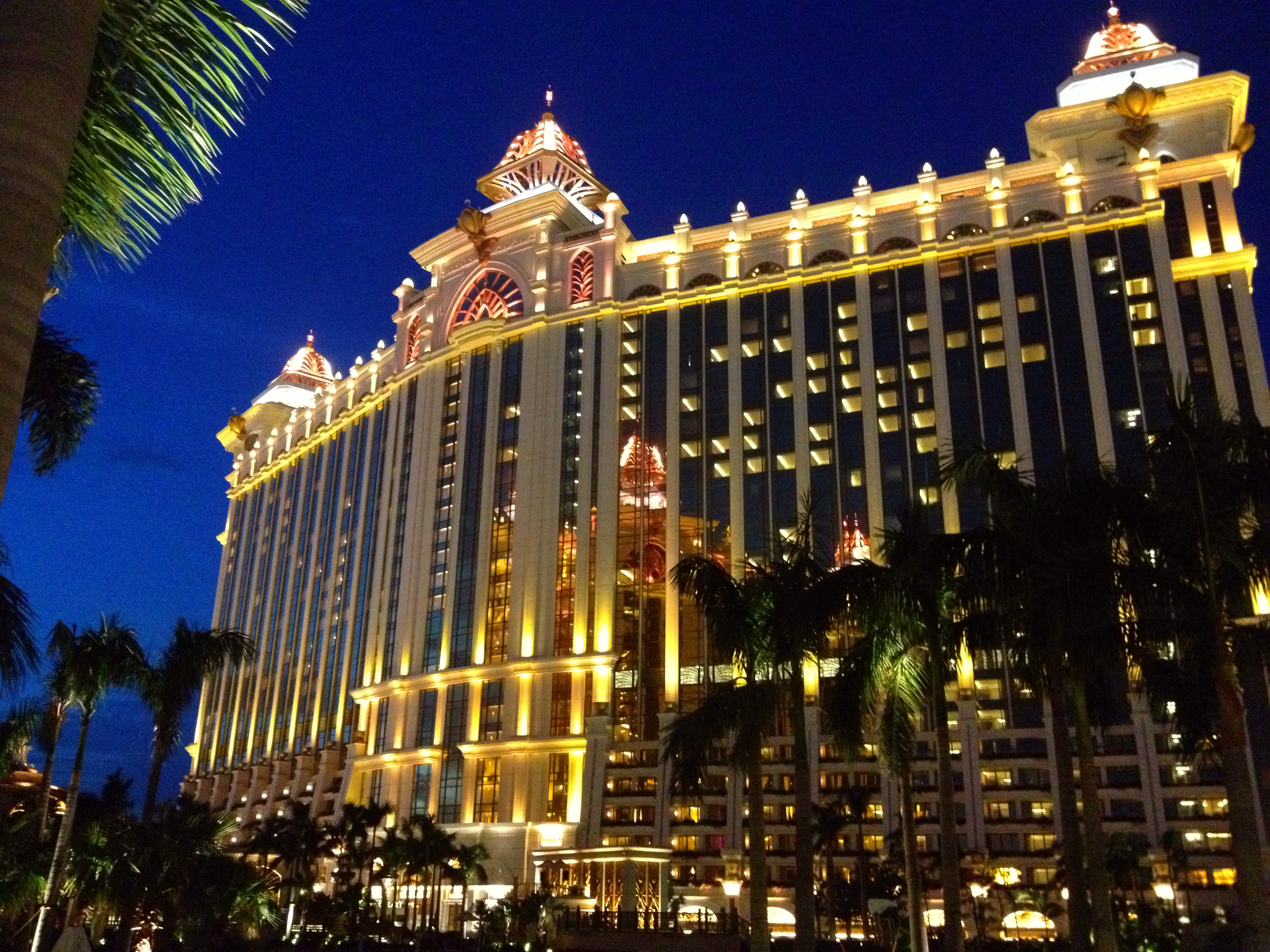
The Galaxy Macau at night in Cotai, Macau

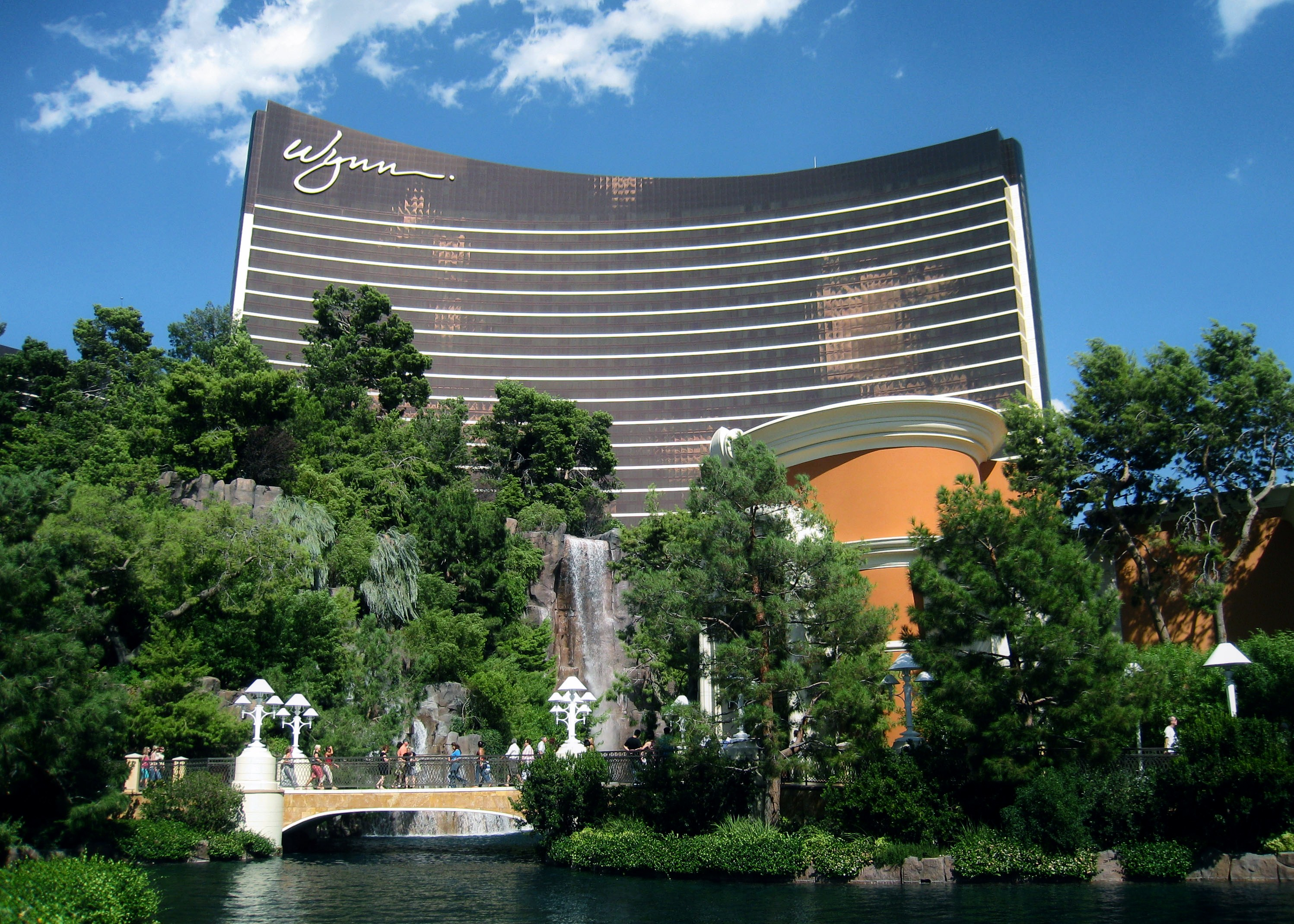
Wynn Las Vegas in Paradise, Nevada, United States

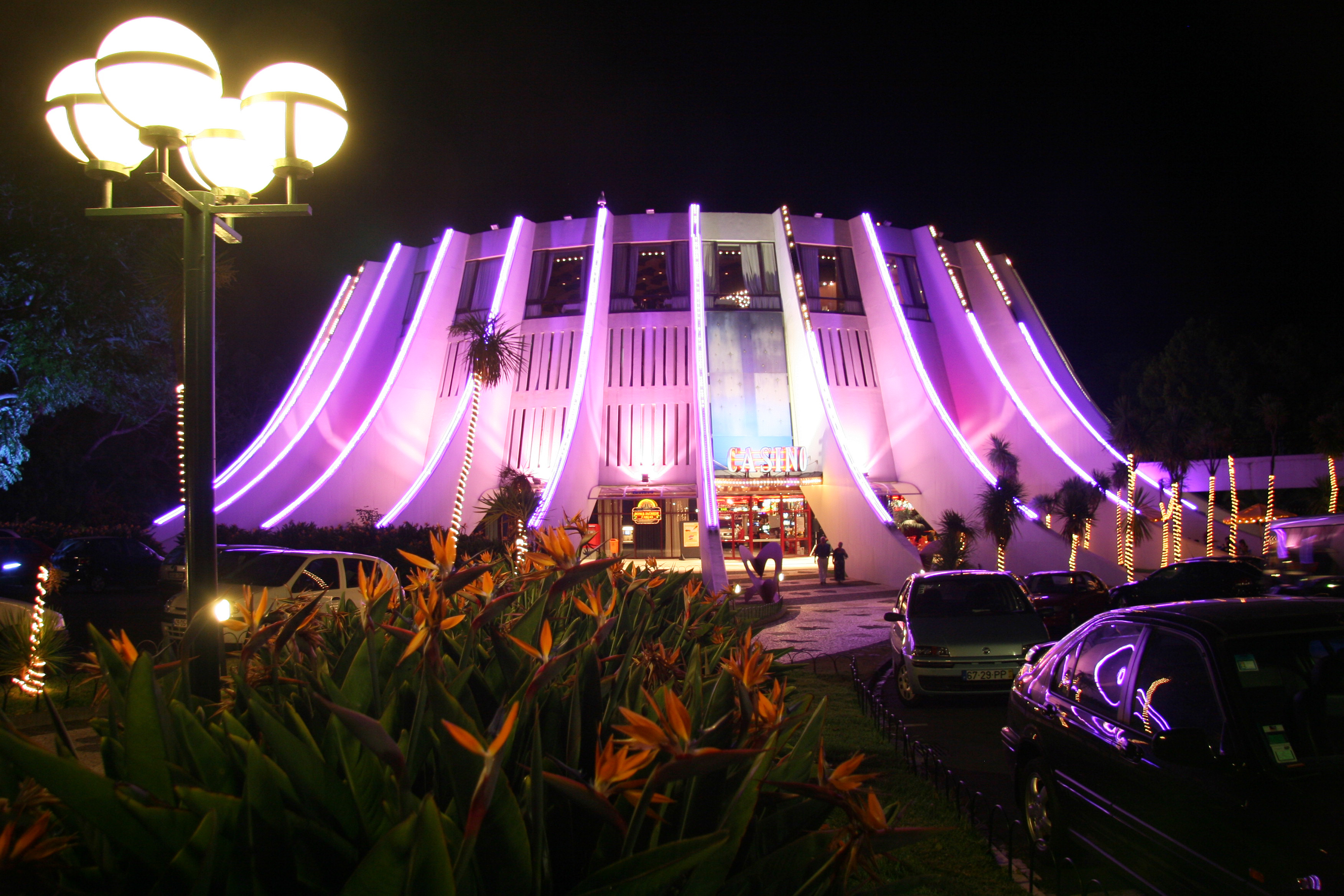
The Casino da Madeira in Funchal, Madeira, Portugal

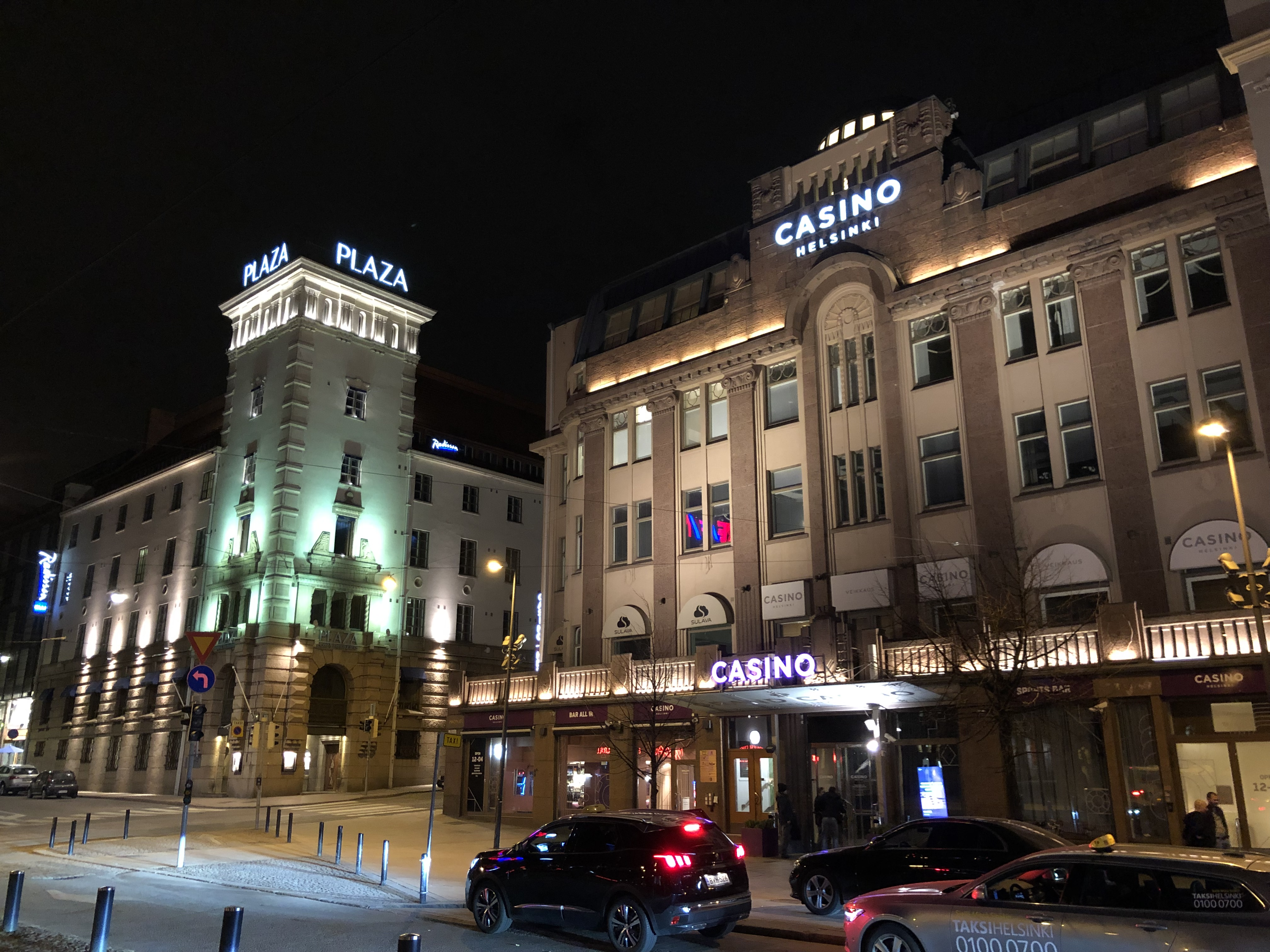
The Casino Helsinki at night in Helsinki, Finland

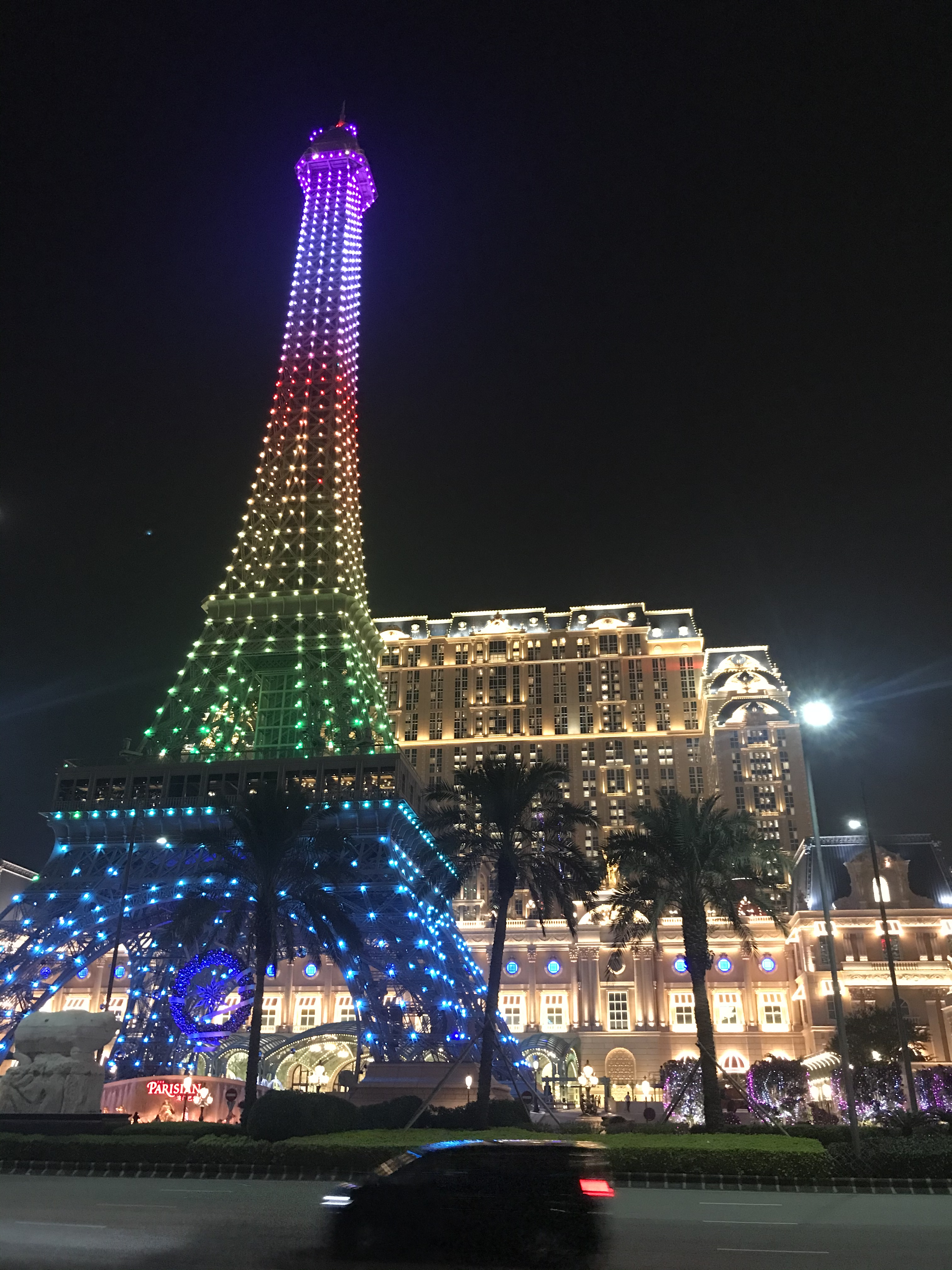
The Parisian Macao is a casino resort on the Cotai Strip in Cotai, Macau, which features a half-scale Eiffel Tower as one of its landmarks.

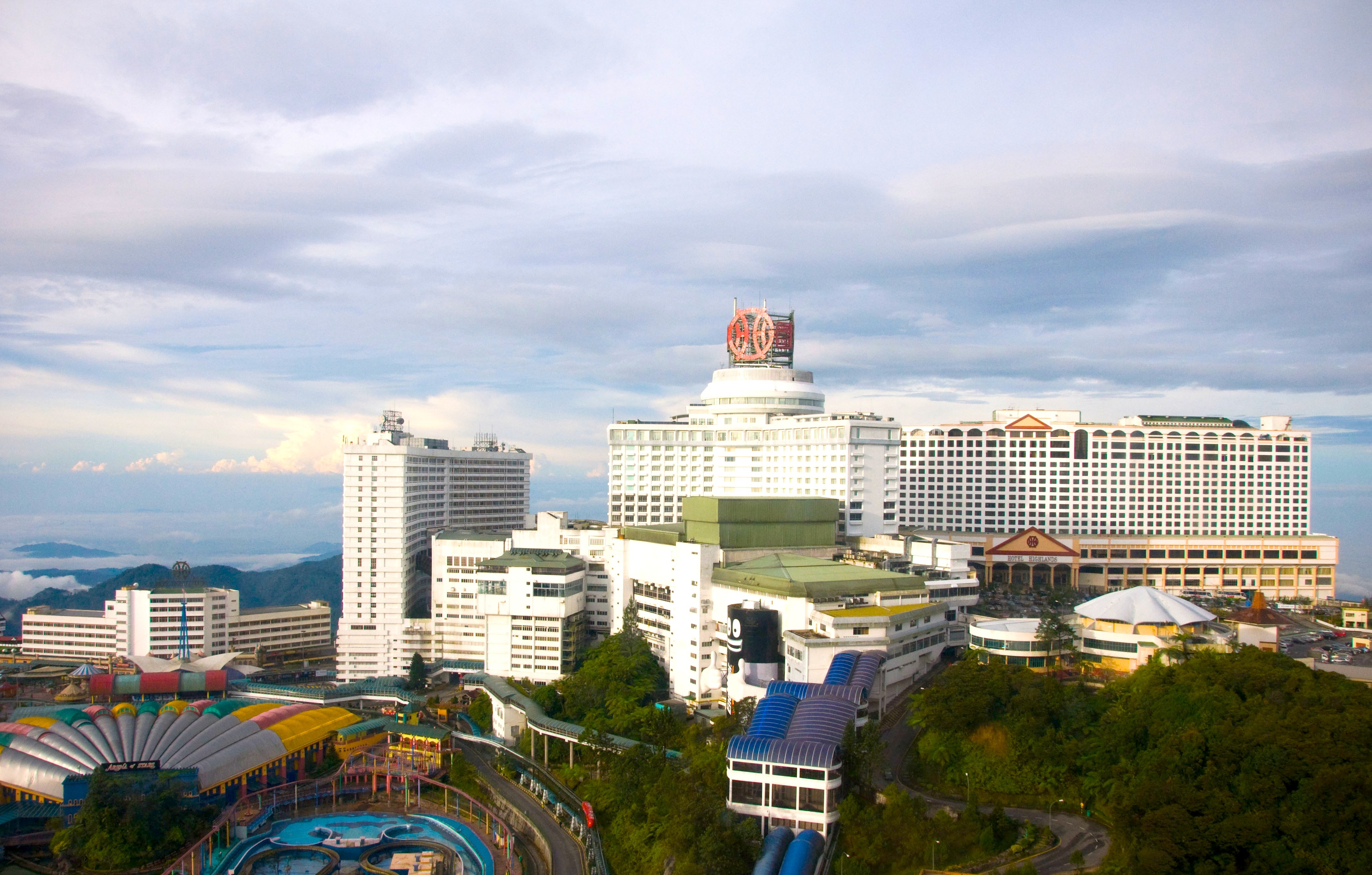
The casino in Genting Highlands, Malaysia owned by Genting Group

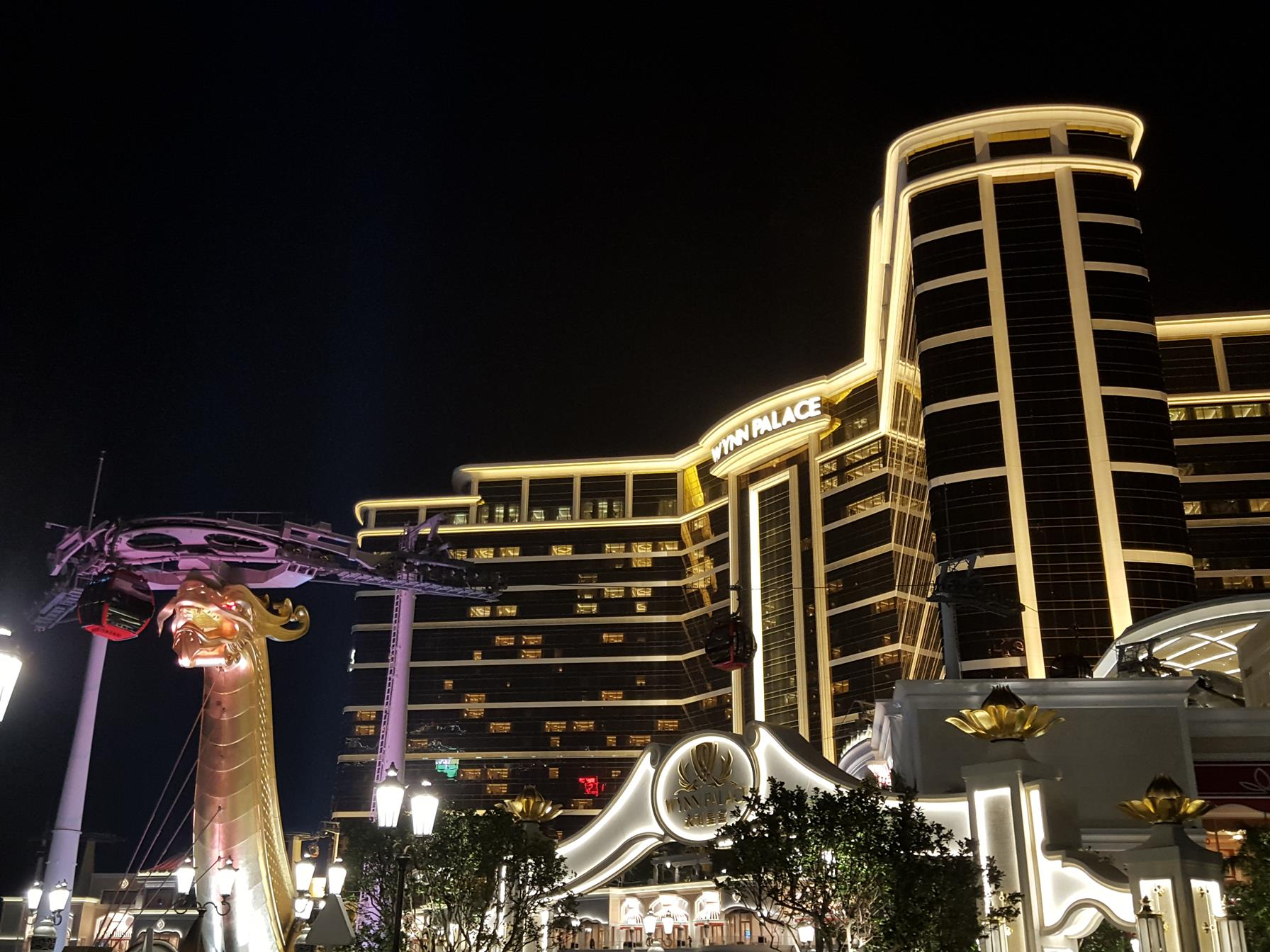
Wynn Palace, a luxury integrated resort from developer Wynn Resorts, located in Macau, China

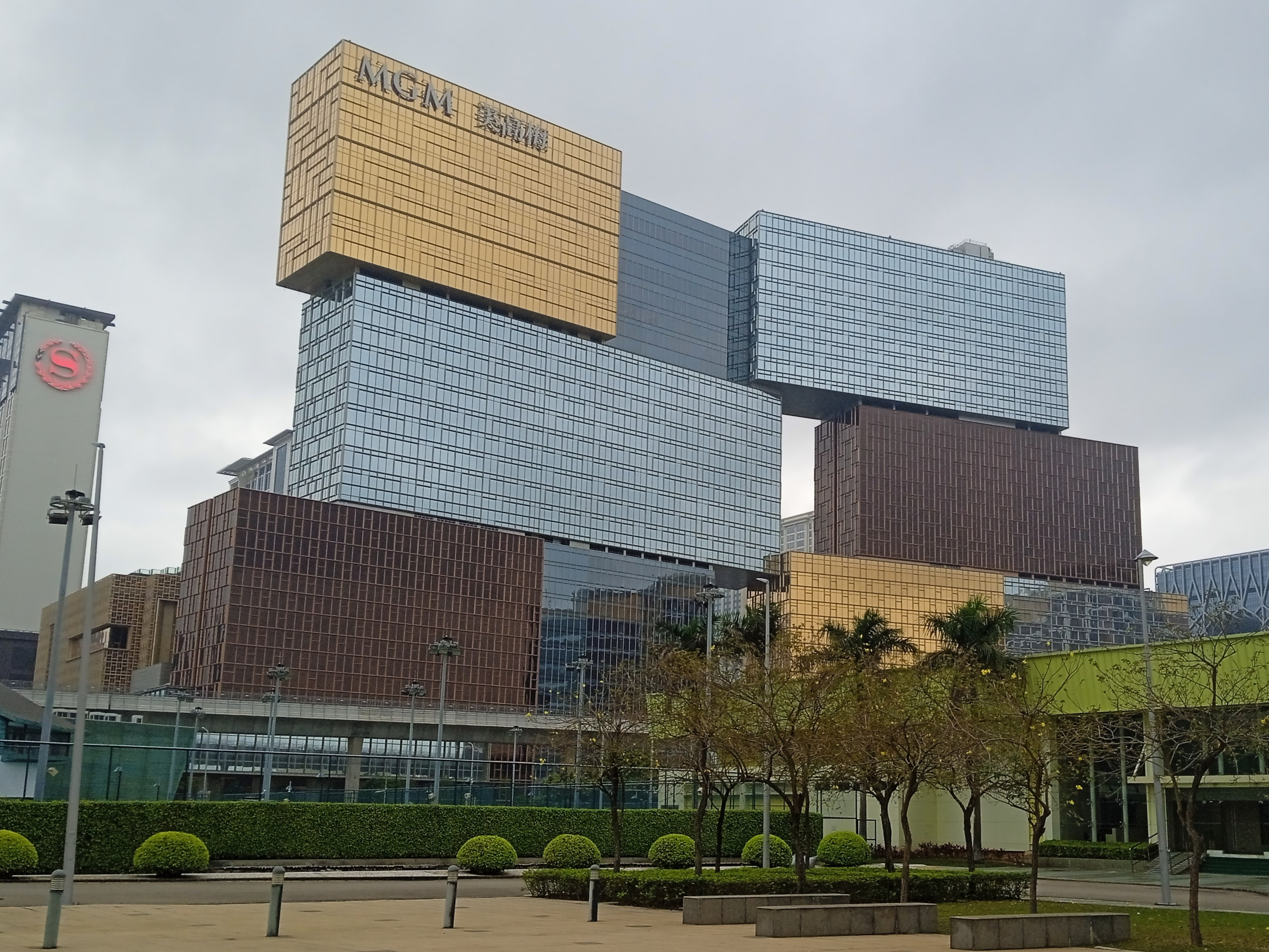
MGM Cotai owned by MGM Resorts International, located in Cotai, Macau

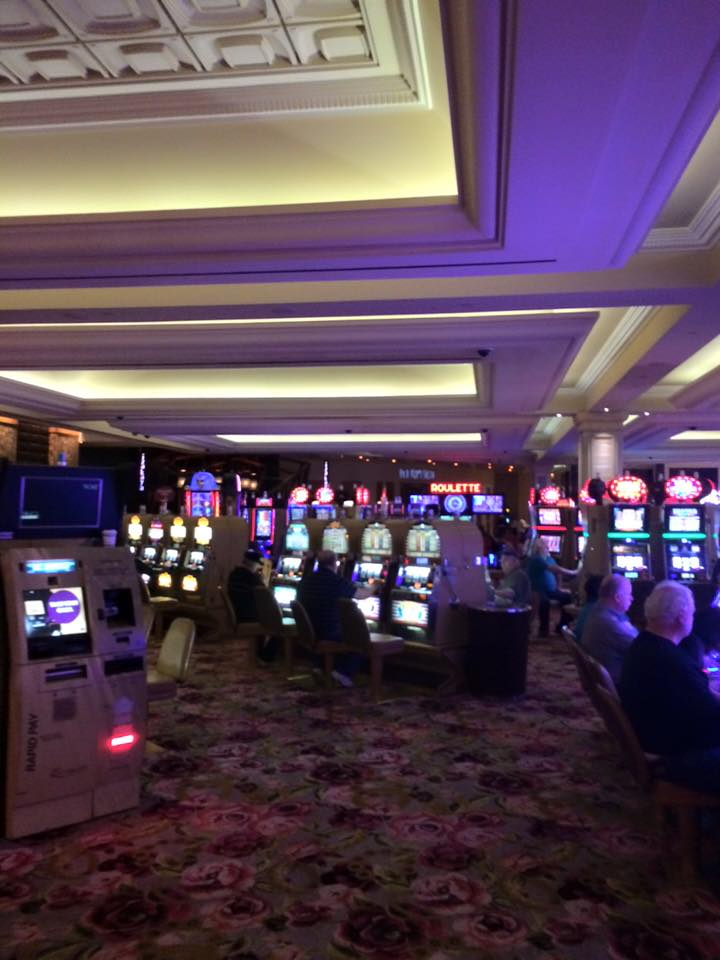
Slot machines at the Borgata Hotel Casino & Spa in Atlantic City, New Jersey, United States

== See also ==
- American Gaming Association
- Black Book (gaming)
- Casino chip
- Casino hotel
  - List of casino hotels
  - List of integrated resorts
- Casinos in Goa
- EUROMAT (European Gaming & Amusement Federation)
- Gambling
- Gambling in Macau
- Gambling in Metro Manila
- Gambling in Mexico
- Gambling in the United States
- Gaming control board
- Gaming law
- Global Gaming Expo
- List of casinos
- Locals casino
- Native American gaming
- Online casino
- Online gambling
- Online poker
- Sports betting
