= Casino Helsinki =

Casino in Helsinki, Finland

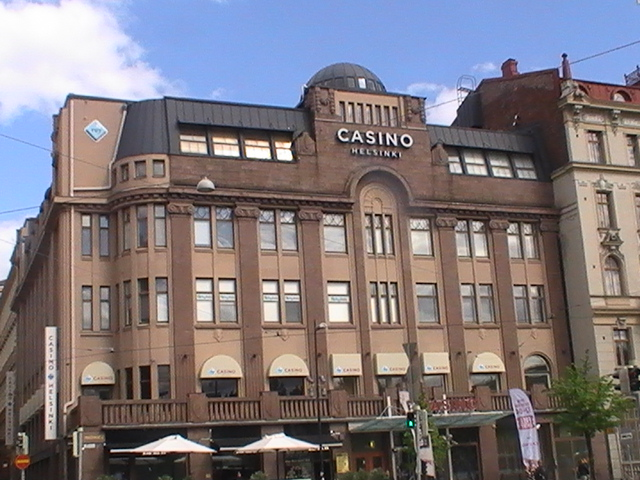
- Casino Helsinki in May 2012

- The location of the casino in Helsinki
- Interactive map of Casino Helsinki
- Location: Mikonkatu 19 00100, Helsinki, Finland; 60°10′18.58″N 24°56′43.88″E
- Opened: December 1, 1991; 34 years ago
- Gaming space: 2,600 square metres (28,000 sq ft)
- Casino type: Land-based
- Owner: Veikkaus
- Website: www.casinohelsinki.fi/en

Casino Helsinki is a casino located in Helsinki, Finland, located less than a ten minute walk from Central Railway Station. It's owned by government-owned Veikkaus. Casino Helsinki employs around 200 people, and it had around 305,000 visitors in 2009 with around 30 million euros of revenue.

The predecessor of the casino, Casino Ray, founded by the Slot Machine Association and opened in December 1991, operated in Kamppi, in the Hotel Presidentti building.

The casino is open Sunday-Thursday from 3 pm to 2 am and Friday-Saturday from 3 pm to 4 am. It has around 300 slot machines, over 20 gaming tables and a poker room. The two-story casino has around 2,600 square metres (28,000 sq ft) of space.

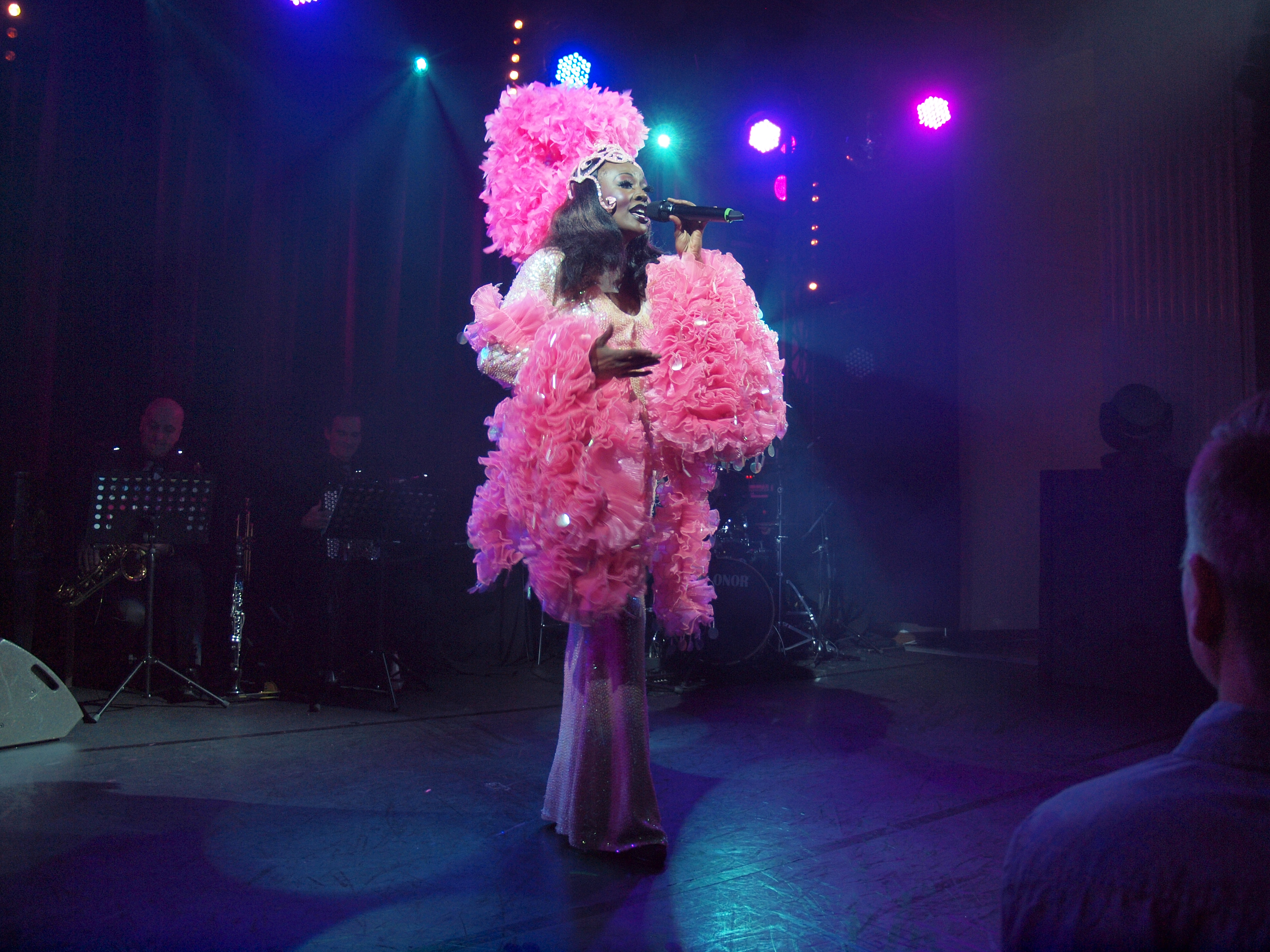
Casino Helsinki features a show and dinner restaurant combining dinner with performance shows.

== Games ==
=== Table Games ===
The selection of table games includes American roulette, blackjack, oasis poker, baccarat and Dynamic Poker Pro.

=== Poker ===
There are seven poker tables at the casino. Depending on the demand, they may offer Texas Hold'em, Omaha Hold'em, Five-Card Stud, Seven-Card Stud, Chinese Poker, and Dealer's Choice. In addition to cash games, Casino Helsinki offers weekly tournaments and even the annual Finnish Poker Championships.

The most common forms of poker at Casino Helsinki are Texas Hold'em and Omaha Hold'em. The casino takes a 5% rake from cash game pots up to €14.

=== Bad Beat Jackpot ===
All of the regular cash game poker games at Casino Helsinki are a part of a bad beat jackpot. If six or more players have been dealt a hand and the game goes to the flop, one euro of rake is taken from the pot (in addition to standard rake) and it goes to the jackpot.

In September 2021 the operator Veikkaus has added set loss limits to its land-based slot machines.
