= Finland's Slot Machine Association =

Finnish nonprofit gaming association

- Raha-automaattiyhdistys
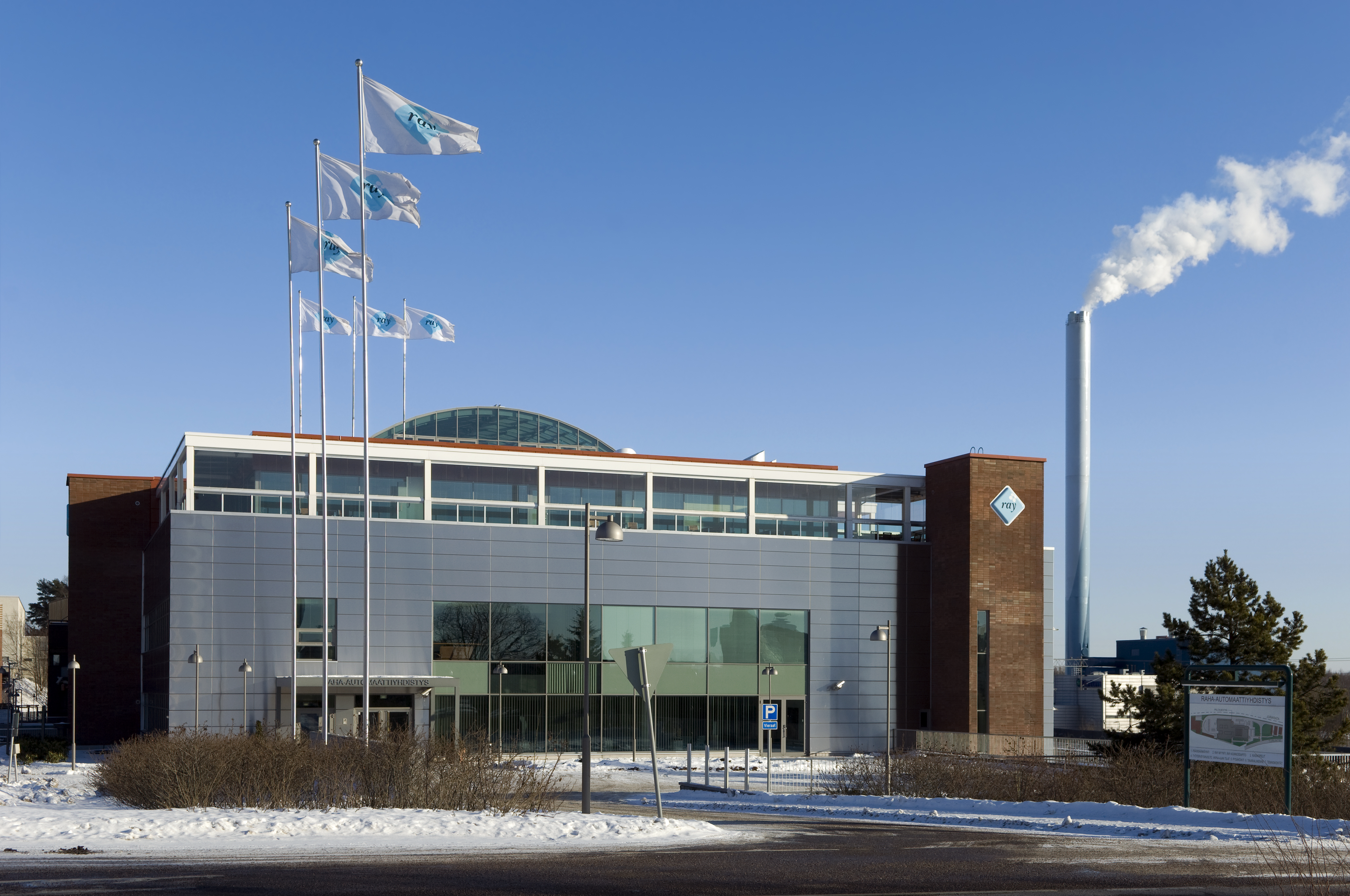
- RAY's Headquarters in 2009
- Formation: April 1, 1938
- Dissolved: December 31, 2016; 9 years ago
- Type: Statutory corporation
- Headquarters: Espoo, Finland
- Fields: Gambling
- CEO: Velipekka Nummikoski (last)

Finland's Slot Machine Association or RAY (Finnish: Raha-automaattiyhdistys) was a government-supervised and -owned nonprofit gaming (gambling) association (statutory corporation) in Finland. On January 1, 2017, RAY merged with the government-supervised and owned nonprofit betting agency Veikkaus and Fintoto. The new company that was founded as a result is also called "Veikkaus". RAY was a gambling monopoly whose proceedings went to domestic charity such as pensioner care and gambling addiction treatment. While RAY was best known for its slot machines, the company also dealt in online gambling and controlled the only official casino in Finland, Casino Helsinki.

RAY's operations were governed by legislation and decrees. The operations of the other Finnish gaming organisations, Veikkaus and Fintoto, are also based on the Finnish Lotteries Act. The act was last amended in 2012.

RAY's revenue came from slot machines, casino games, and casino and digital gaming. All the proceeds from RAY's gaming operations were used to support Finnish health and welfare, and these funding decisions were also based on legislation.

The history of the Tuplapotti predecessor, the Potti game, dates back to 1986, and in the 1990s, a newer version of it was developed that rose to much greater popularity than its predecessor. The game was developed by Veikkaus (by then known as RAY), and the game is still one of the favorite gambling games in Finland.

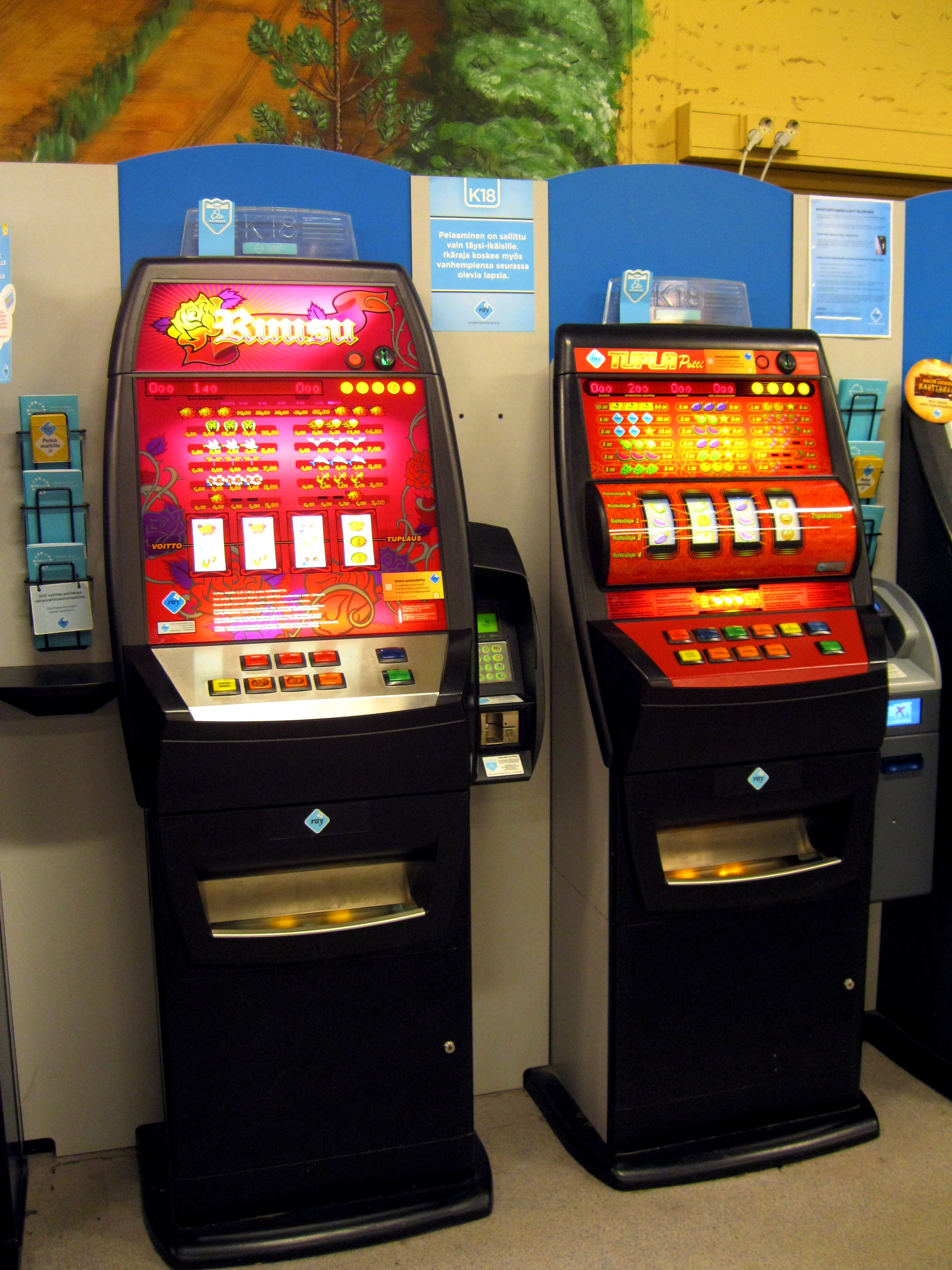
Veikkaus gamehall inside a Prisma (chain store) showing RAY's Ruusu and Tuplapotti slot machines

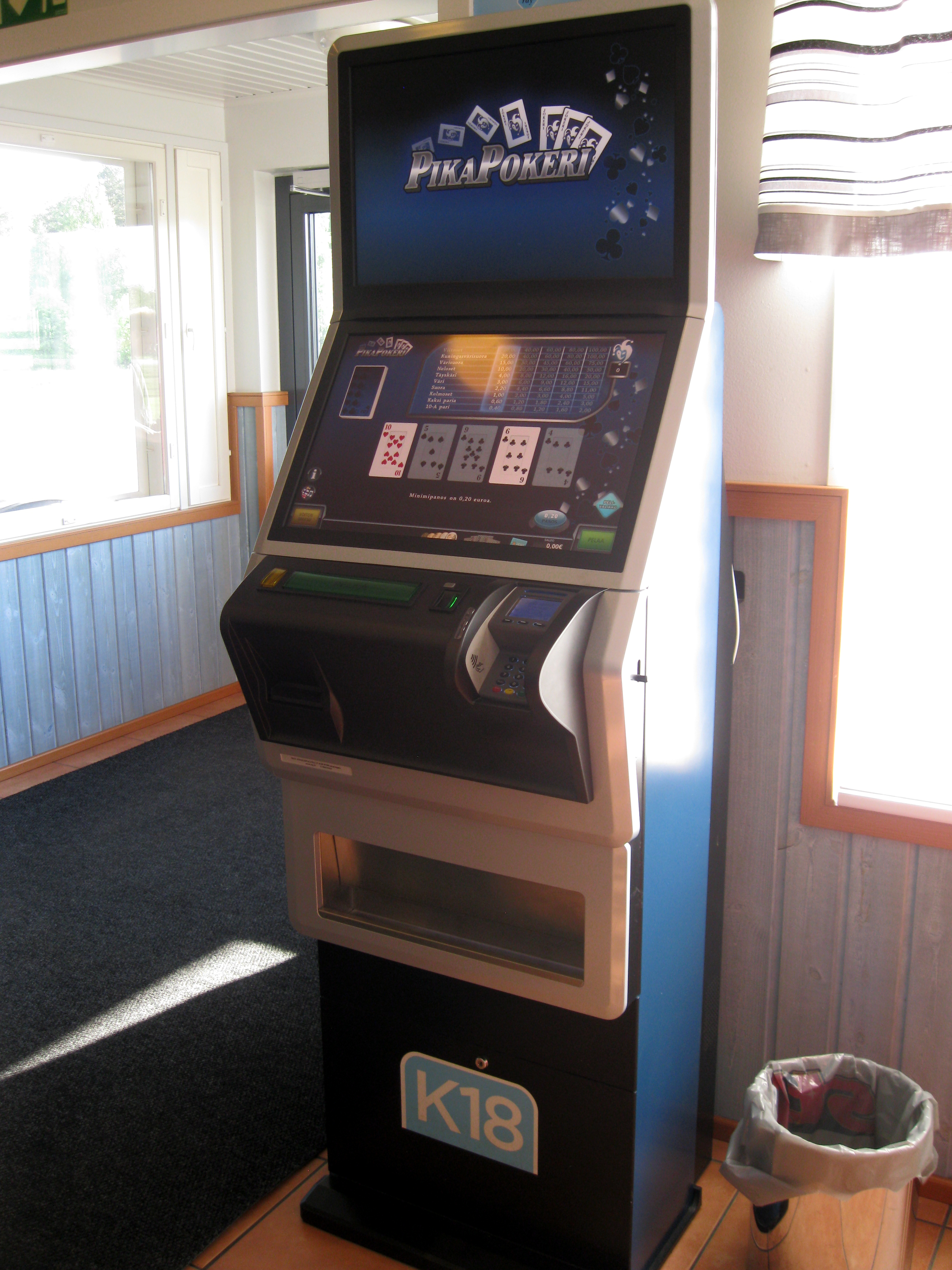
RAY's PikaPokeri slot machines

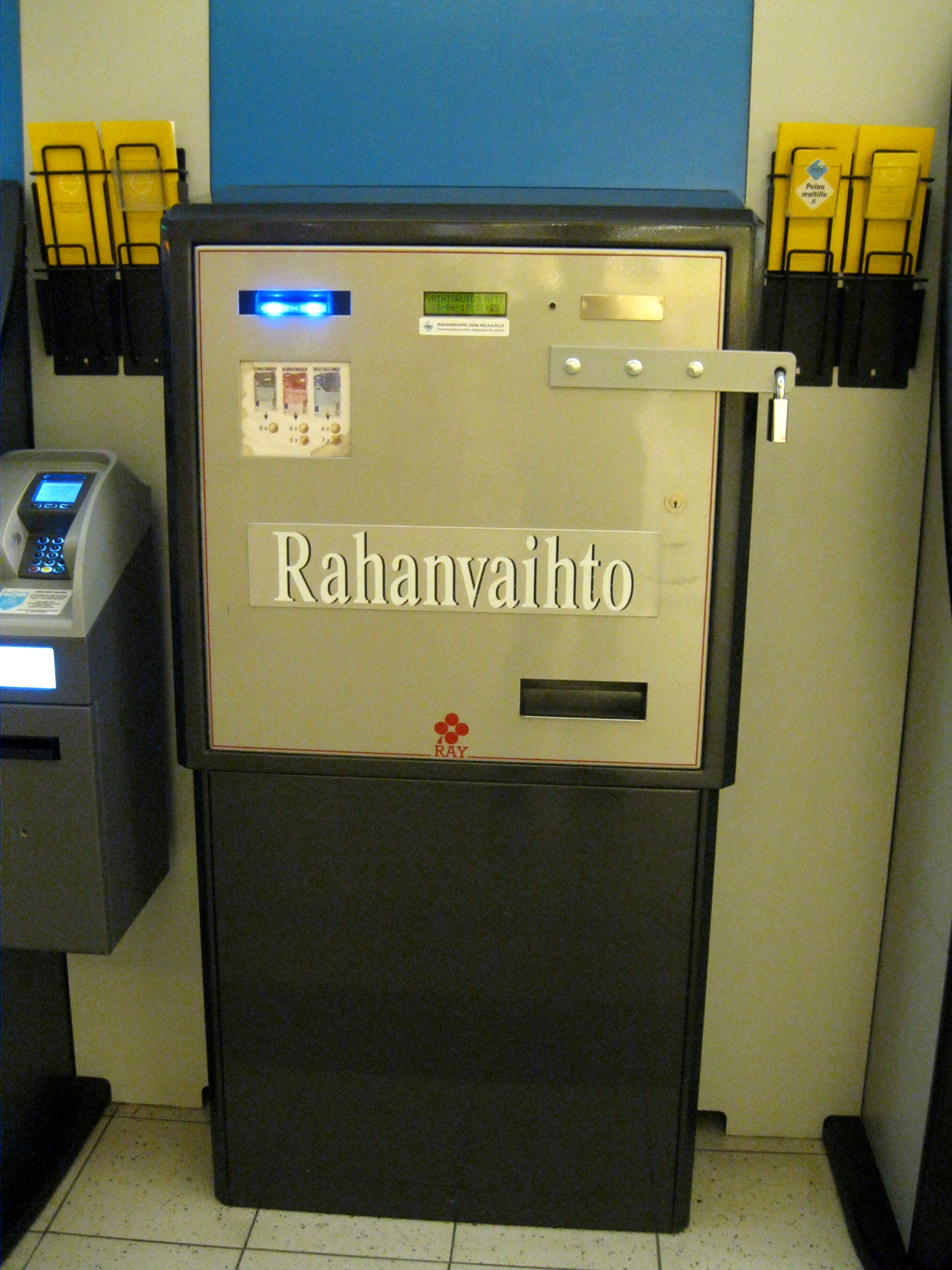
RAY Money exchange machine
