= Veikkaus =

Finnish gambling agency

Veikkaus Oy
- Company type: Limited company
- Industry: Gambling
- Founded: 1 January 2017
- Headquarters: Helsinki, Finland
- Owner: Finnish government
- Number of employees: c. 2000 (2018)
- Website: www.veikkaus.fi

Veikkaus Oy is a Finnish government-owned betting agency which holds a monopoly in the country. It was formed in 2017 as a merger of three previously existing betting and gambling agencies of Veikkaus, Fintoto and Finland's Slot Machine Association.

In January 2019, Veikkaus announced a plan to reduce its workforce by around 400 positions, while also announcing "significant overhauls of our gaming locations and an end to the restaurant gaming table business".

A survey, conducted by Finnish polling specialist Bilendi on behalf of Kasino Curt, says that more Finns support than oppose the idea of abolishing Finland’s gambling monopoly and adopting a gambling licence system. The interviews were conducted within Bilendi Oy’s nationwide consumer panel during March 20 to 24 2019. The survey error margin is ±3.1 percentage points. The survey found that 31 per cent of Finns want to abolish the gambling monopoly and adopt a gambling licence system instead, whereas 27 per cent of Finns are against the idea. The rest either cannot say their opinion or have a neutral stance in the matter.

In September 2022, the CEO of Veikkaus Olli Sarekoski spoke in the favor of abolishing the Veikkaus monopoly due to the company's inability to meet the Finns' gambling needs, as more than 60% of online gambling in Finland has shifted to unregulated markets.

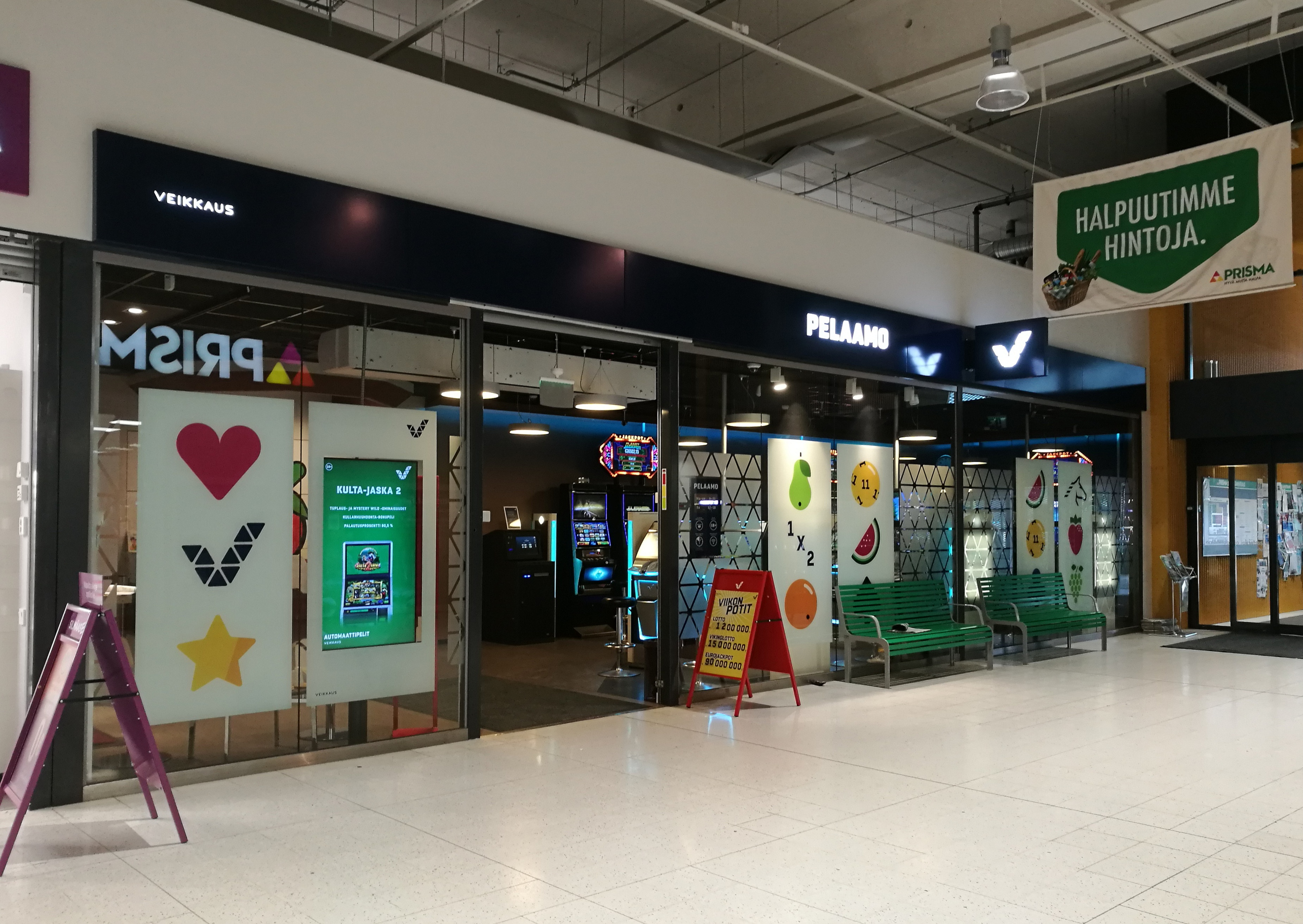
Veikkaus arcade inside a Prisma supermarket in Oulu

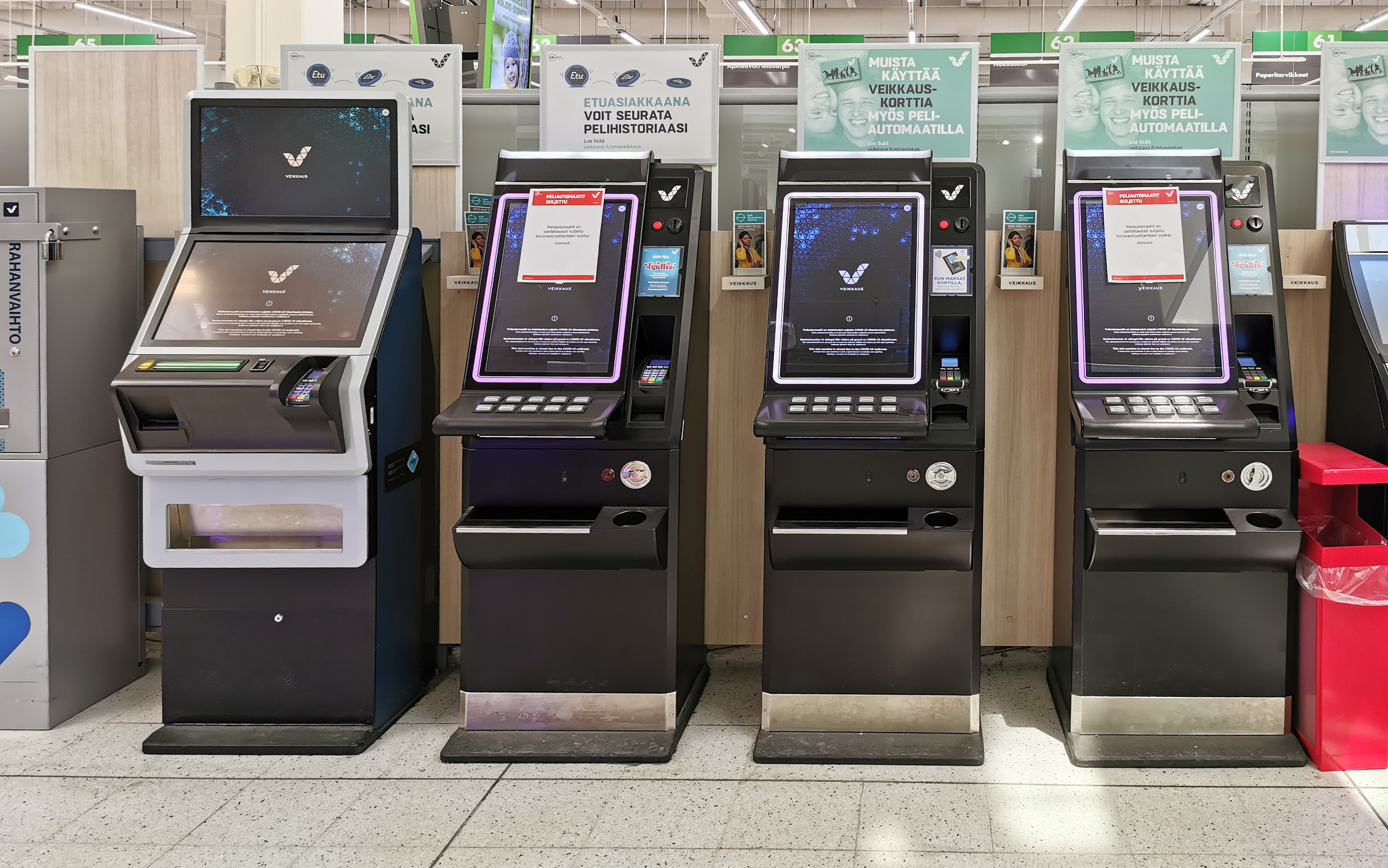
Veikkaus slot machines

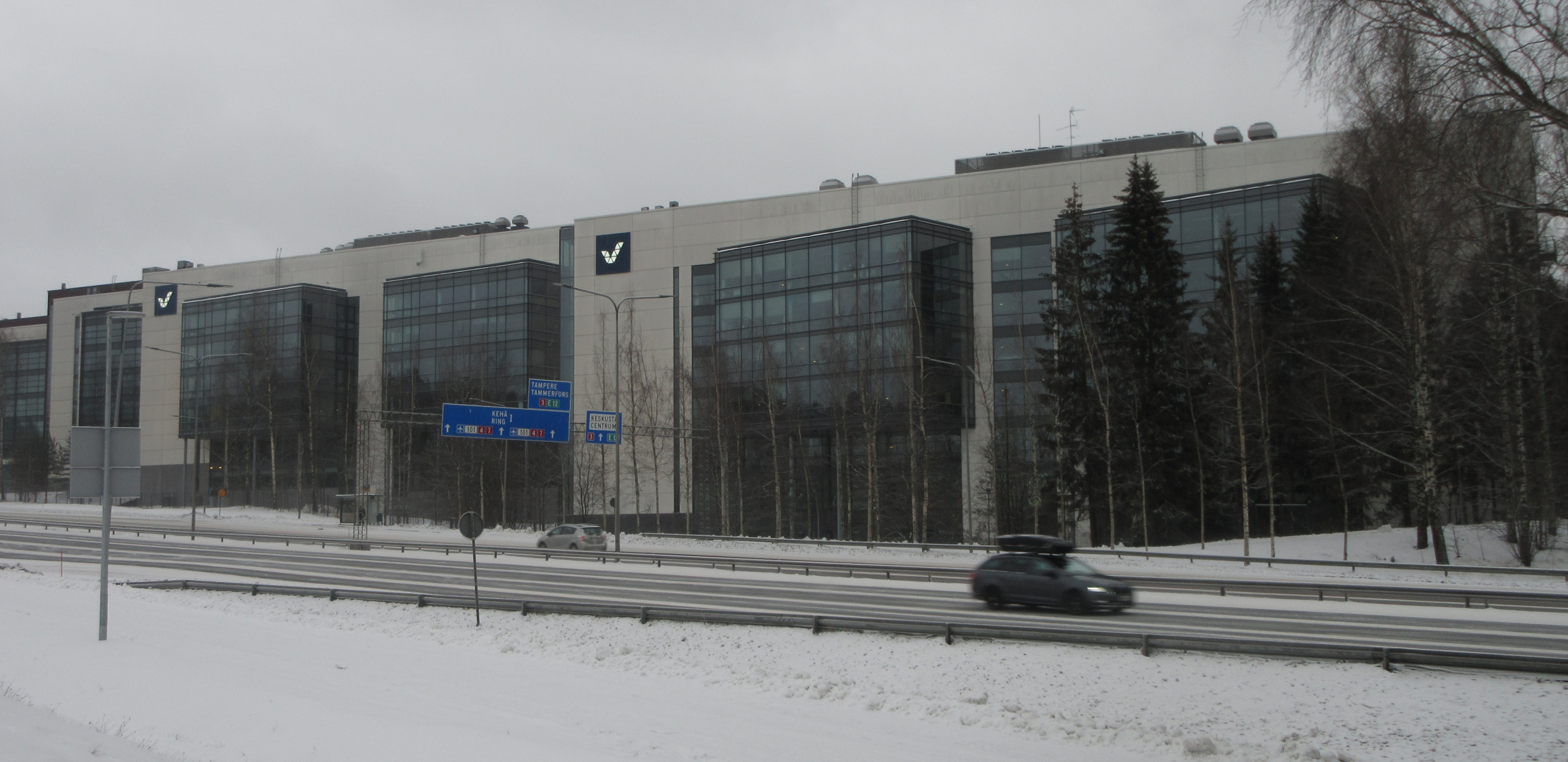
Veikkaus headquarters

== Profit distribution ==
The profit distribution of Veikkaus is determined in the law. The profit is distributed to be onwards distributed to ministry-specific beneficiaries as follows:

- 53% to the Ministry of Education and Culture for improving on sports and physical education, science, arts and youth work;
- 43% to the Ministry of Social Affairs and Health for improving on health and social welfare;
- 4% to the Ministry of Agriculture and Forestry for improving on horse racing.

== See also ==
- Casino Helsinki
- RAY
- Veikkaus (1940–2017)
