= Tourula =

- District of Jyväskylä
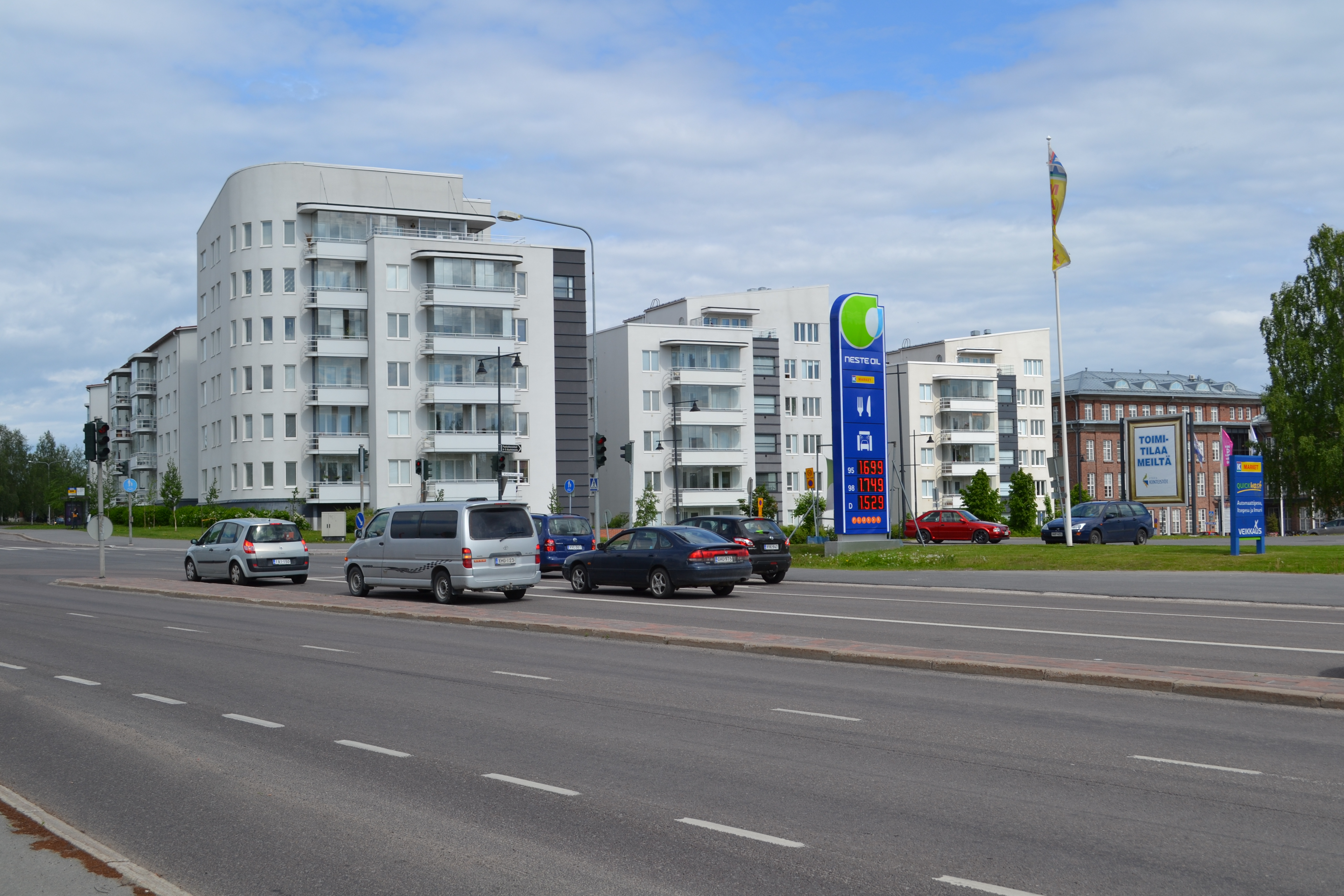
- Coordinates: 62°15′04″N 025°45′45″E
- Country: Finland
- Region: Central Finland
- Sub-region: Jyväskylä sub-region
- City: Jyväskylä
- Ward: Kantakaupunki
- Time zone: UTC+2 (EET)
  - Summer (DST): UTC+3 (EEST)
- Postal code: 40100 JYVÄSKYLÄ

Tourula is a district of Jyväskylä, Finland, and a part of the Kantakaupunki ward. It is located near downtown Jyväskylä and separated from it by the river Tourujoki. The district also includes the Kangas residential area.

The official district of Tourula borders Lohikoski in the north, Kangasvuori in the northeast, Halssila in the east, Lutakko in the south, Puistola in the west and Taulumäki in the northwest.

Tourula was a residential area for the working class, made of wooden single-family houses which were built in the 1910s and 1920s. The area was transferred from Jyväskylän maalaiskunta to Jyväskylä in 1941, and after that the wooden houses started to decay and they were torn down during the 1970s and 1980s. After that, the appearance of Tourula changed radically.

== History ==
The Tourula farm was first mentioned in a land register from 1539, when it was one of five farms in the village of Jyväskylä. The farm may have been named after an older farm called Touru, in either Hauho or Tammela. It was divided in 1560, after which Tourula came to refer to the new farm while the old farm was renamed Huikko after the surname of its new owners. Tourula was abandoned sometime before 1645, but became inhabited again in 1652. The ownership of Huikko also changed due to the Greater Wrath, after which it was inhabited by the Savonian Oittinen family at least until the end of the 18th century. The Tourula farm was split into two in 1772.

Huikko, Tourula and the farms separated from them formed a jakokunta (a division of an official village) of Jyväskylä. It comprised an area from the mouth of the Tourujoki to lake Palokkajärvi, from its easternmost bay to the ponds Kangaslampi and Vääräjärvi (in modern Huhtasuo), then to the Aittoniemi cape of Jyväsjärvi and from there back to the mouth of the Tourujoki. It also included an external area near Palokka near the lakes Palokkajärvi and Alvajärvi.

Tourula was part of Jyväskylän maalaiskunta until 1941, when it was transferred to the town of Jyväskylä.

=== Industrial history ===
Industrialization in Tourula began with the establishment of the Kangas paper mill in 1872. A rifle factory (Valtion Kivääritehdas) was established nearby in 1926.

The paper mill was first owned by Gustaf Adolf Serlachius and later by Metsä-Serla/M-real until September 2008, when it was sold to the South African Sappi Limited. The mill was closed down in 2010. Initially Sappi sold the area back to M-real in July 2010, but the town of Jyväskylä bought it soon after in November in order to establish a new district between downtown Jyväskylä and the commercial area of Seppälä. The first new residents arrived in 2016.

The rifle factory was established on lands bought from the paper mill. Its main building was designed by Urho Åberg. The initial machines of the factory were mainly acquired from the United States. During the Second World War, the production was partially relocated to the military depot in Seppälänkangas and the factories of Vaajakoski owned by SOK. After the war, small ironware such as door hinges were produced in the factory. In 1946, the rifle factory and the Rautpohja artillery factory (Rautpohjan tykkitehdas) were consolidated into Valtion Metallitehtaiden Yhtymä (VMT), which became Valmet in 1951. Production of Valmet tractors began in 1952, becoming the factory's new main product. The production of tractors was partially moved to Suolahti after Valmet purchased Mikro Oy's factory there in 1968. The rifle factory was purchased by Sako Oy in the 1980s, though their production was centered in Riihimäki. The production of firearms ended in the mid-1990s.

== Gallery ==
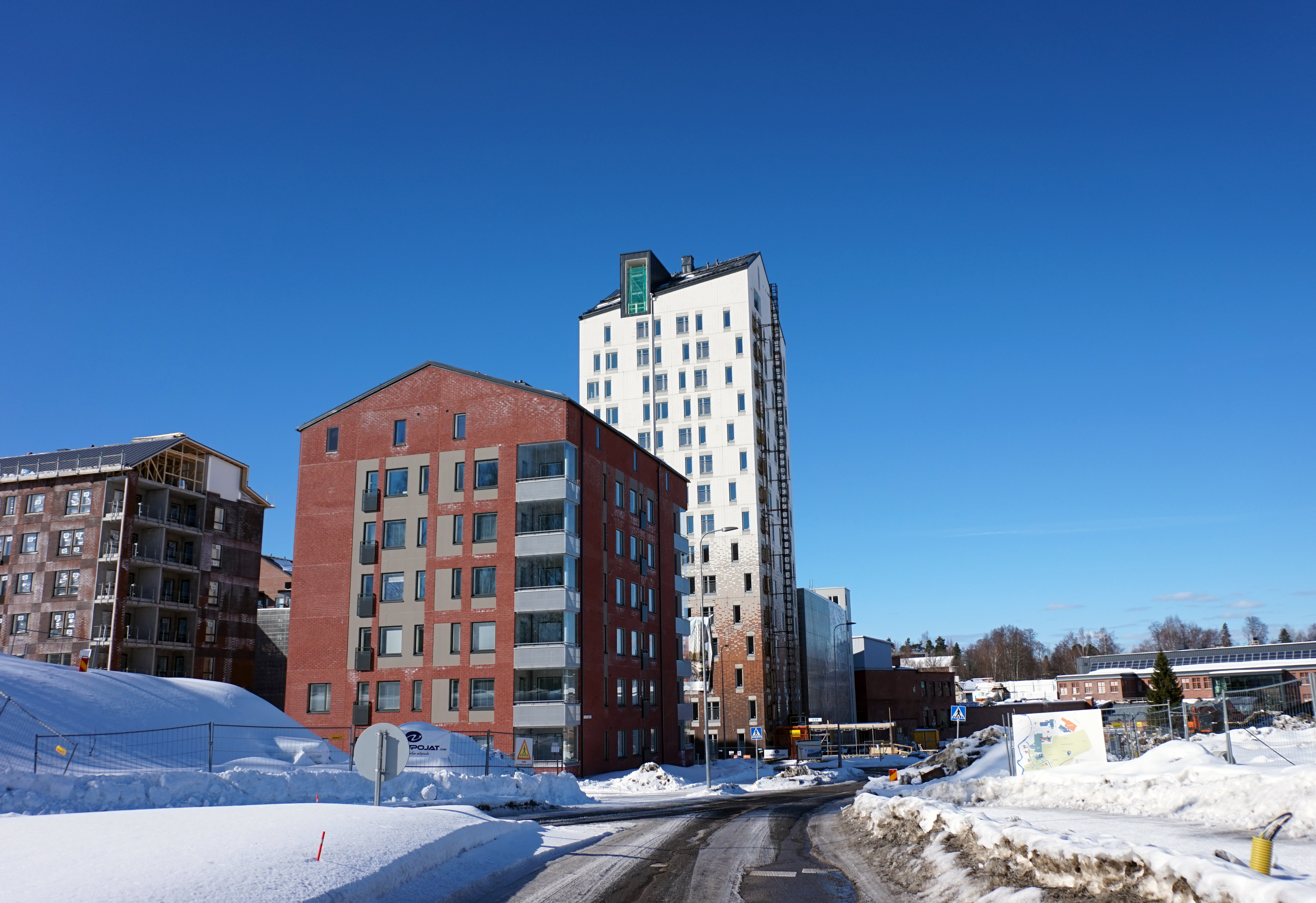
The Kangas area in Tourula.

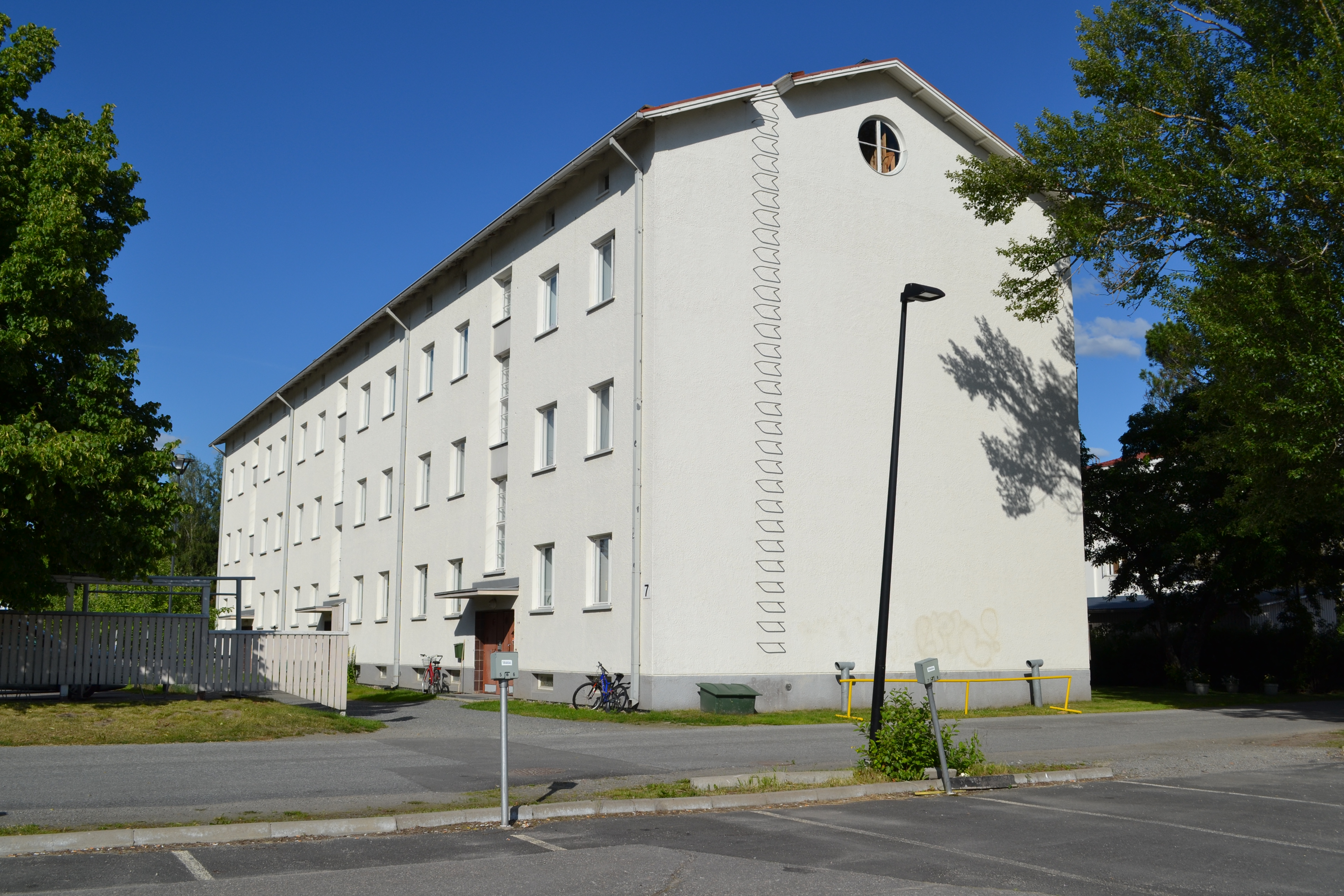
A functional apartment building in Tourula.

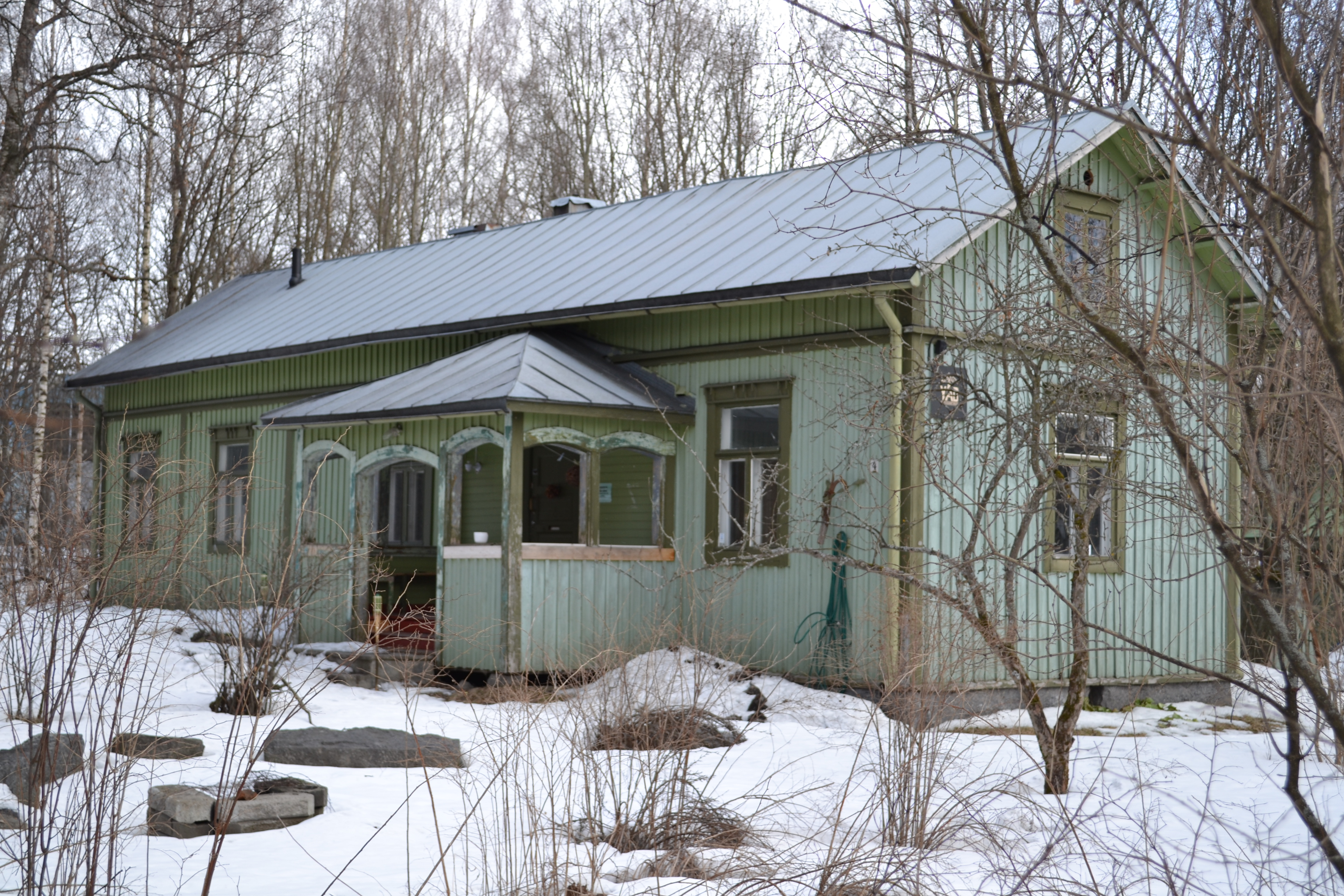
One of the last wooden houses of Tourula. It was torn down in 2015.

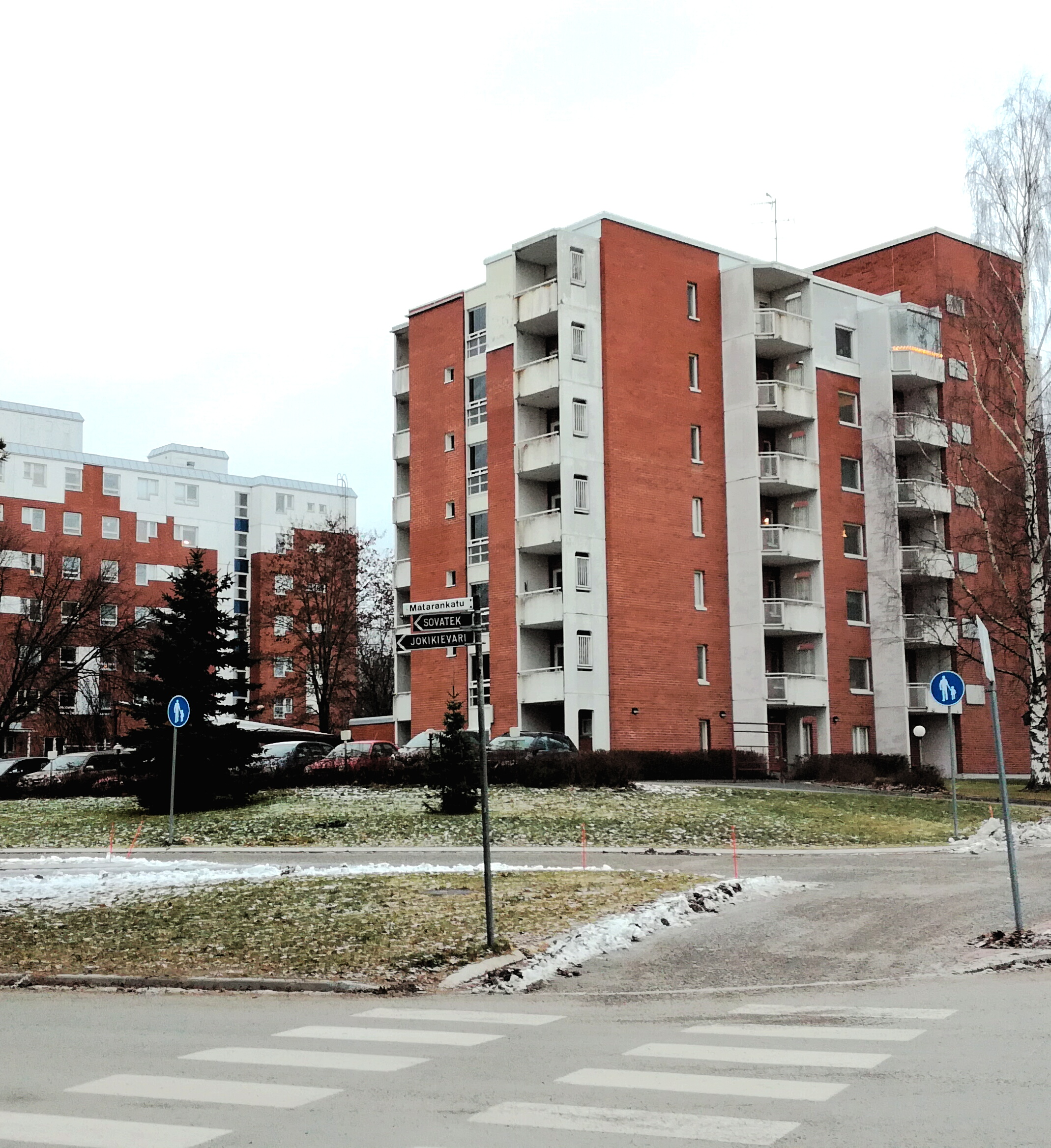
Apartment buildings in Tourula.
