= Jyväsjärvi =

Lake in Jyväskylä, Finland

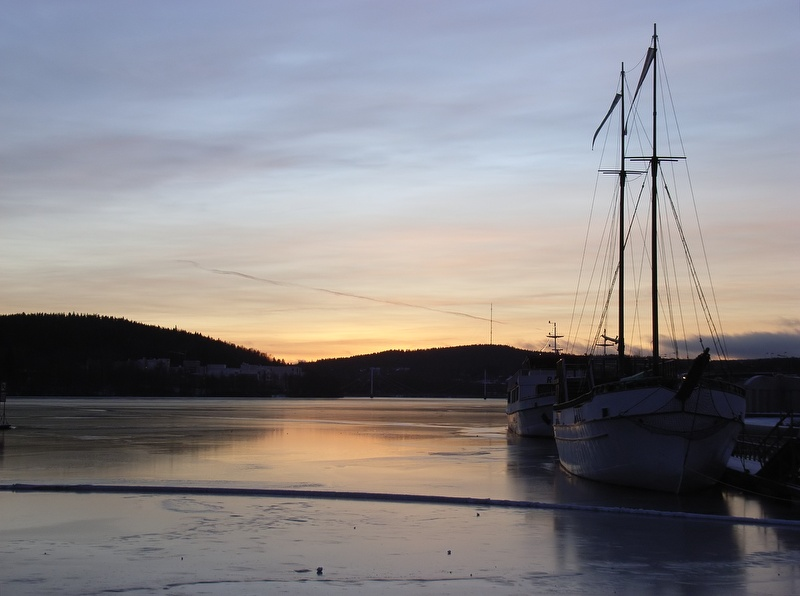
- Jyväsjärvi at sunset
- Interactive map of Jyväsjärvi
- Location: Jyväskylä
- Coordinates: 62.24°N 25.77°E
- Primary outflows: Äijälänsalmi
- Basin countries: Finland
- Surface area: 3.3 km^{2} (1.3 sq mi)
- Average depth: 7 m (23 ft)
- Max. depth: 25 m (82 ft)
- Surface elevation: 78.3 m (257 ft)
- Islands: 1

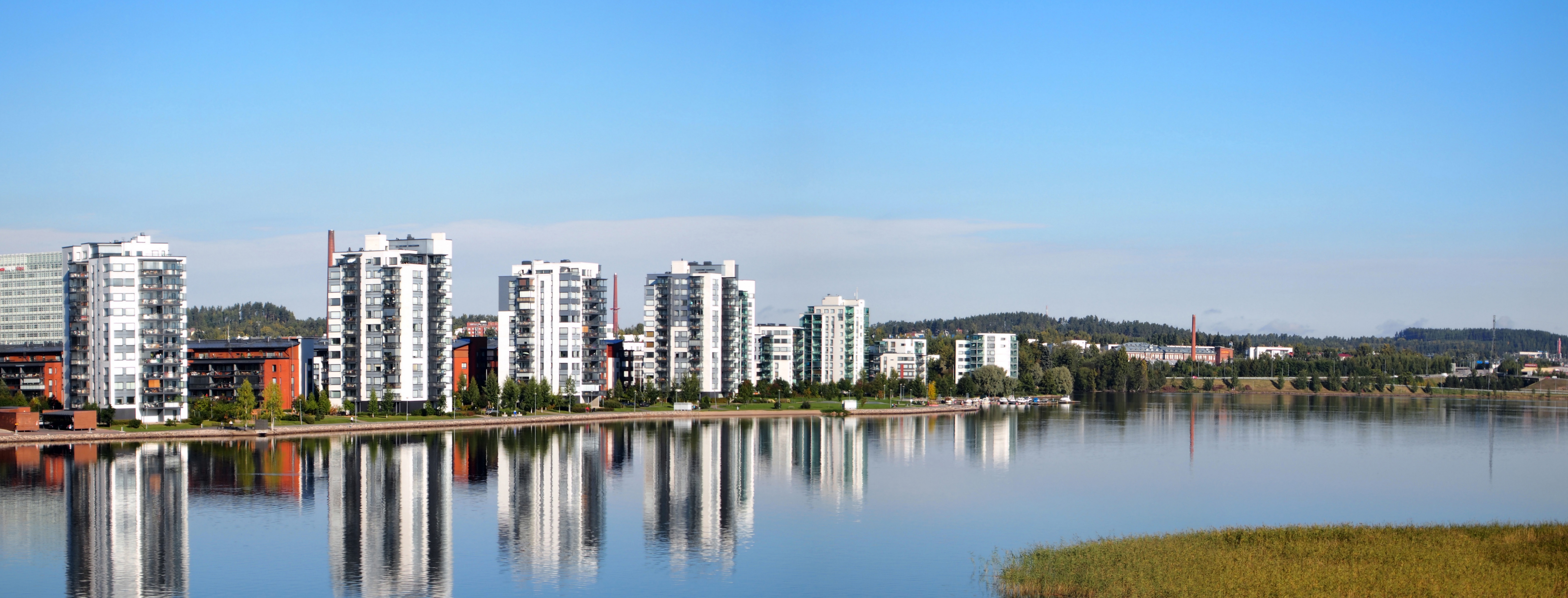
Lutakko neighbourhood on the shores of Jyväsjärvi

Jyväsjärvi (Finnish pronunciation: [ˈjyʋæsˌjærʋi]) is a lake situated in the centre of Jyväskylä in Finland. The lake is sometimes seen as a part of the Päijänne, as both lakes are on the same level (78.3 m (257 ft) from sea level) and are connected by the Äijälänsalmi strait. (Note: The Finnish Environment Institute (SYKE) counts Jyväsjärvi as part of "Päijänne (pohj. N60+78.10)" (northern Päijänne).)

Parts of Jyväsjärvi have been filled many times to gain more land for the growing city of Jyväskylä. Mattilanniemi and Ylistö, two campuses of the University of Jyväskylä, are situated on the western shores of the lake. Two bridges cross the lake, connecting Ylistönrinne and Kuokkala to the city centre. The harbour of Jyväskylä is located in Lutakko, near the Kuokkala bridge.

During winter, a three-kilometre (1.9 mi) long ice skating track is created on the surface of the lake. There is also a path, popular among pedestrians, cyclists, joggers and rollerbladers, going around the lake.

== Naming and etymology ==
The name of Jyväsjärvi is connected to that of Jyväskylä itself, as well as to that of Jyväsjoki, a historical name for a watercourse beginning from the lake Onkilampi in Uurainen and ending at the Päijänne. The earliest known mentions of the name Jyväsjärvi are from the late 17th century, while Jyväsjoki was first attested in 1506 (iywesioki), though referring to the settlement that later became known as Jyväskylä, not the watercourse itself. Despite this, it is unclear if the lake is named after the watercourse or vice versa. While rivers are more commonly named after lakes than lakes are after rivers, this would require Jyväsjoki to have originally been only the name of the lake's outlet Äijälänjoki, modern Äijälänsalmi.

According to Viljo Nissilä, the name contains the word jyvänen (genitive jyväsen) meaning "(single) grain", as a reference to fertile swiddens, or rotational farming sites, around the lake before the area was permanently inhabited. Alternatively, Jyvänen may have been a nickname of a farmer who owned hunting grounds in the area before it was settled. Such a nickname could still refer to fertile land, perhaps in Saarioinen (southern Sääksmäki), which was historically its own administrative division (hallintopitäjä) that included the then-village of Jyväskylä, from where the names beginning with jyväs- would have spread to this area.

== Geography ==
Jyväsjärvi is surrounded by urban area on all sides. Residential areas around the lake include Lutakko, Äijälä and the Ainola, Ainolanranta and Suuruspää areas of Kuokkala. Downtown Jyväskylä, Tourula and Halssila are separated from the lake by highways and railroads.

Jyväsjärvi is located in the Ristiselkä (Ristinselkä) catchment area, which is part of the Päijänne basin and the Kymijoki main catchment area. The main inflow of the lake is the river Tourujoki, which begins from the Palokkajärvi. The river's basin covers an area of 334 square kilometres (129 sq mi). Another inflow is the Köyhänoja, beginning from the Köhniönjärvi, with a basin covering 19 square kilometres (7.3 sq mi) of land. There is also an unnamed 2.6-kilometre (1.6 mi) long stream in western Halssila that discharges into the northern part of the lake.

Jyväsjärvi itself discharges into the Päijänne via the narrow, 700-metre (2,300 ft) long Äijälänsalmi strait. It was formerly a river called Äijälänjoki until it was dredged for water traffic between 1839 and 1840, becoming a strait and acquiring its modern name.

== Water quality ==
Starting in the early 20th century, wastewater from the city was discharged into the Jyväsjärvi without treatment. While there were plans to build a treatment plant in Lutakko during the 1930s, it was never built, while the amount of wastewater kept increasing as the city grew. A significant polluter was the Kangas paper mill, from where as much as 5,000 kg (11,000 lb) of sulfuric acid may have entered the lake via the Tourujoki during a day in the 1960s. By the 1970s, oxygen consumption had increased to a point where the lake was nearly devoid of oxygen during winters.

In 1967, the city of Jyväskylä and Jyväskylän maalaiskunta agreed to build a shared wastewater treatment plant, which was eventually built in 1974. By 1977, all of the town's wastewater was treated in the plant. Oxygen was first artificially added into the Jyväsjärvi in 1979, continuing until 2013. The closure of the Kangas paper mill in 2010 also allowed the lake to recover more quickly. By the 21st century, the lake has largely recovered and the quality of its water is monitored by the University of Jyväskylä. The lake is still rather eutrophic and occasionally somewhat lacking in oxygen.

== Fishing ==
Fishing in the Jyväsjärvi has been deemed safe since 1997. Fish found in the lake include perch, pike, ruffe, zander, smelt, common bream, burbot, white bream, bleak, common whitefish, common rudd, roach and brown trout; all found via exploratory net fishing between 2001 and 2013. Because the lake is directly connected to the Päijänne, the actual number of species is likely higher. There were 59 households who had fished on the lake in 2015 using rods, nets or traps, with the most commonly caught fish being perch (caught by 91% of fishers), pike (55%) and zander (36%).
