= Keskusta, Jyväskylä =

Keskusta
- Ward of Jyväskylä
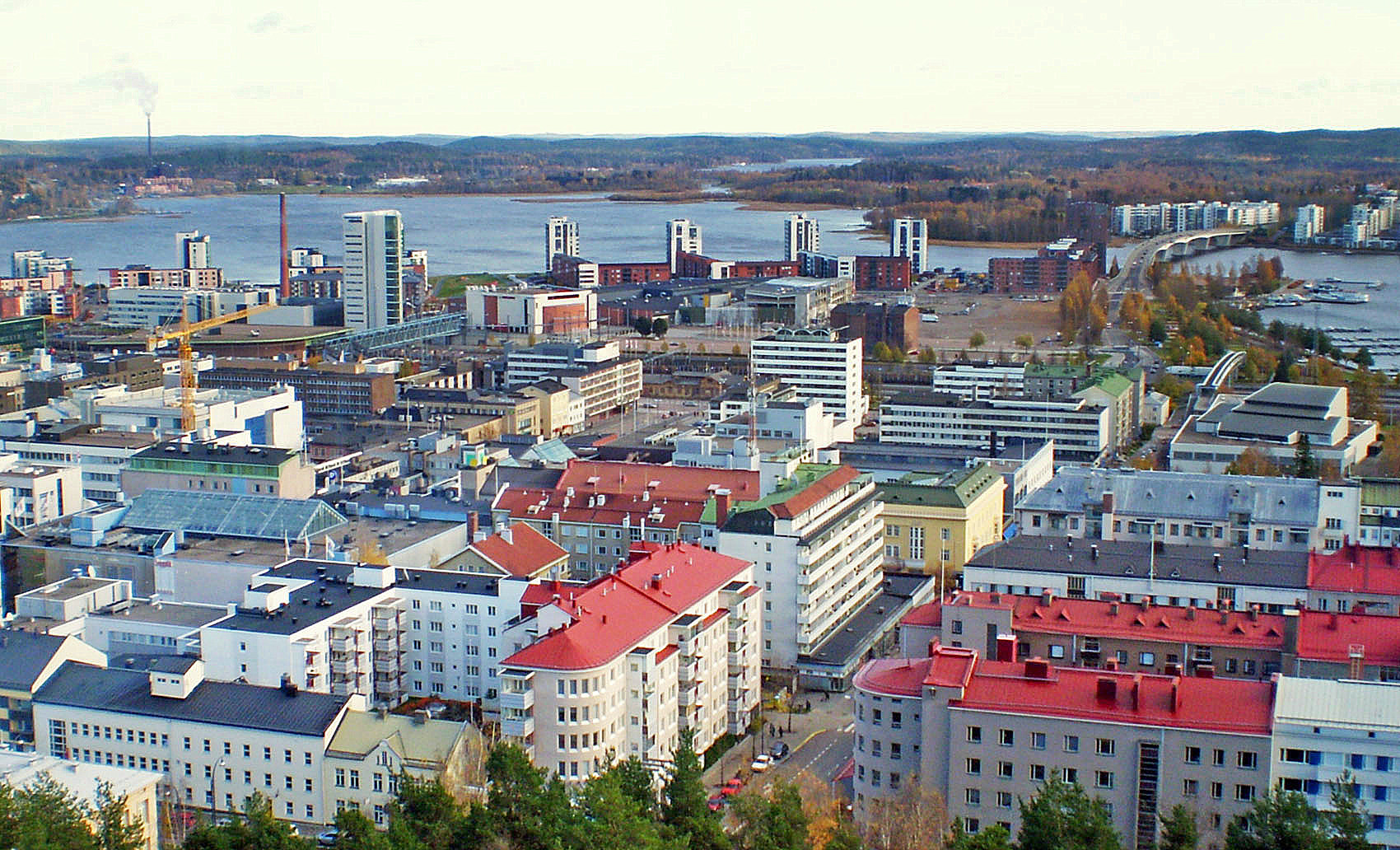
- City Centre seen from Harju
- Coordinates: 62.2411°N 25.7462°E
- Country: Finland
- Province: Western Finland
- Region: Central Finland
- Sub-region: Jyväskylä sub-region
- City: Jyväskylä
- Ward: Kantakaupunki

Area
  - Total: 0.6 km^{2} (0.23 sq mi)

Population (2010)
  - Total: 5,095
- Time zone: UTC+2 (EET)
  - Summer (DST): UTC+3 (EEST)
- Postal code: 40100 JYVÄSKYLÄ

Keskusta is a district of Jyväskylä, Finland formed by approximately 20 blocks in the city centre. The district borders Puistola, Harju and the town's market square in the north, as well as Lutakko, lake Jyväsjärvi and the Seminaarinmäki campus of the University of Jyväskylä in the south.

== Gallery ==
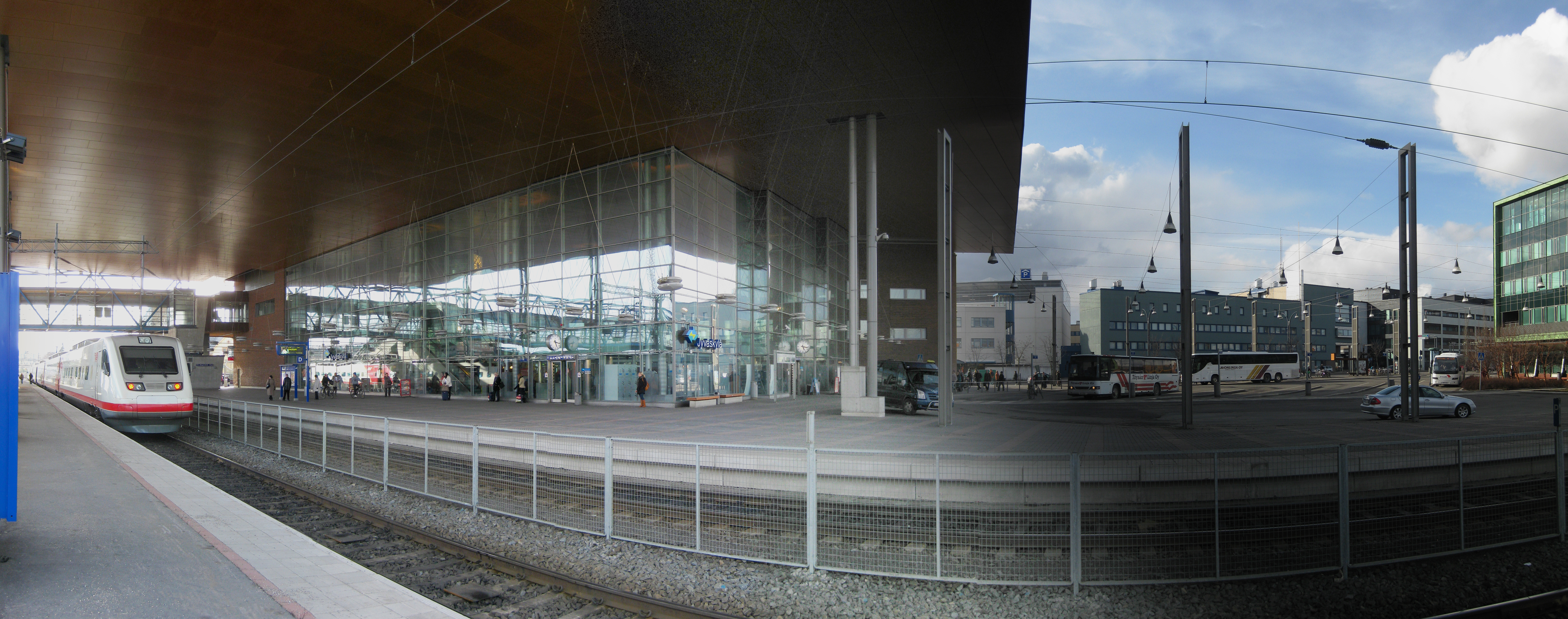
Matkakeskus

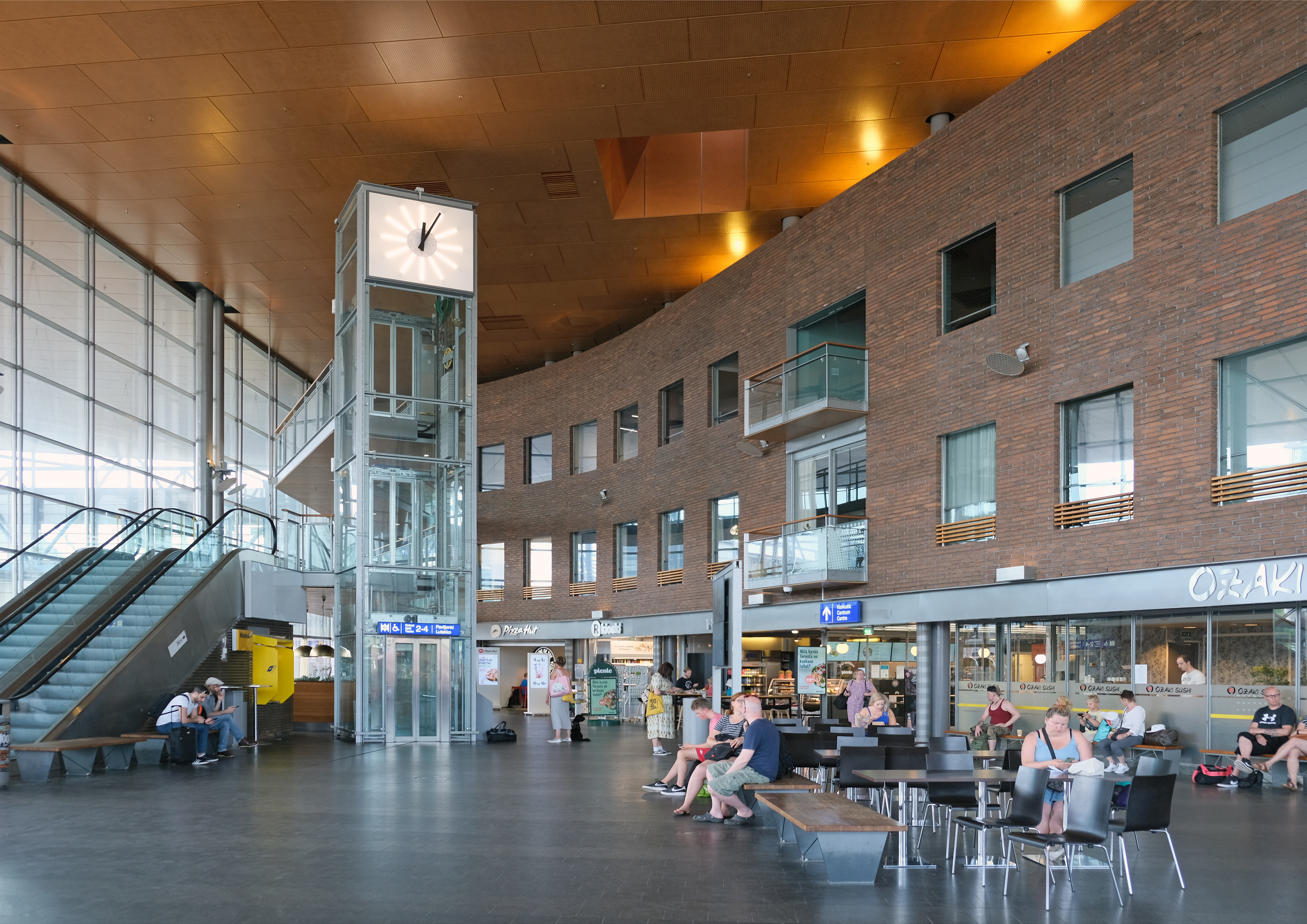
Railway Station Interior

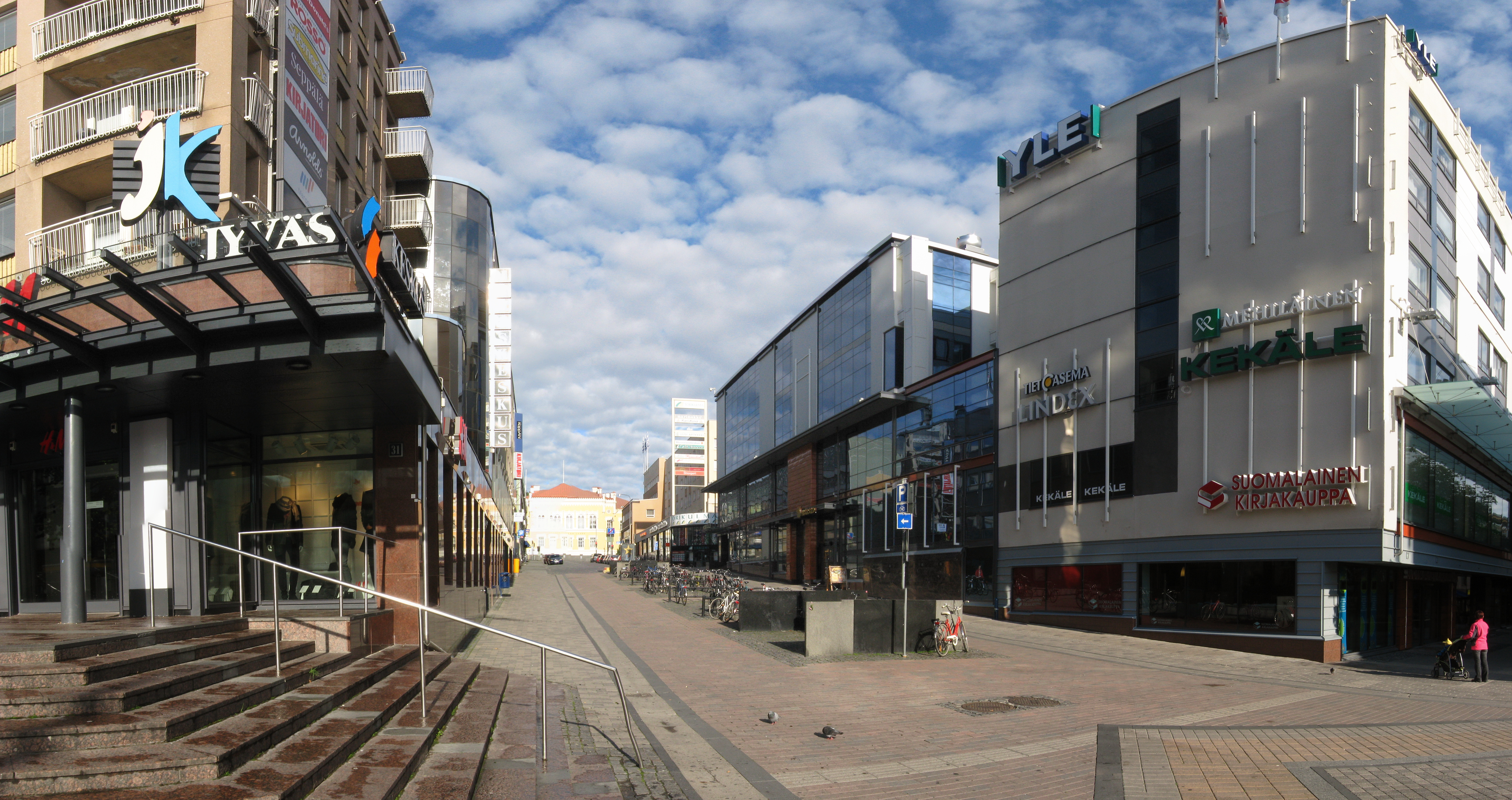
Asemakatu

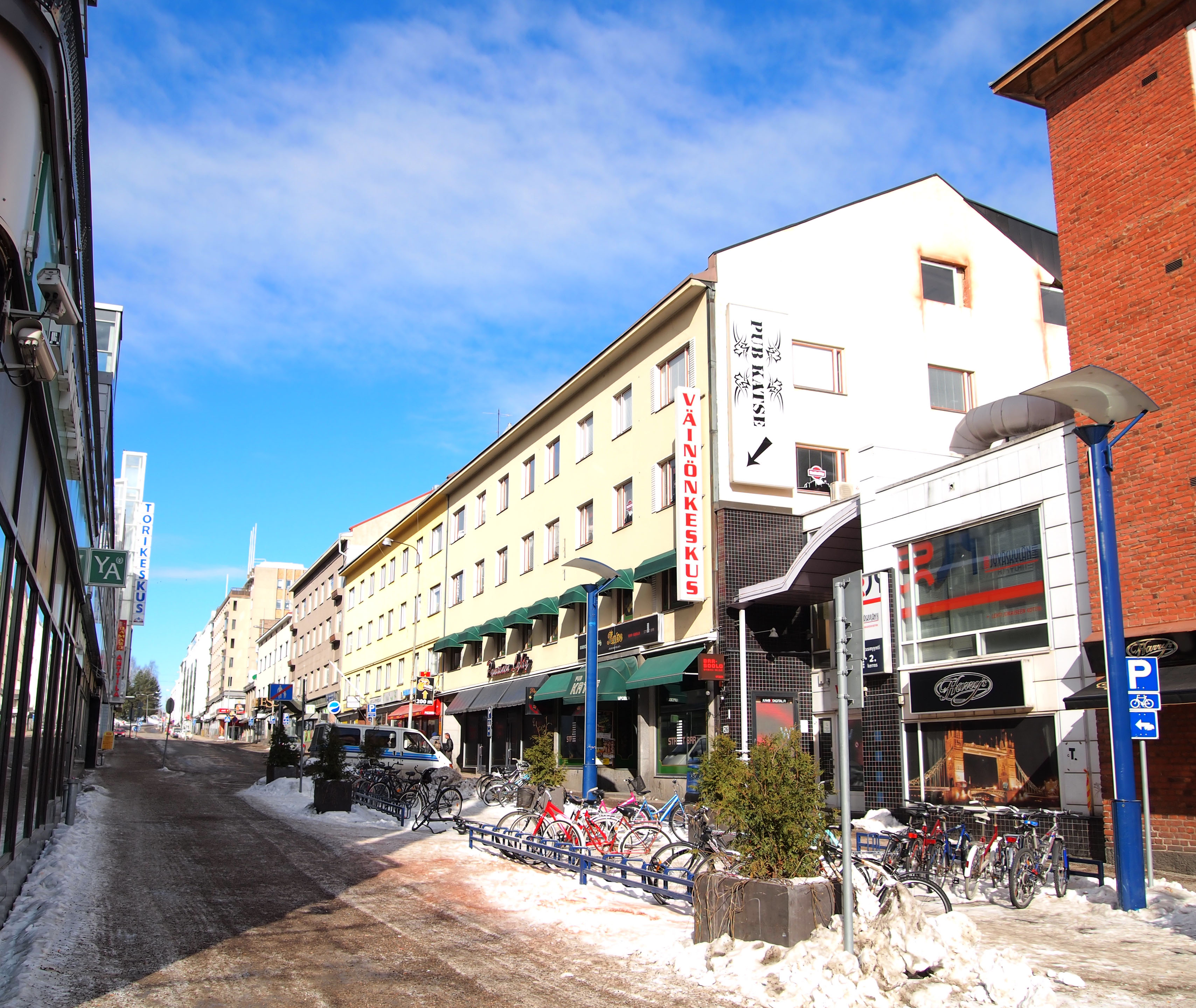
Väinönkatu

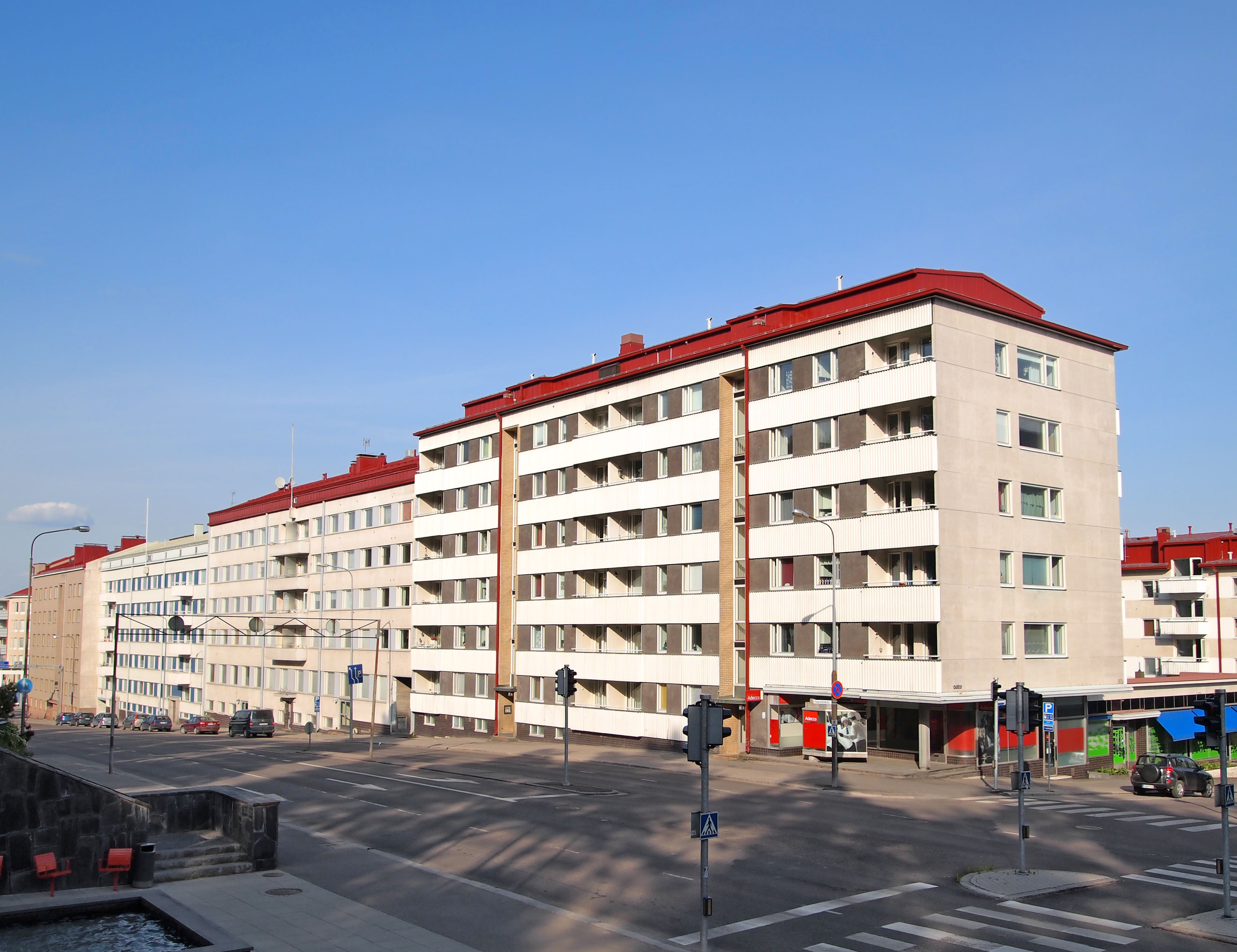
Yliopistonkatu

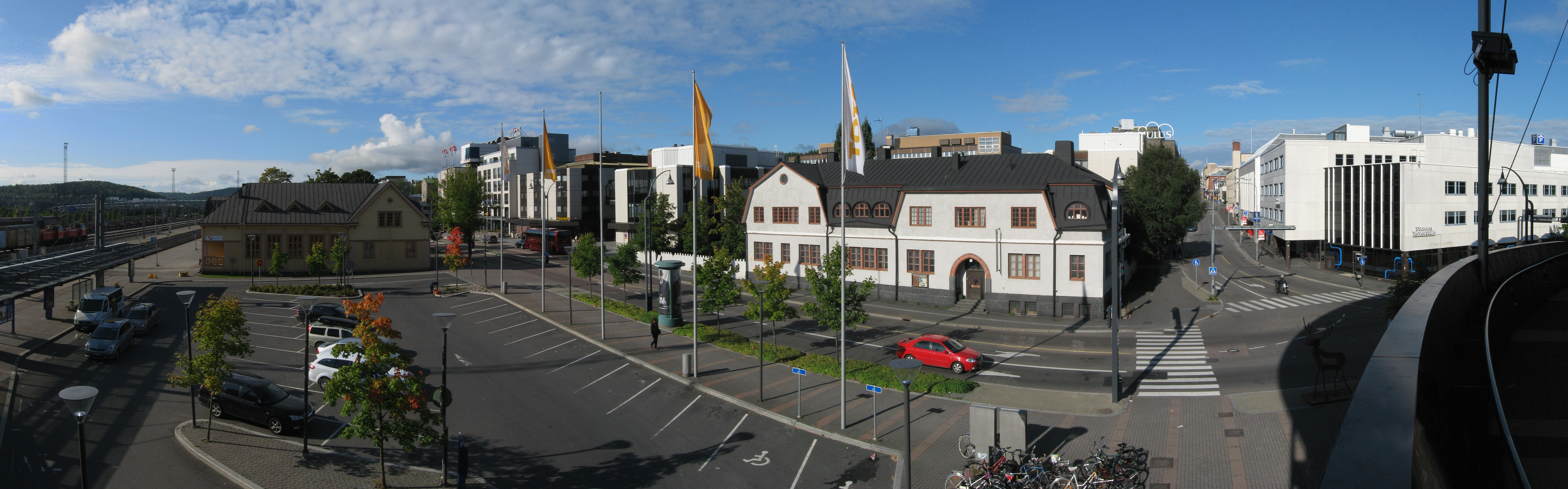
Old Halonen Brothers' reed organ factory and old railway station

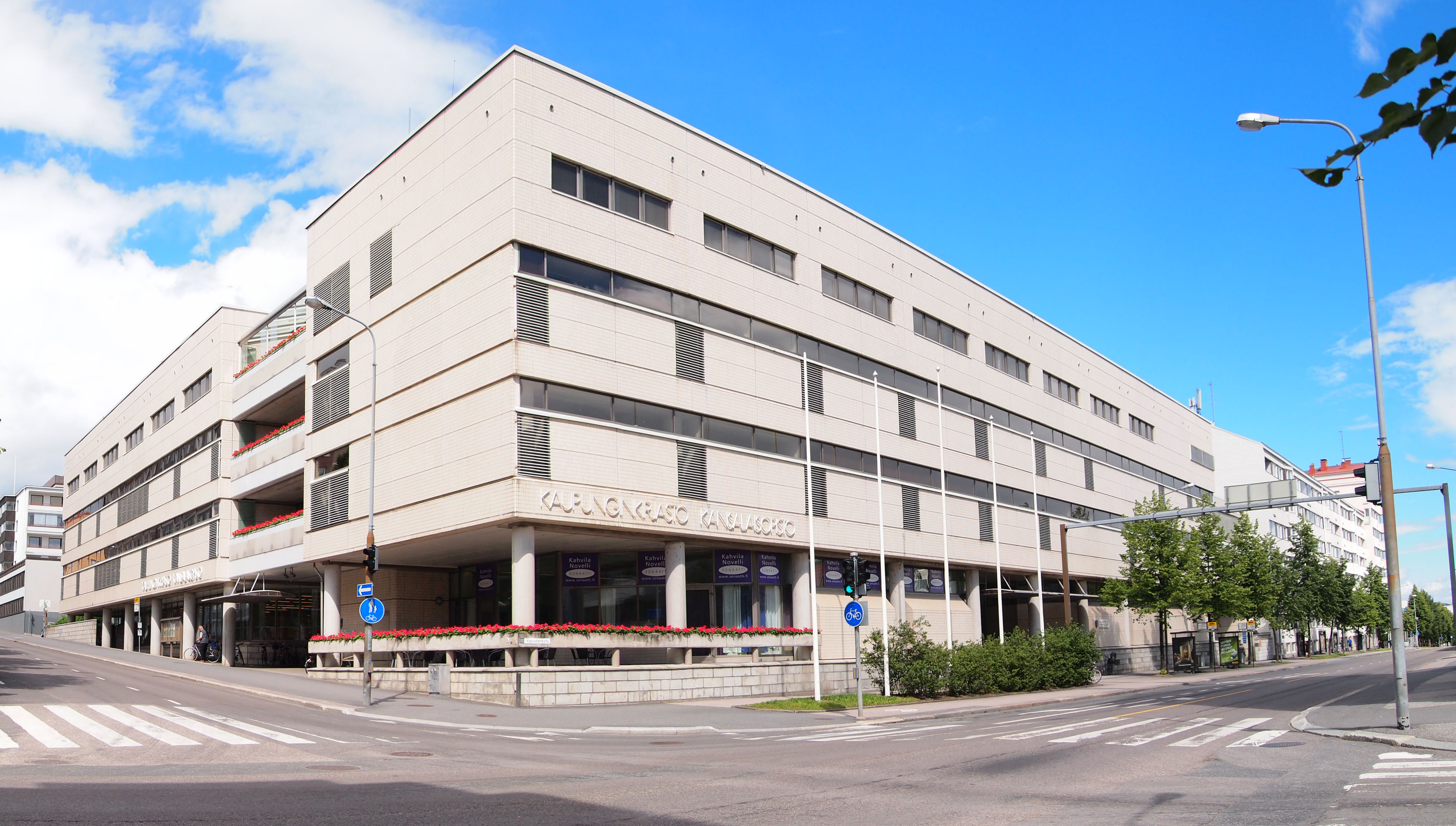
City Library

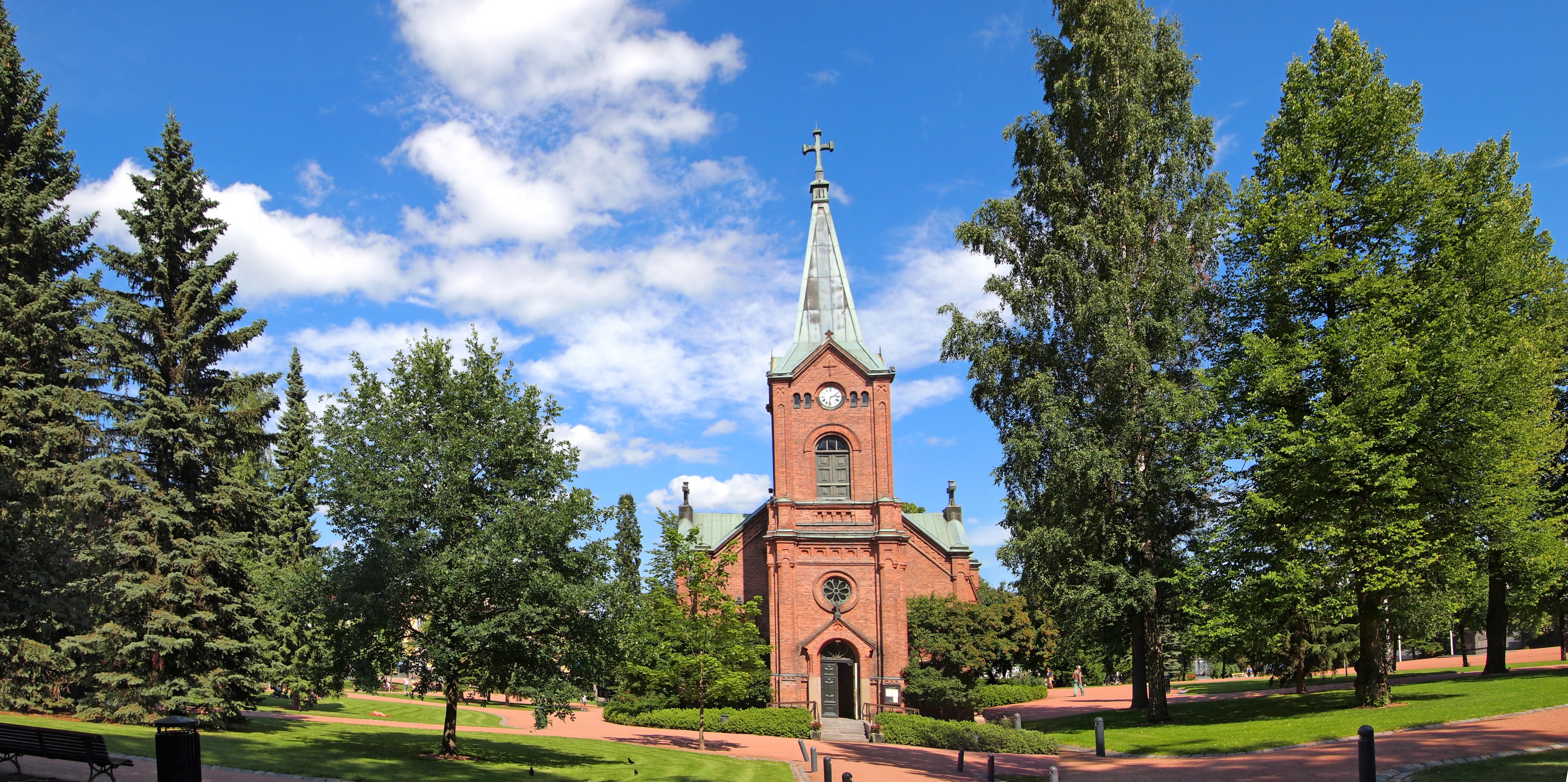
Jyväskylä City Church and Church Park

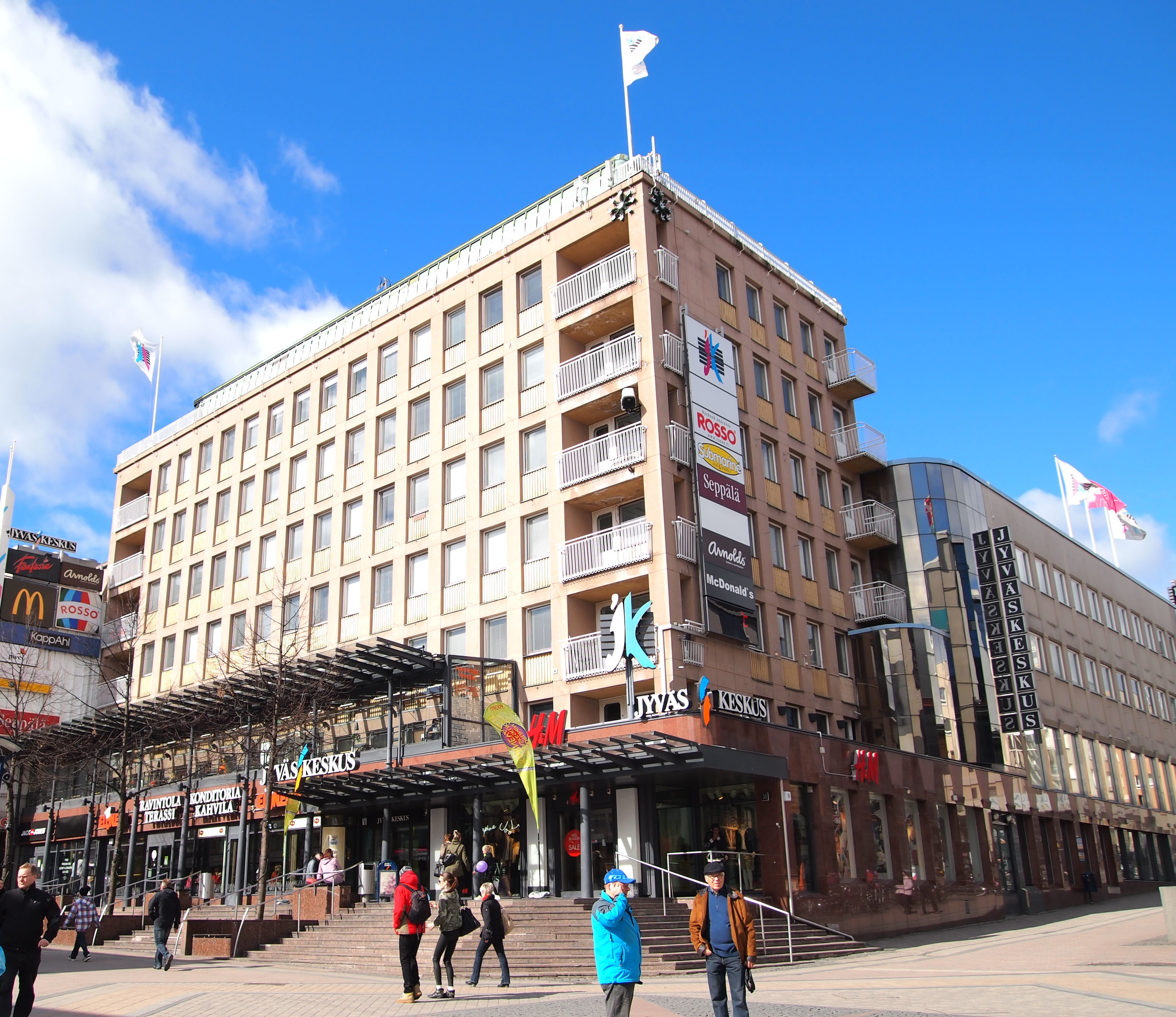
Jyväskeskus

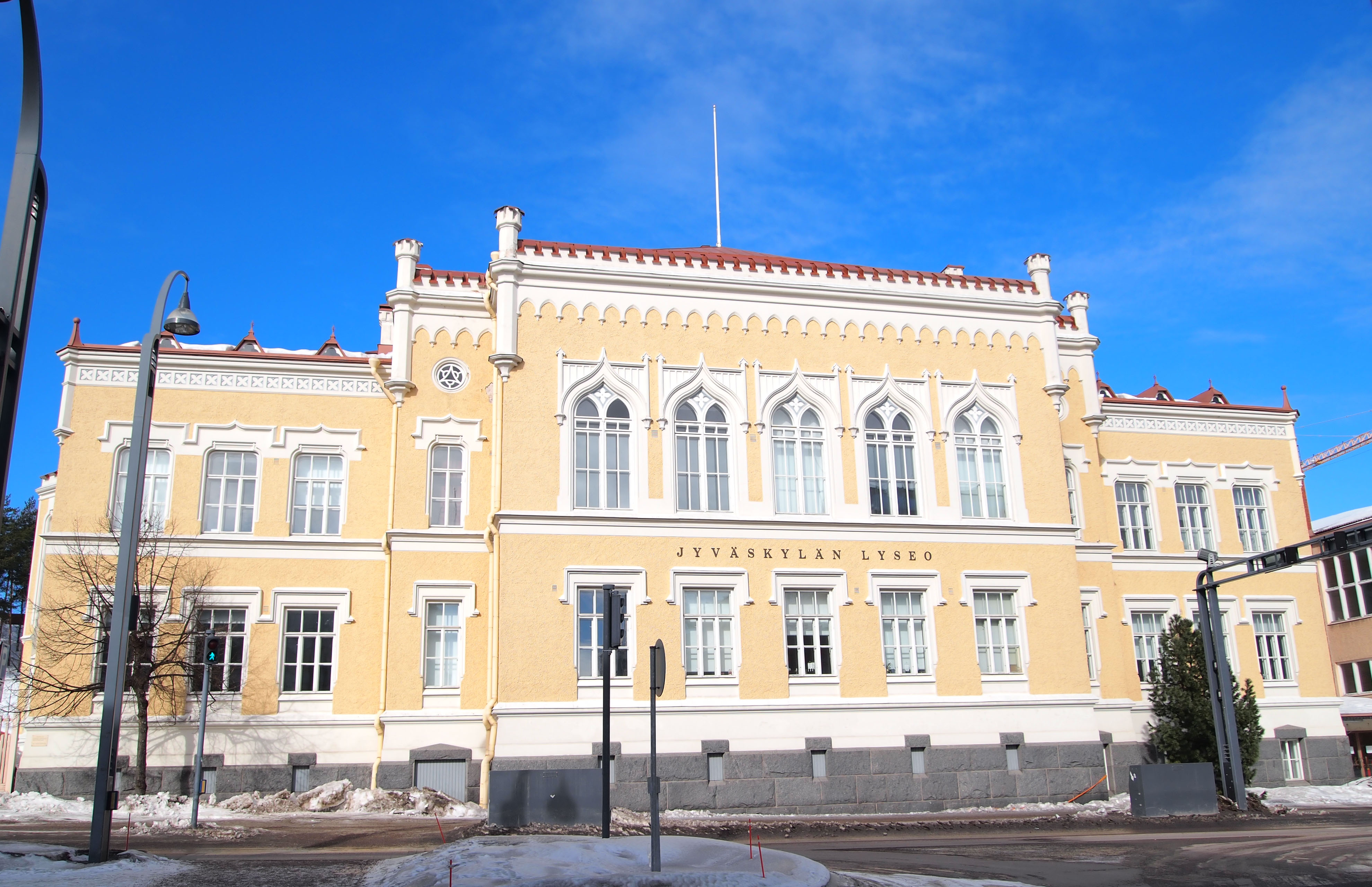
Jyväskylä Lyseo Upper Secondary School

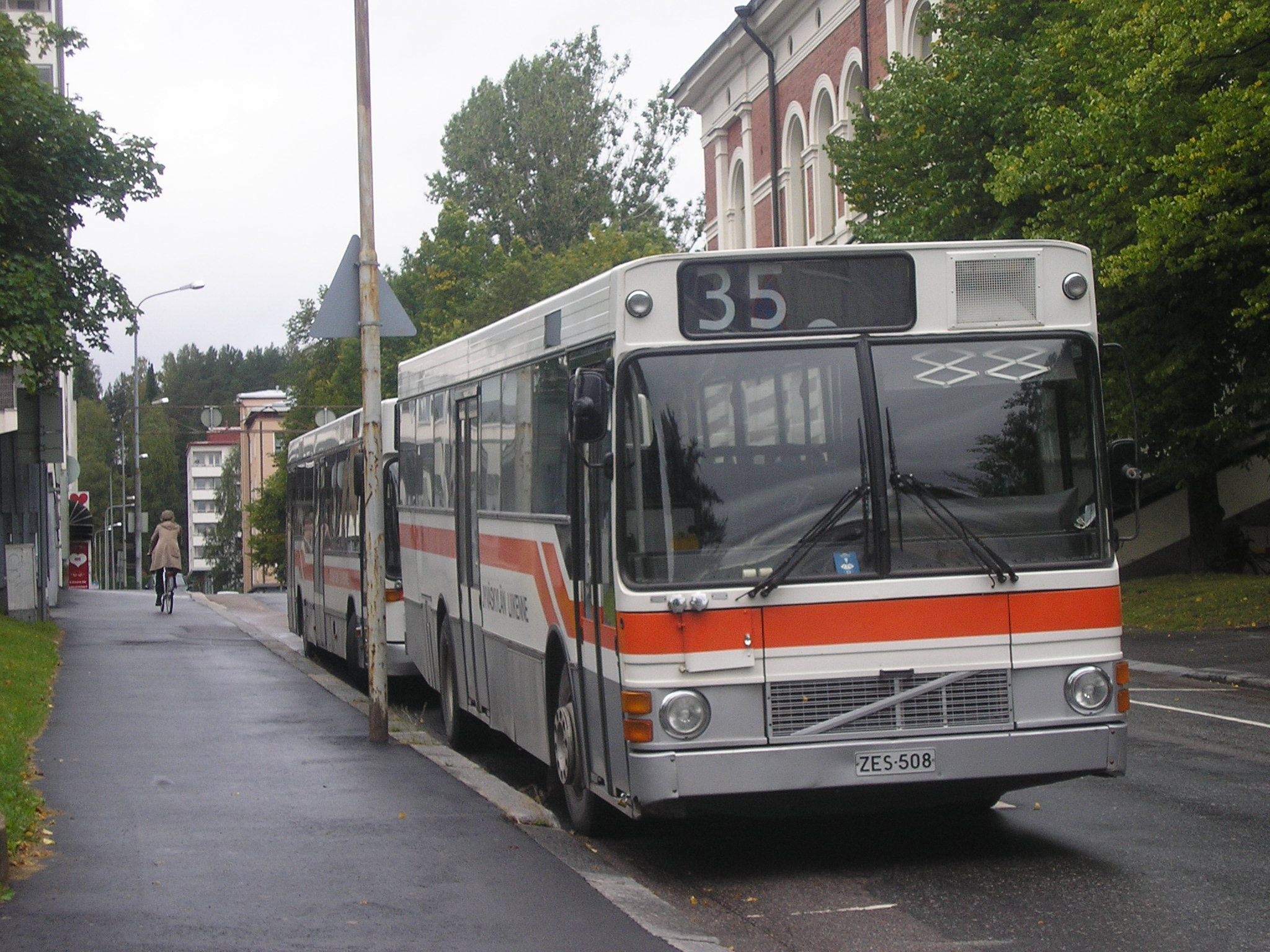
Buses in front of the City Hall

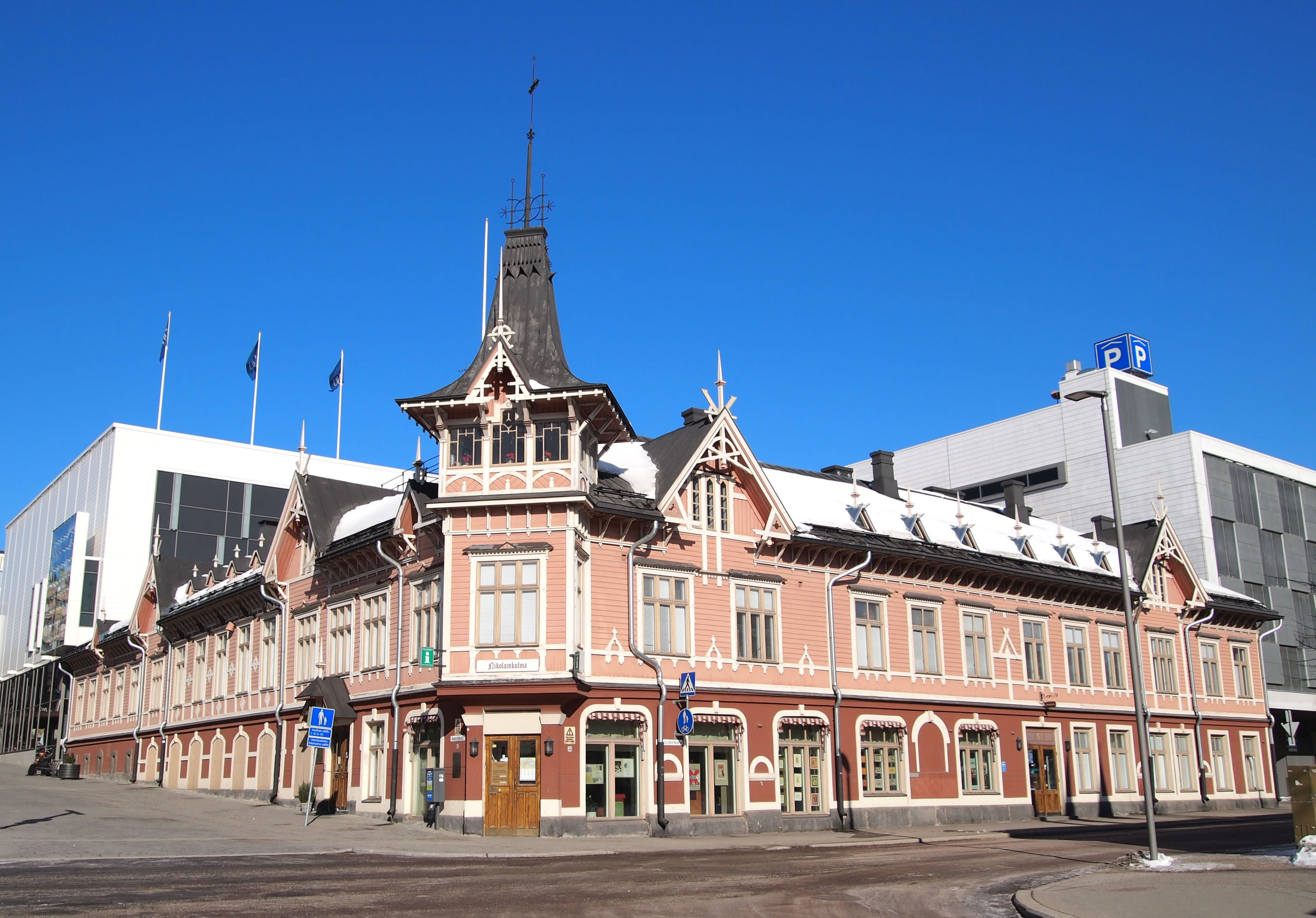
Nikolainkulma

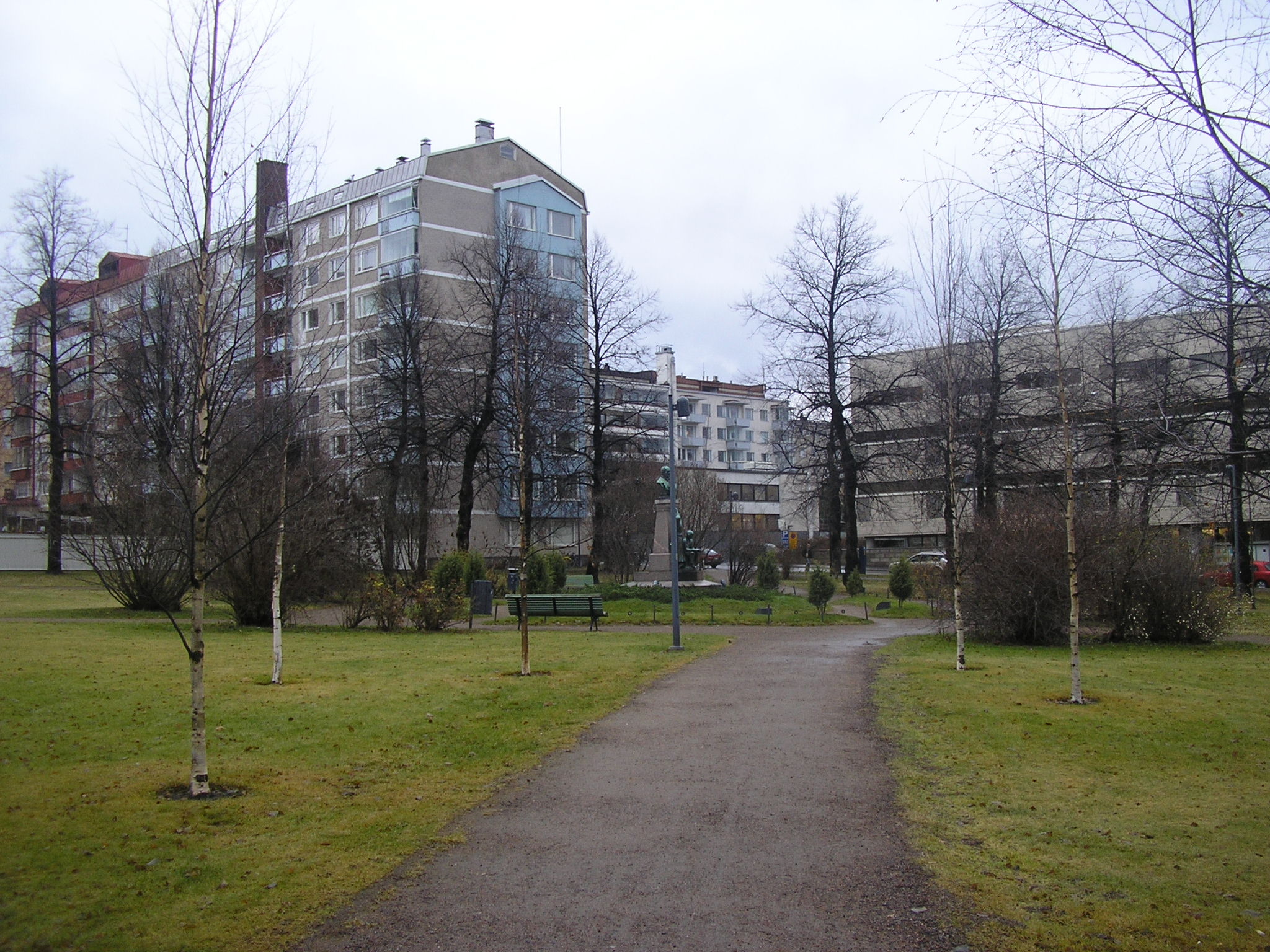
Park Cygnaeuksenpuisto

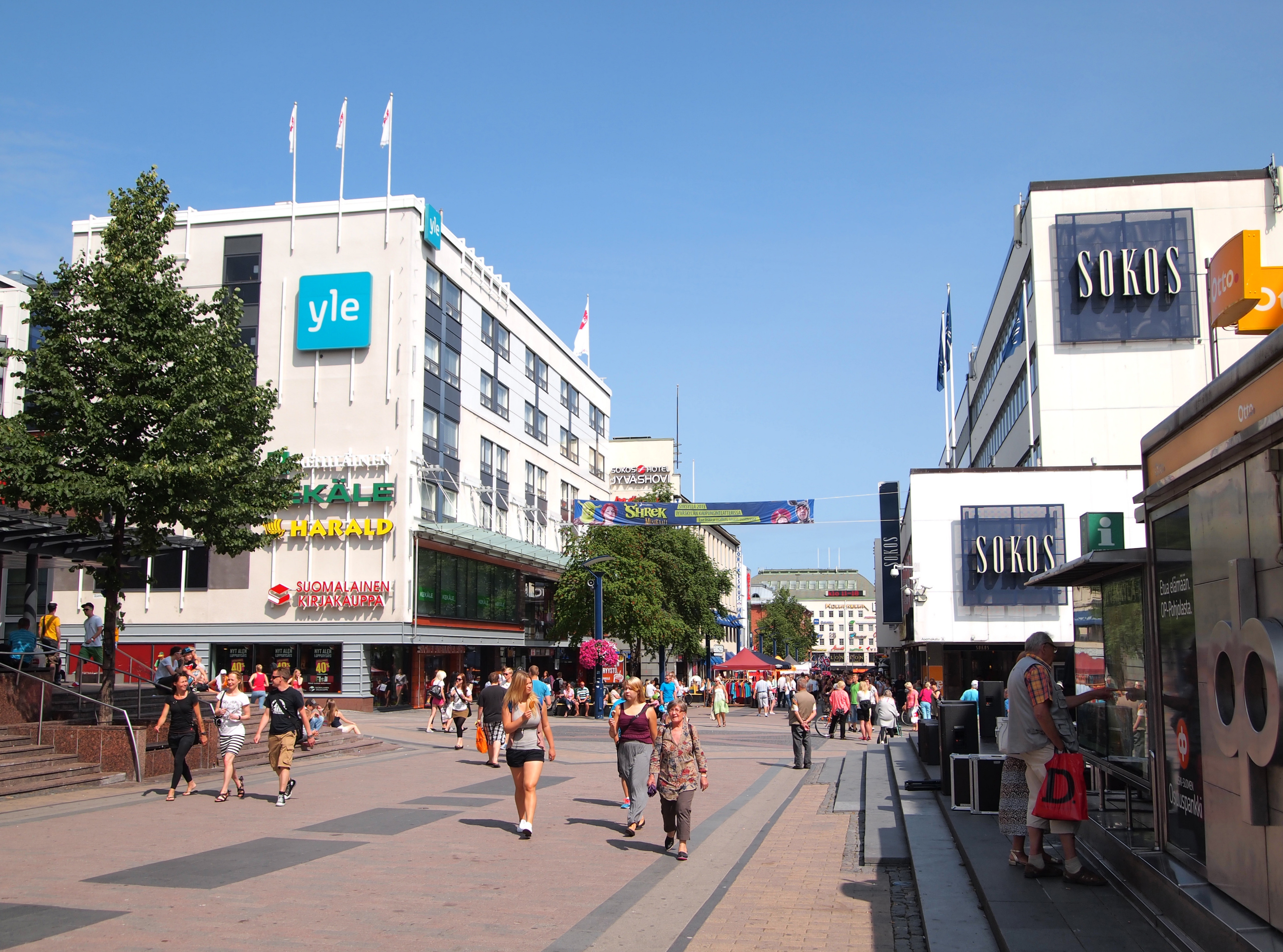
Kauppakatu
