= Lohikoski =

- District of Jyväskylä
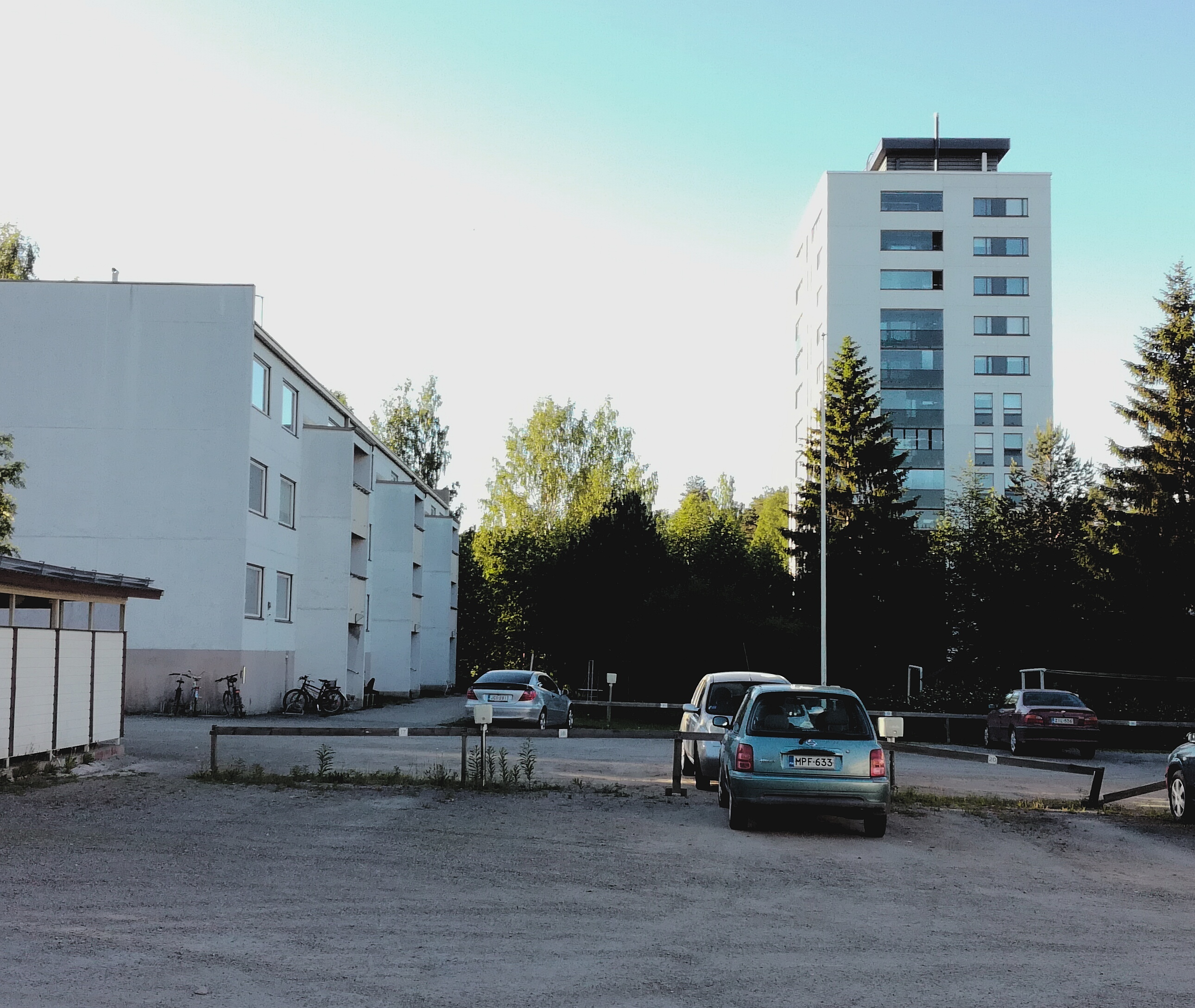
- An apartment building built in the 1960s and a tower block built in 2012.
- Interactive map of Lohikoski
- Coordinates: 62.2665°N 25.7599°E
- Country: Finland
- Province: Western Finland
- Region: Central Finland
- Sub-region: Jyväskylä sub-region
- City: Jyväskylä
- Ward: Lohikoski-Seppälänkangas

Population (2020)
  - Total: 3,460
- Time zone: UTC+2 (EET)
  - Summer (DST): UTC+3 (EEST)

Lohikoski is a district of Jyväskylä, Finland and a part of the Lohikoski-Seppälänkangas ward. Lahjaharju, Holsti, Kyyhkysenmäki and Paloniemi are subareas of Lohikoski. The district has several services such as a school, a library and a convenience store. Also the Seppälä fire station and the Lahjaharju graveyard are located in the area.

== Gallery ==
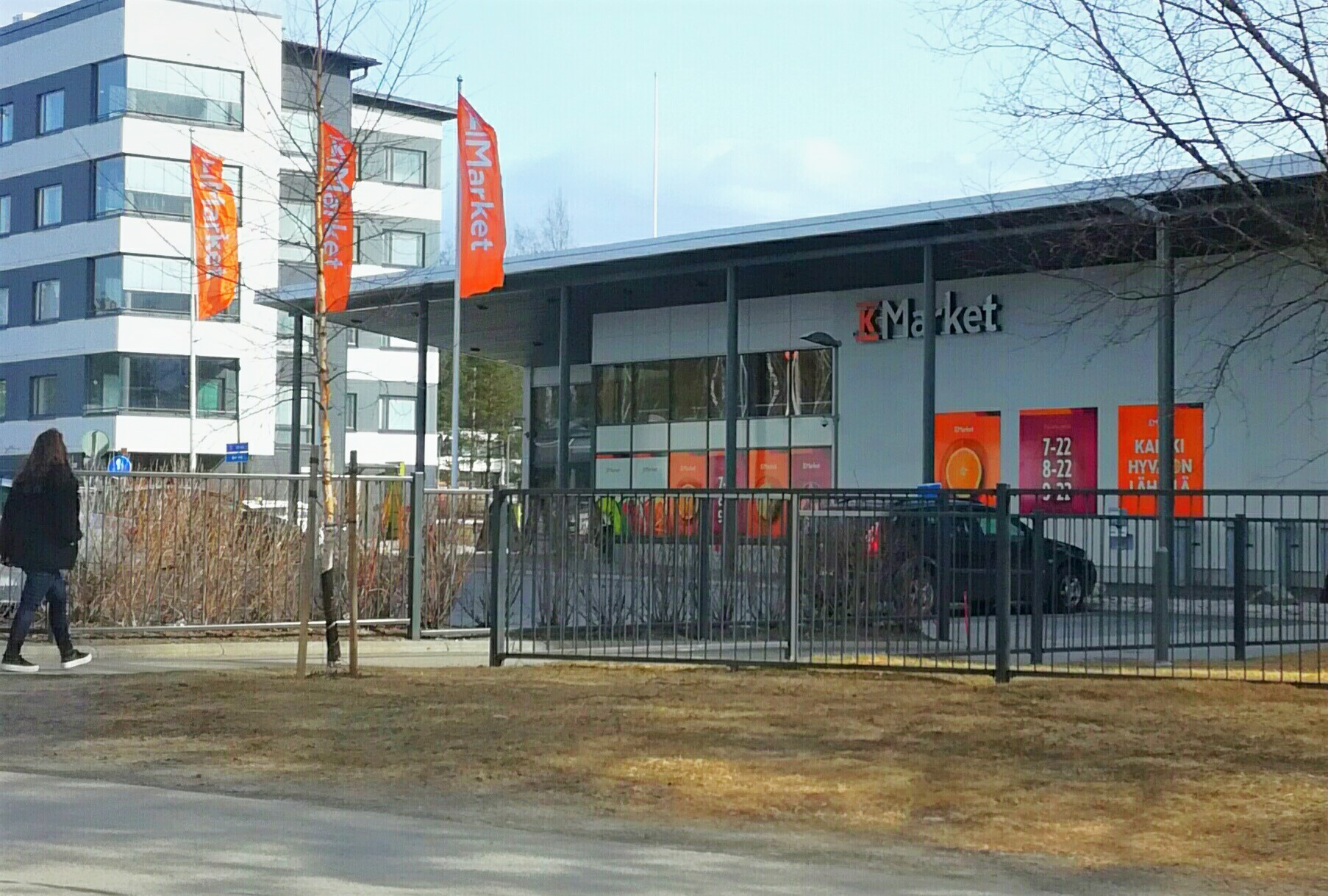
A convenience store in Lohikoski.

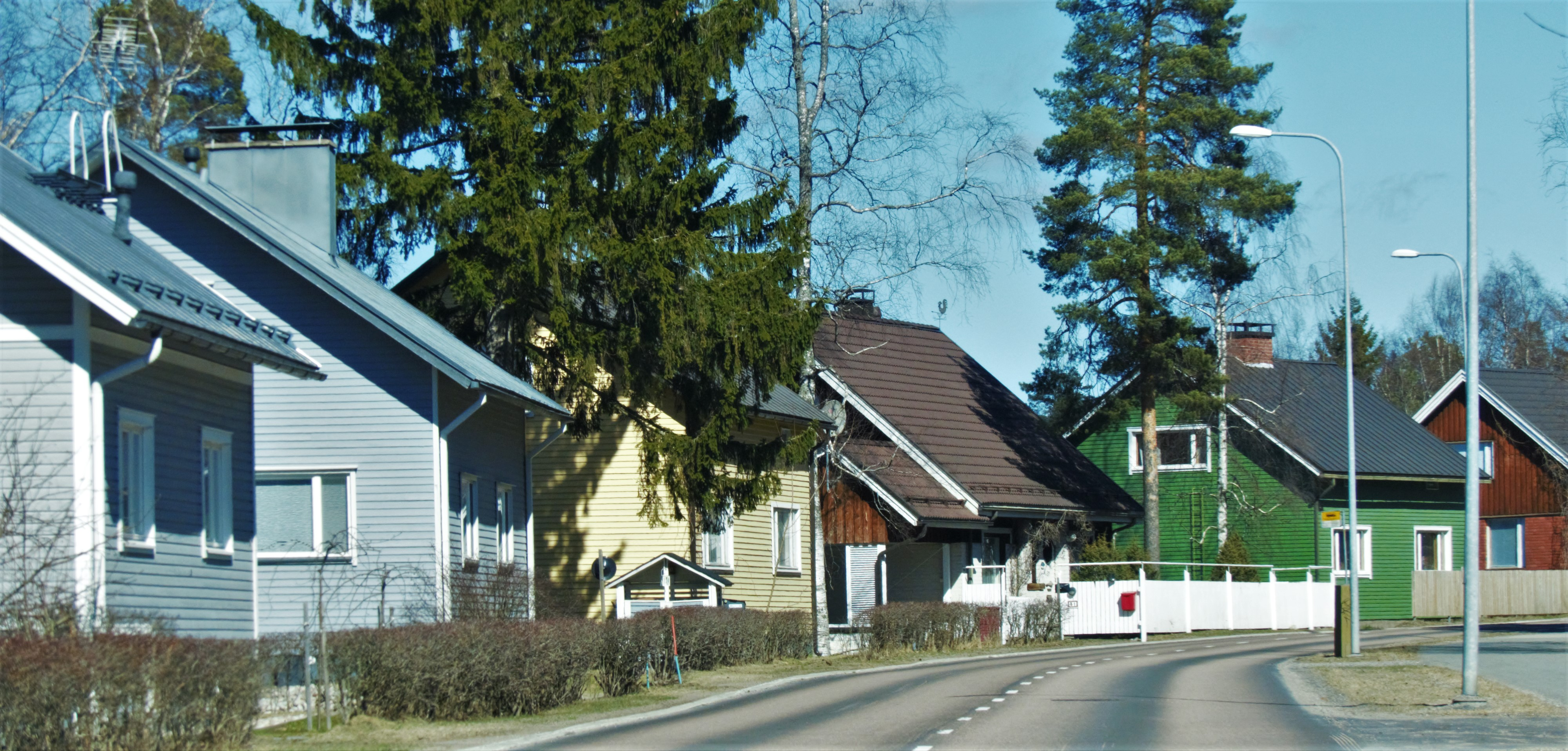
Single-family houses in the area.

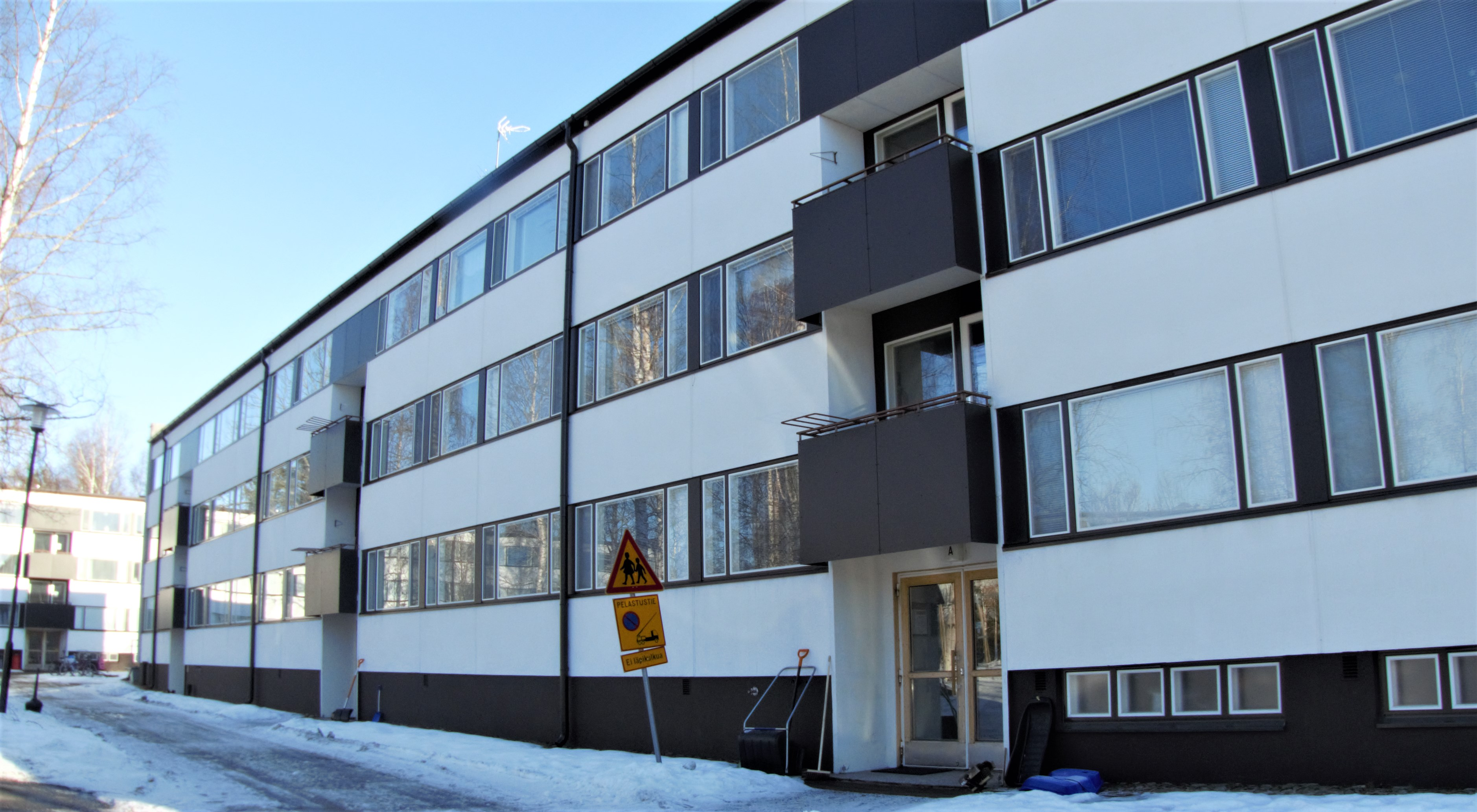
An apartment building built in the 1960s.

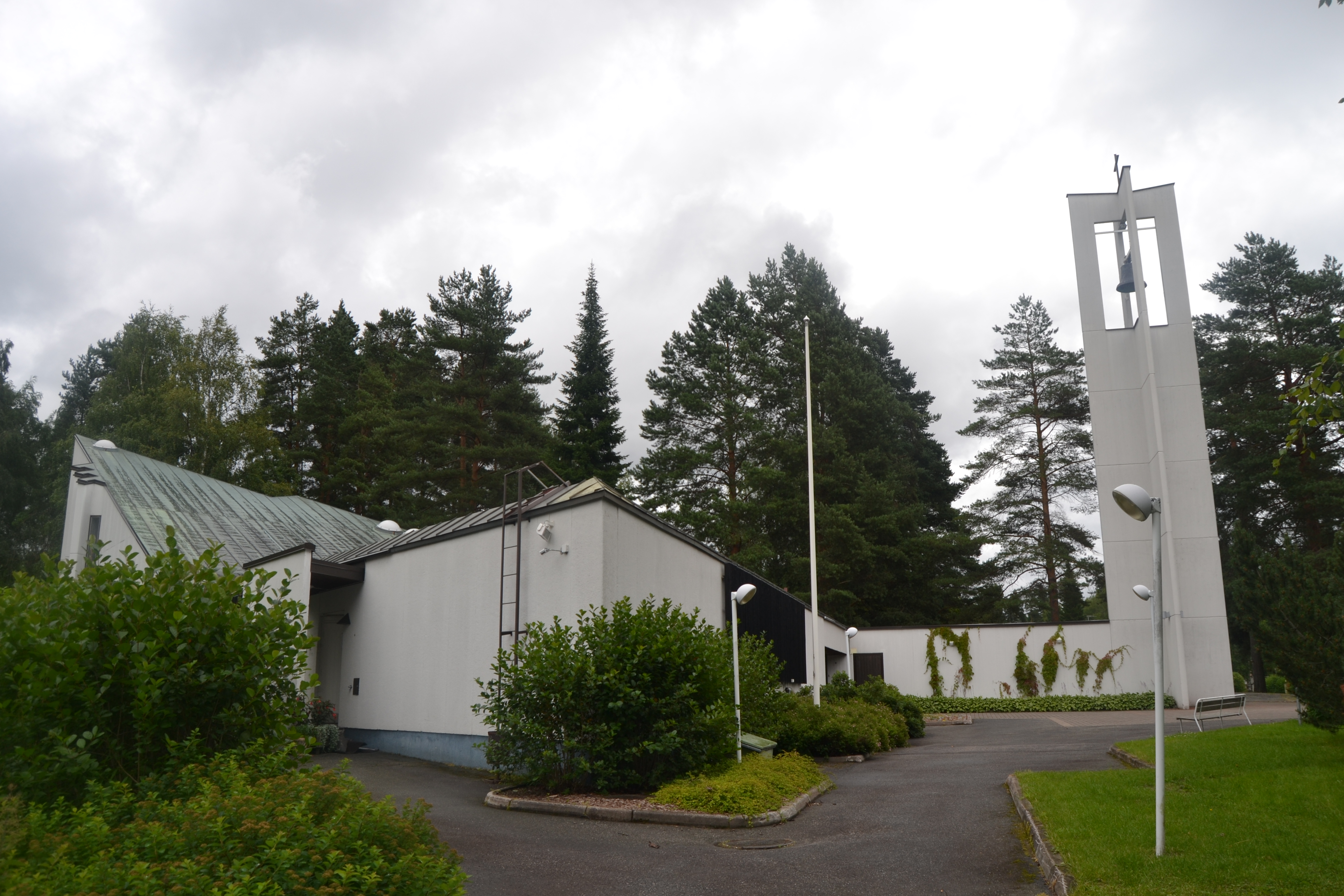
Lohikoski Church

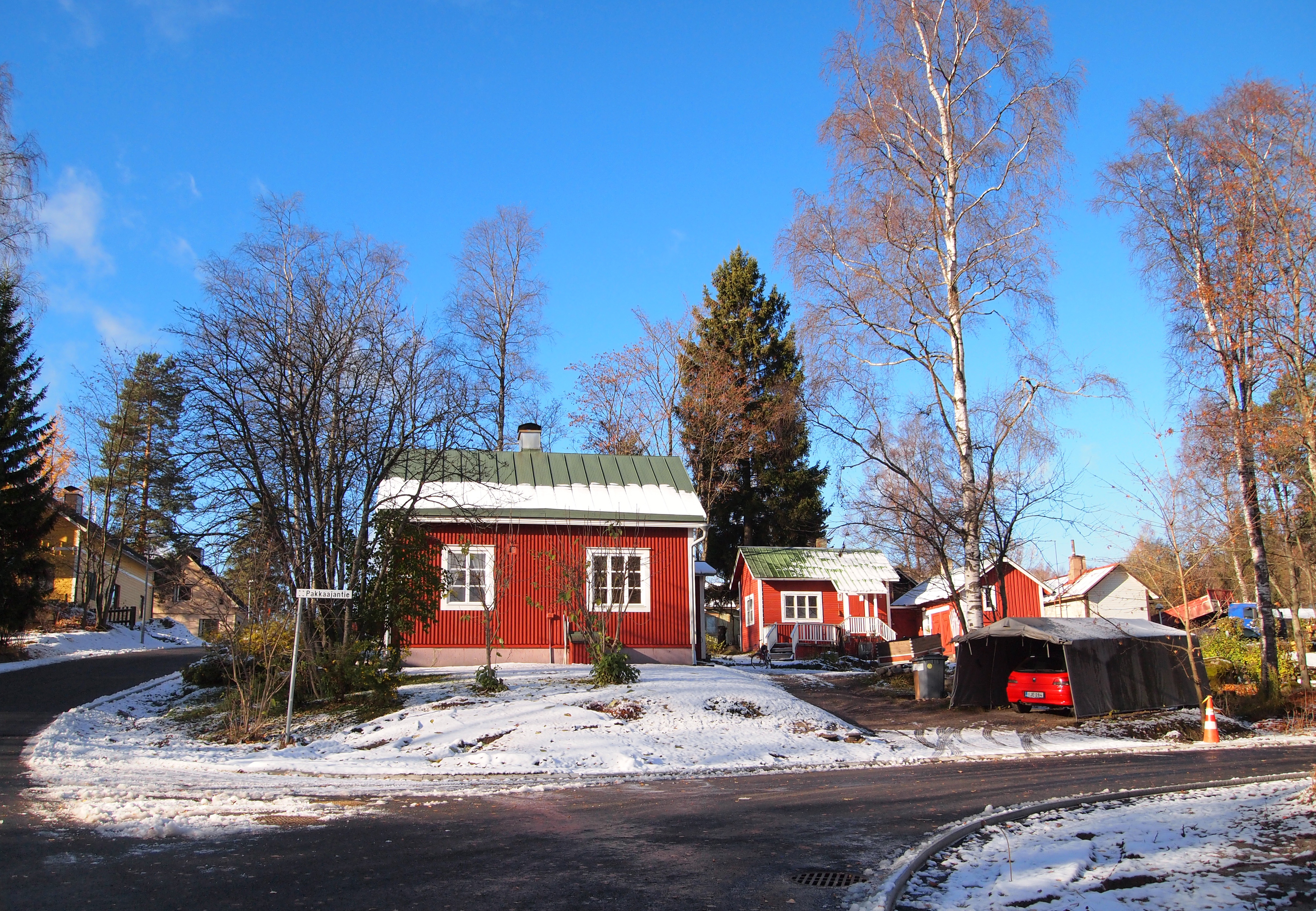
A house in Holsti.

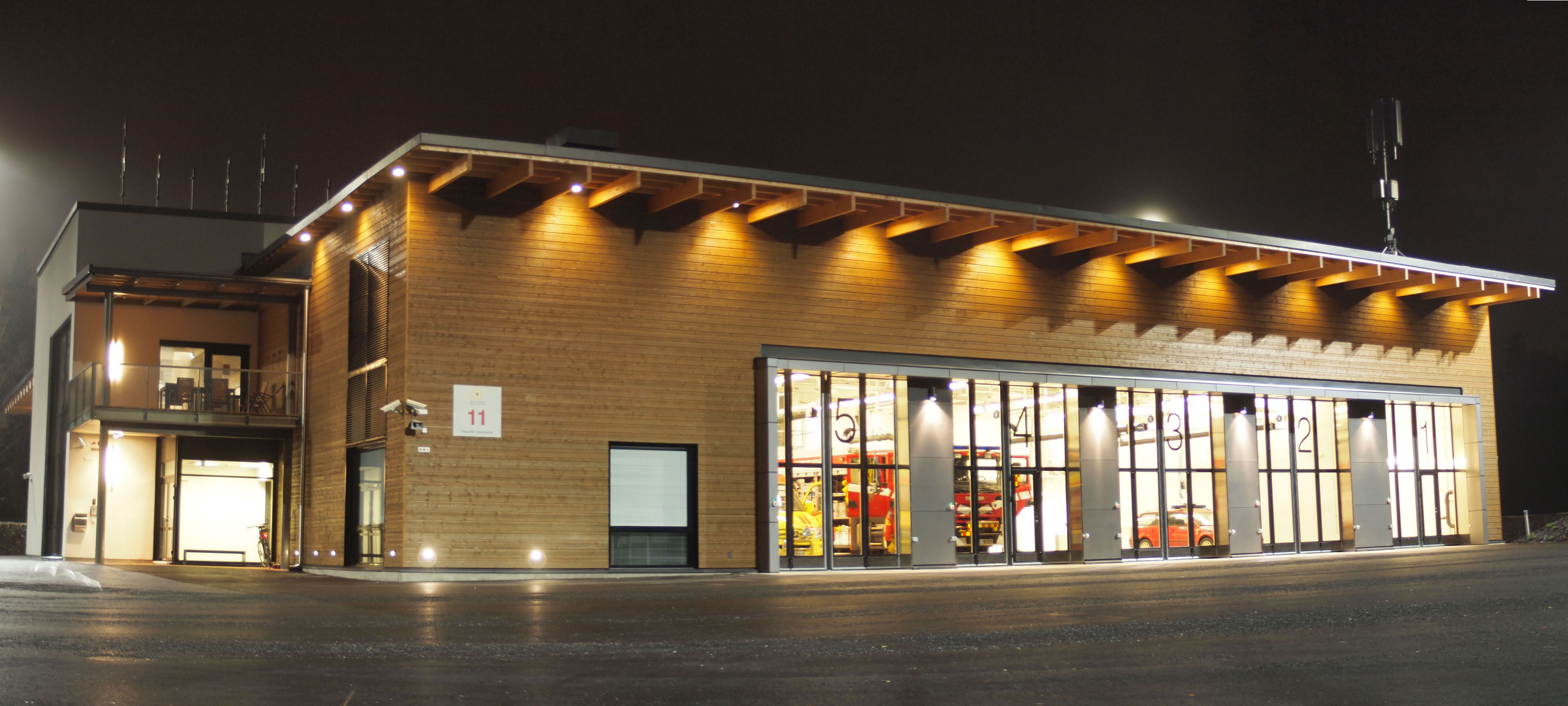
Seppälä fire station
