= Halssila =

Coordinates: 62°15′N 25°48′E

- District of Jyväskylä
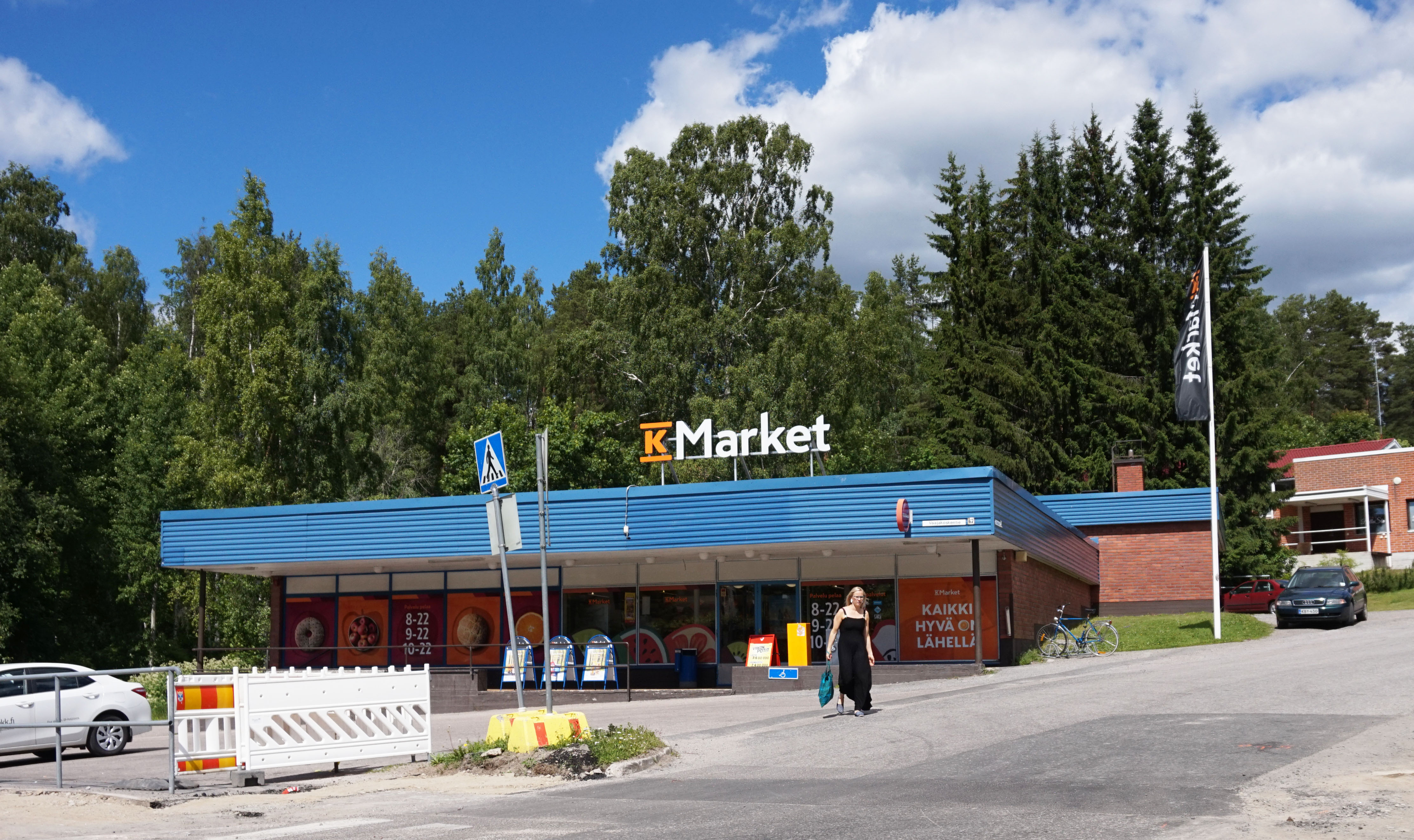
- The center of Halssila
- Country: Finland
- Province: Western Finland
- Region: Central Finland
- Sub-region: Jyväskylä sub-region
- City: Jyväskylä
- Ward: Halssila

Population (2020)
  - Total: 6,123
- Time zone: UTC+2 (EET)
  - Summer (DST): UTC+3 (EEST)

Halssila is one of the districts of Jyväskylä, Finland, located about three kilometers to east from the city center. As of December 2020, the population of Halssila was 6,123.

== History ==
Halssila (or Halsila) was originally the name of a farm in the eastern part of the modern district. Halssila started to develop in the 1920s when factor workers started to build houses in the area. It was merged into Jyväskylä in 1941. Halssila was known as a working-class district, but the reputation started to change in the 1960s after the area started to grow faster and the old labour movement became to fade away. In the 1970s the construction of new neighborhoods, mainly made of apartment buildings, was started. During the 2000s and 2010s other new neighborhoods were constructed.

== Subareas ==
Halssila consists several subareas, which are Tuohimutka, Aholaita, Aittorinne, Halssilanmäki, Halssilanranta, Kivistö, Halssilanrinne and Rauhalahti.

== Notable people ==
- Sofi Oksanen (born 1977), writer
- Erkki Pajala (1929–1992), actor
- Sami Vatanen (born 1991), ice hockey player

== Gallery ==
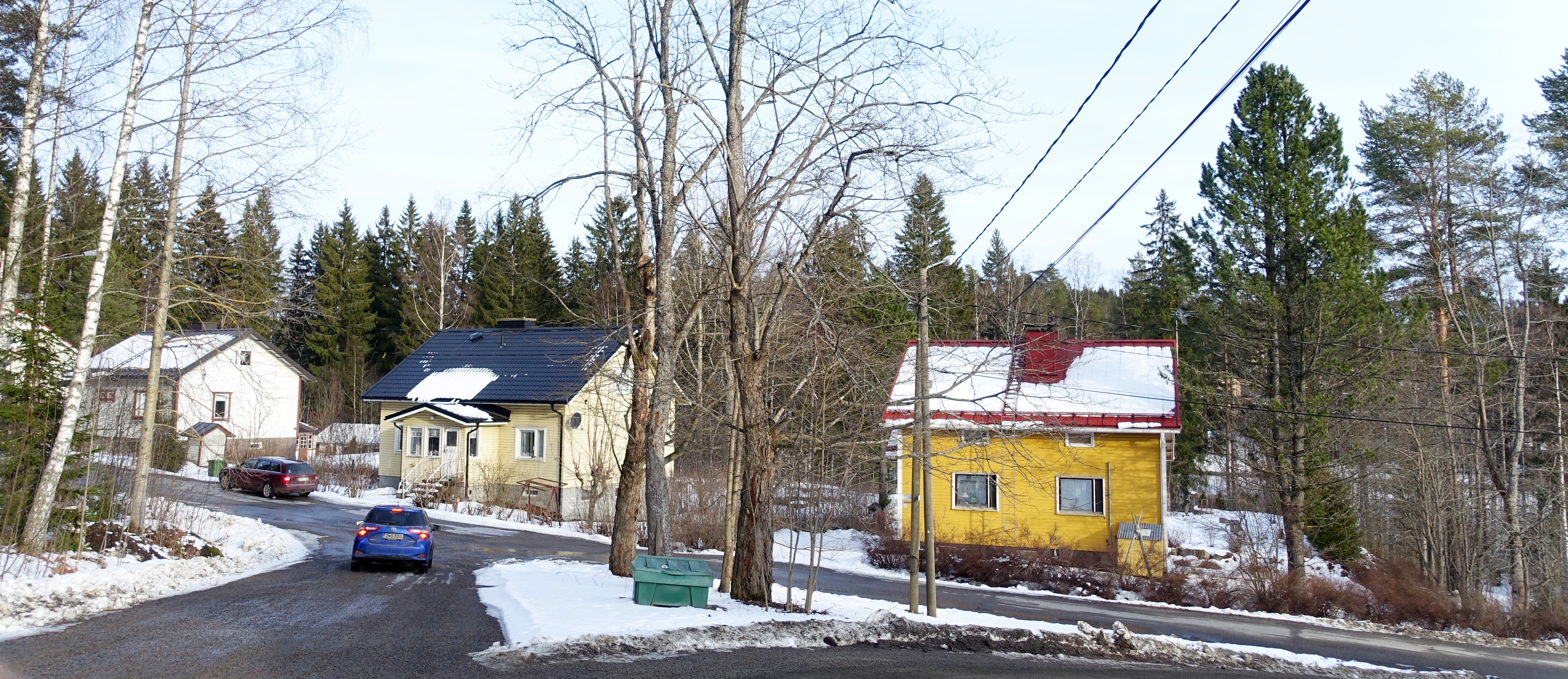
Wooden houses in Halssila.

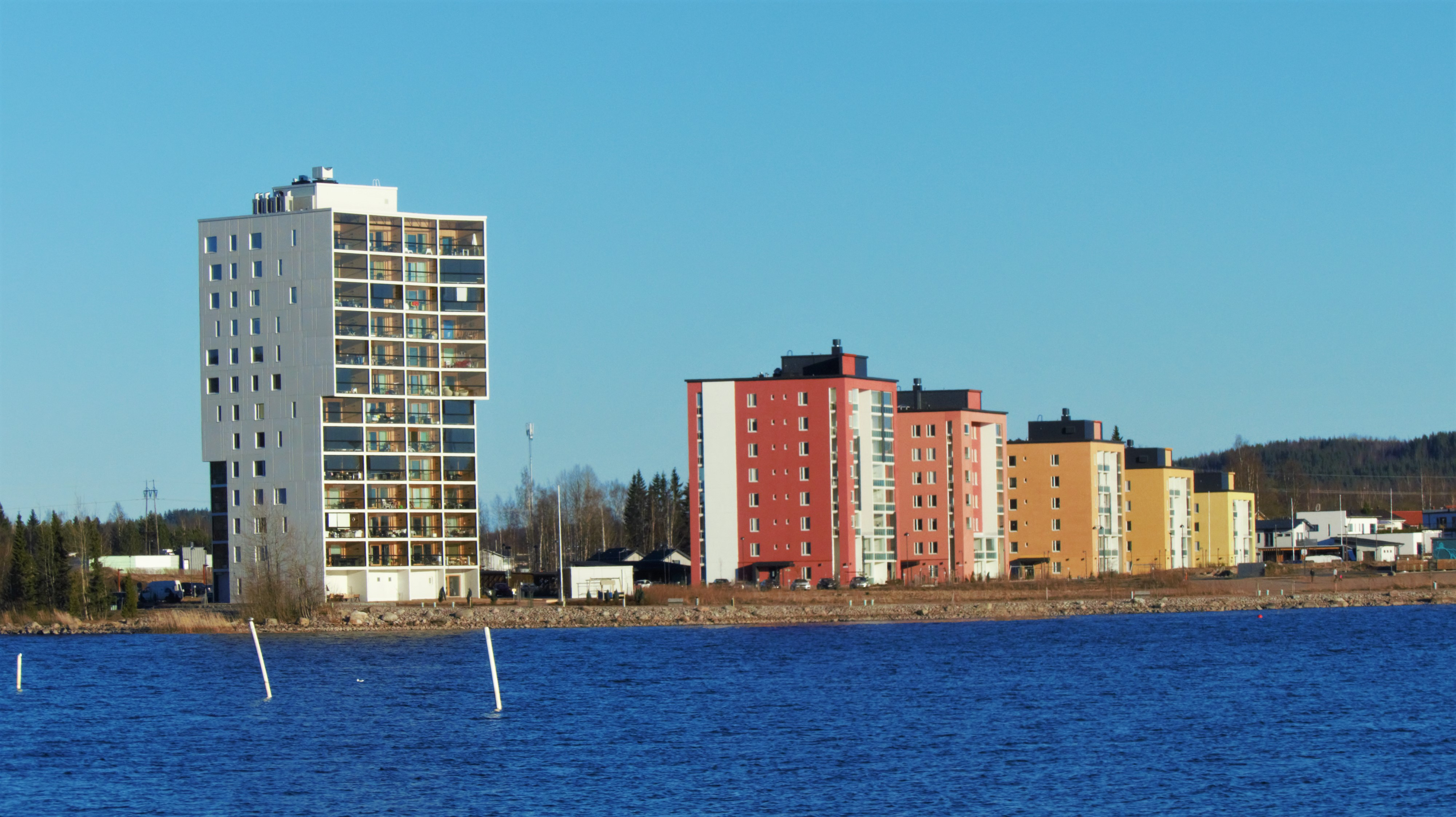
Äijälänranta area in Rauhalahti.

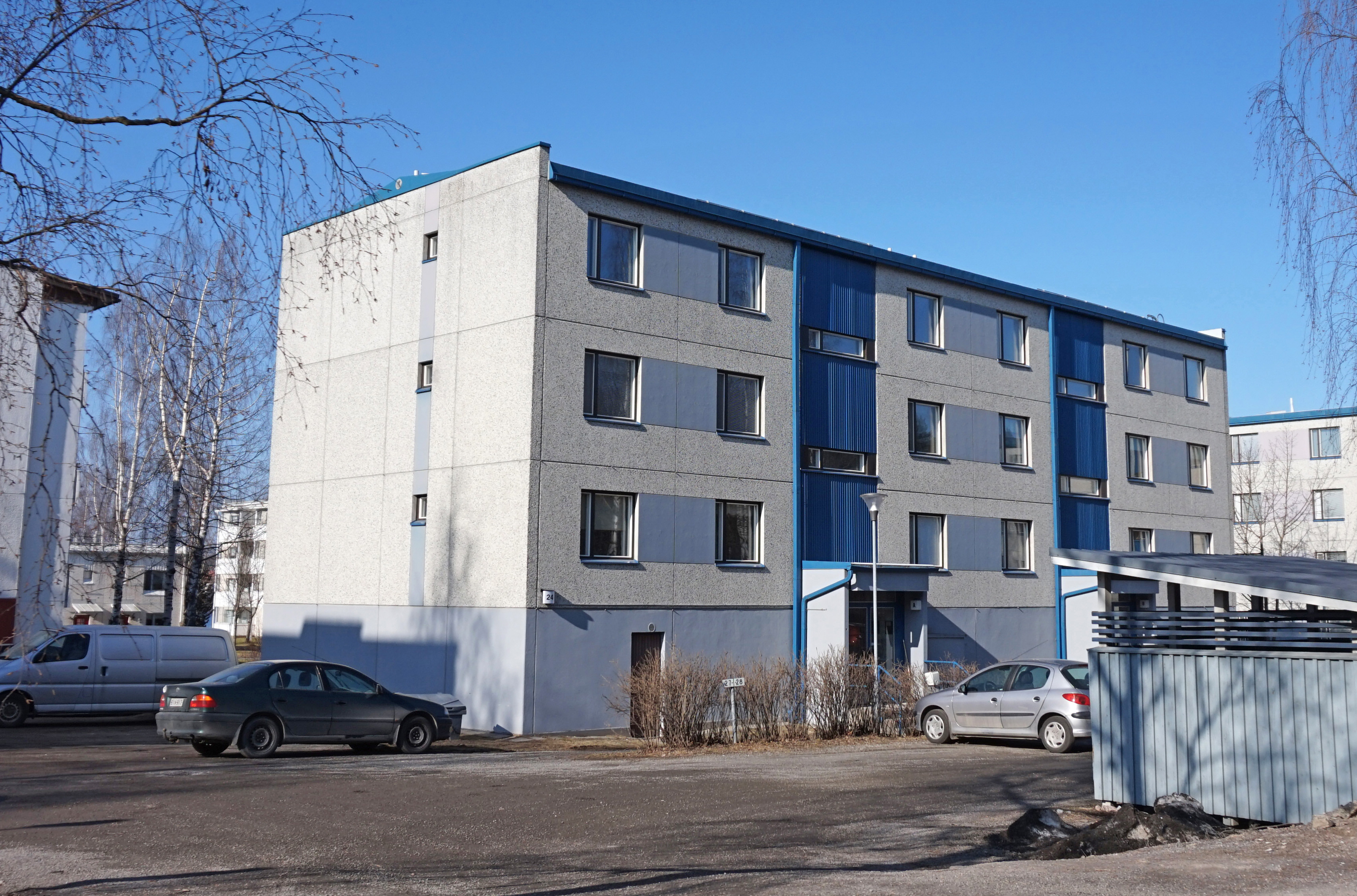
An apartment building in Kivistö.

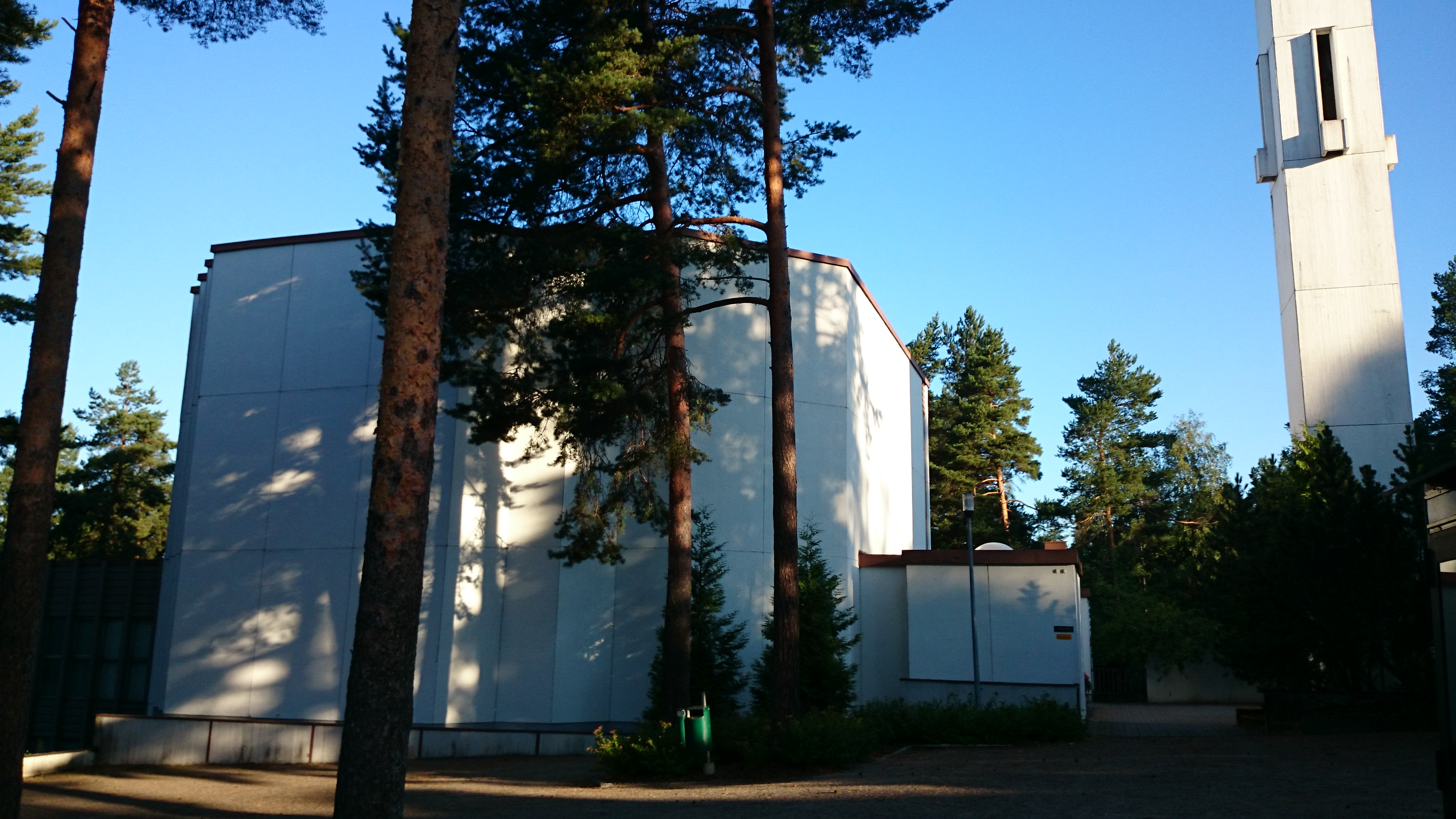
Halssila church
