= Puistola, Jyväskylä =

Coordinates: 62°14′48.34″N 25°45′13.52″E

Puistola
- District of Jyväskylä
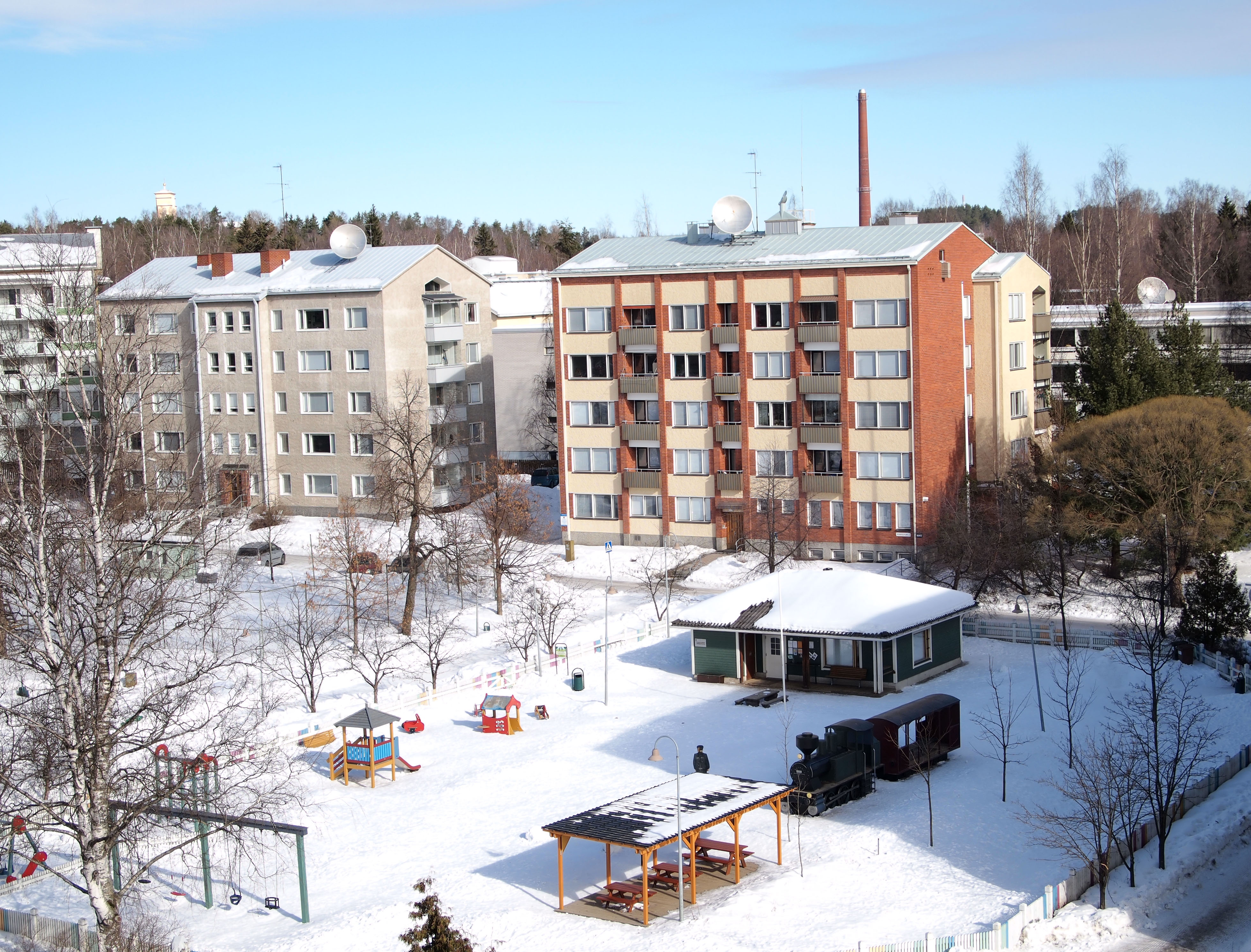
- View from the street Kalevankatu to Puistola
- Country: Finland
- Province: Western Finland
- Region: Central Finland
- Sub-region: Jyväskylä sub-region
- City: Jyväskylä
- Ward: Kantakaupunki
- Time zone: UTC+2 (EET)
  - Summer (DST): UTC+3 (EEST)
- Postal code: 40100 JYVÄSKYLÄ

Puistola is a district of Jyväskylä, Finland on the shores of Tourujoki river near the city centre. The city centre of Jyväskylä is bordering Puistola in Southwest. Puistola is located on a small area between the streets of Vapaudenkatu, Väinönkatu, Yliopistonkatu, Puistokatu and Tourujoki river. Puistola is only 800 metres (2,600 ft) long and about 300 metres (980 ft) wide. Southern part of the district has high population density. The old graveyard of Jyväskylä is in the Northern parts of the district.

== Gallery ==
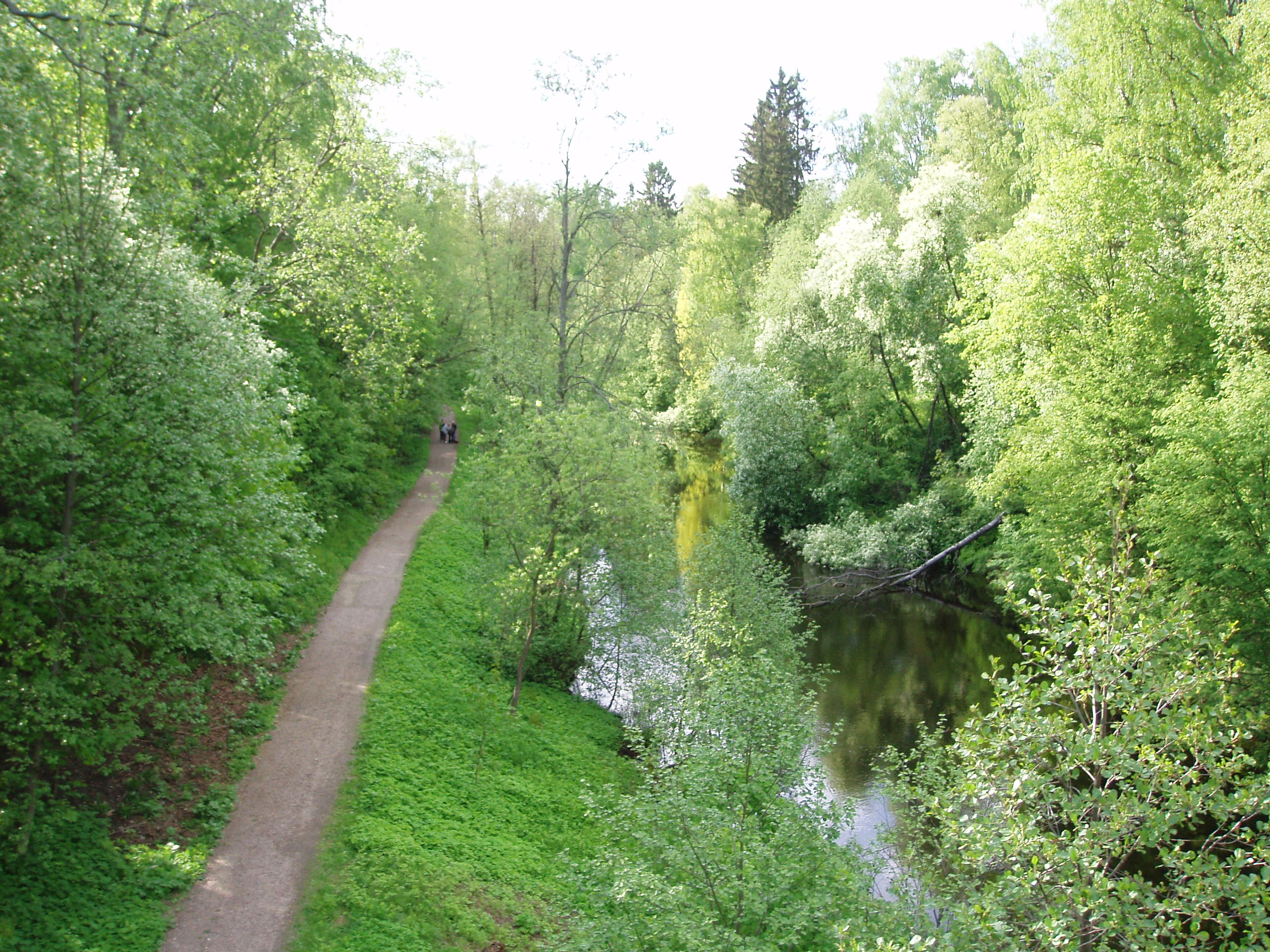
Tourujoki is a small nature reserve and river in Puistola, almost in the Jyväskylä city centre.

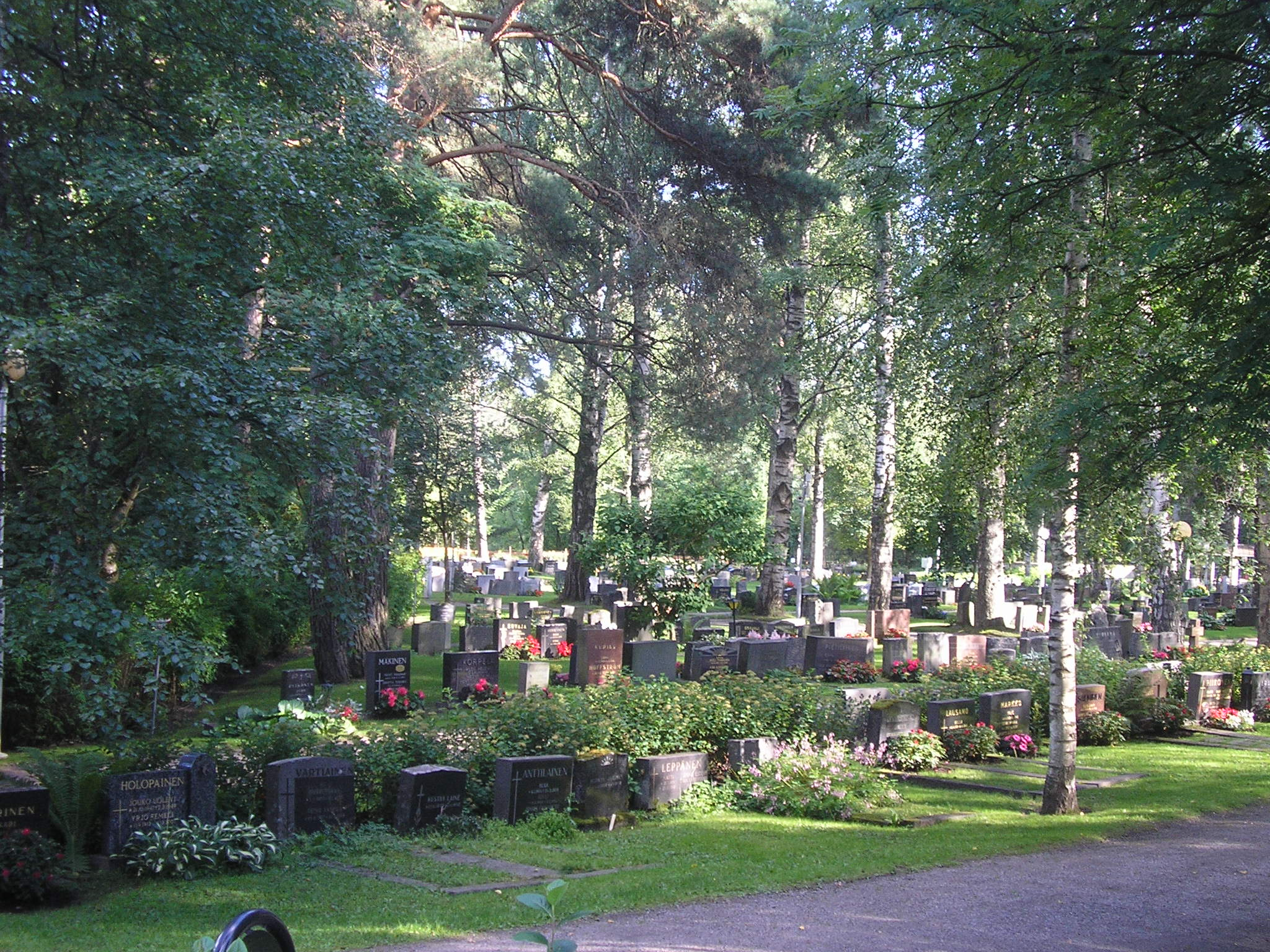
Jyväskylä old graveyard is located in the Northern end of Puistola

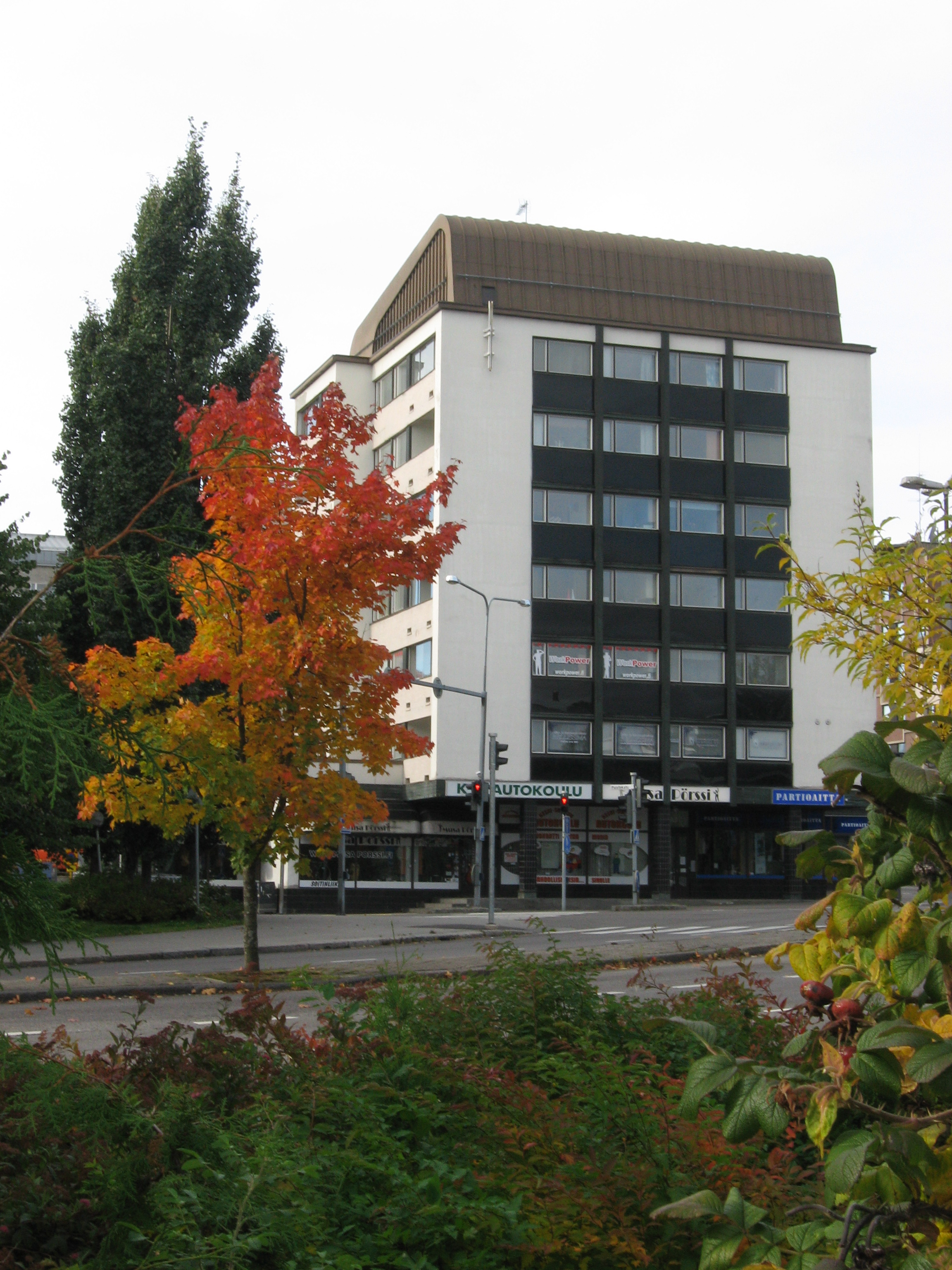
Musapörssi house seen from Puistola
