= Viitaniemi =

- Suburb of Jyväskylä
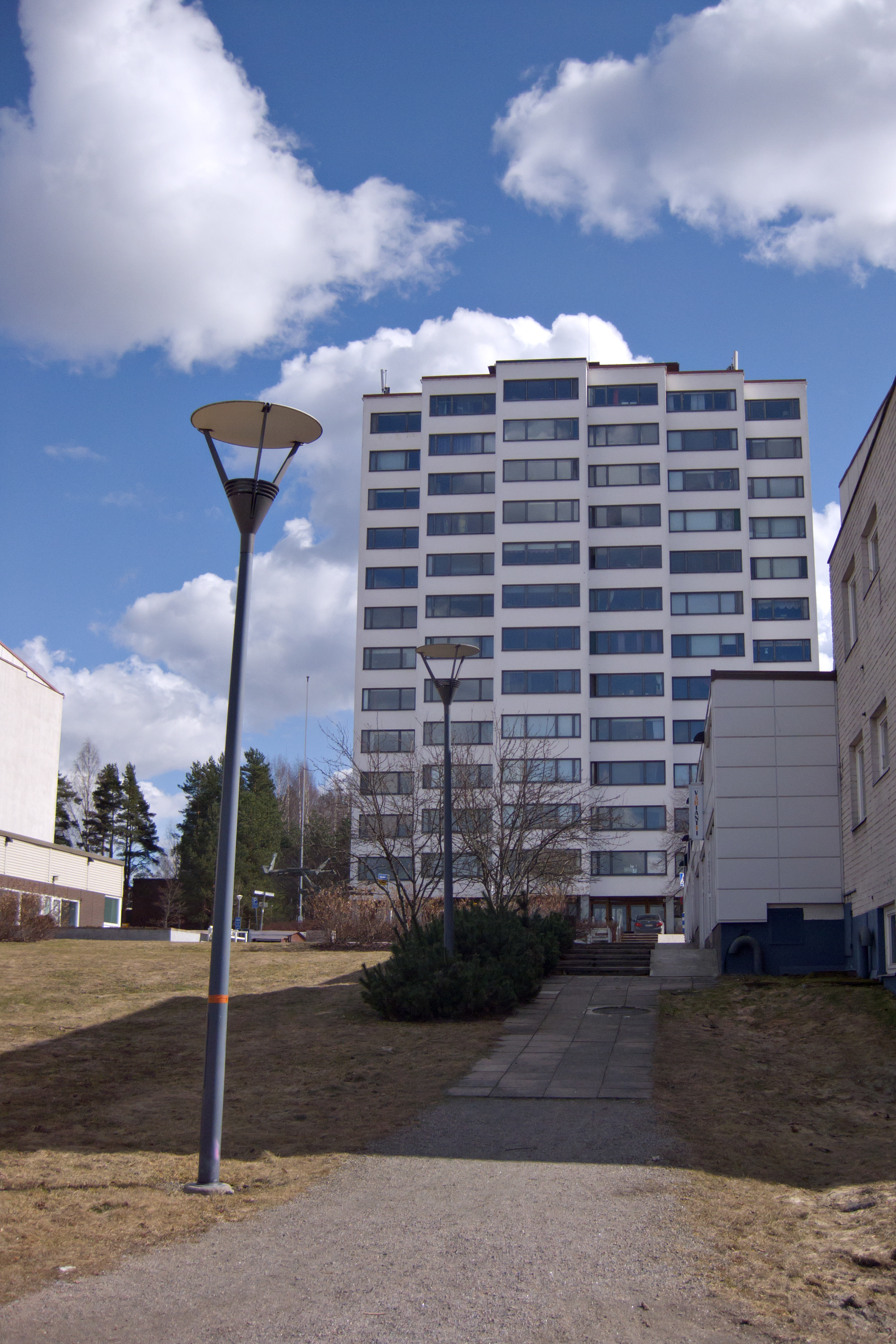
- Viitatorni
- Coordinates: 62°15′10″N 25°43′58″E
- Country: Finland
- Region: Central Finland
- Sub-region: Jyväskylä sub-region
- City: Jyväskylä
- Ward: Kantakaupunki
- District: Nisula
- Time zone: UTC+2 (EET)
  - Summer (DST): UTC+3 (EEST)
- Postal code: 40720 JYVÄSKYLÄ

Viitaniemi is a neighborhood in the Nisula district of Jyväskylä, Finland. It was built during 1959–1964. In 1962, the landmark of the suburb, Viitatorni designed by Alvar Aalto, was built. Viitaniemi is considered to be an architecturally significant area.

== Gallery ==
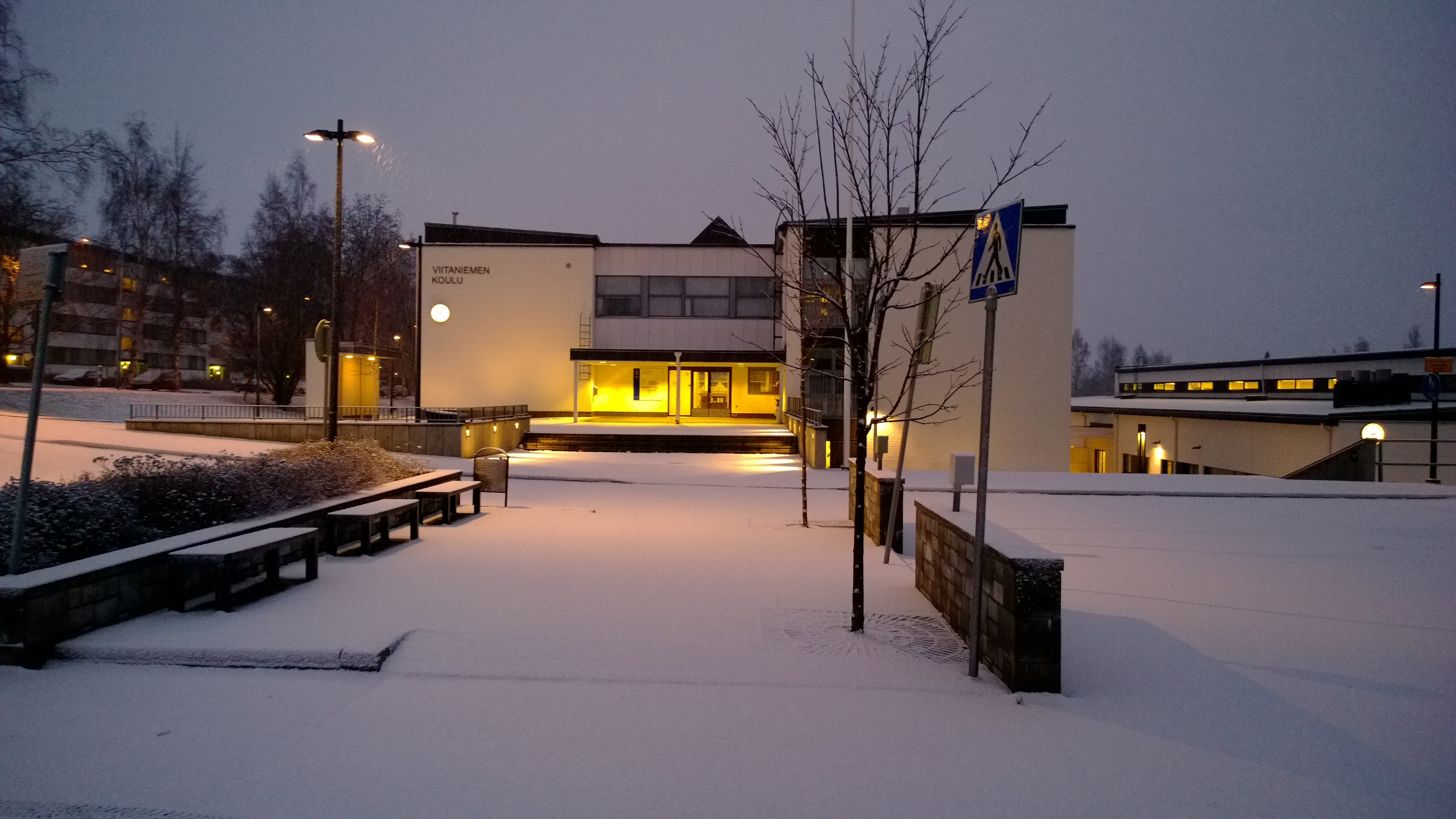
Viitaniemi school

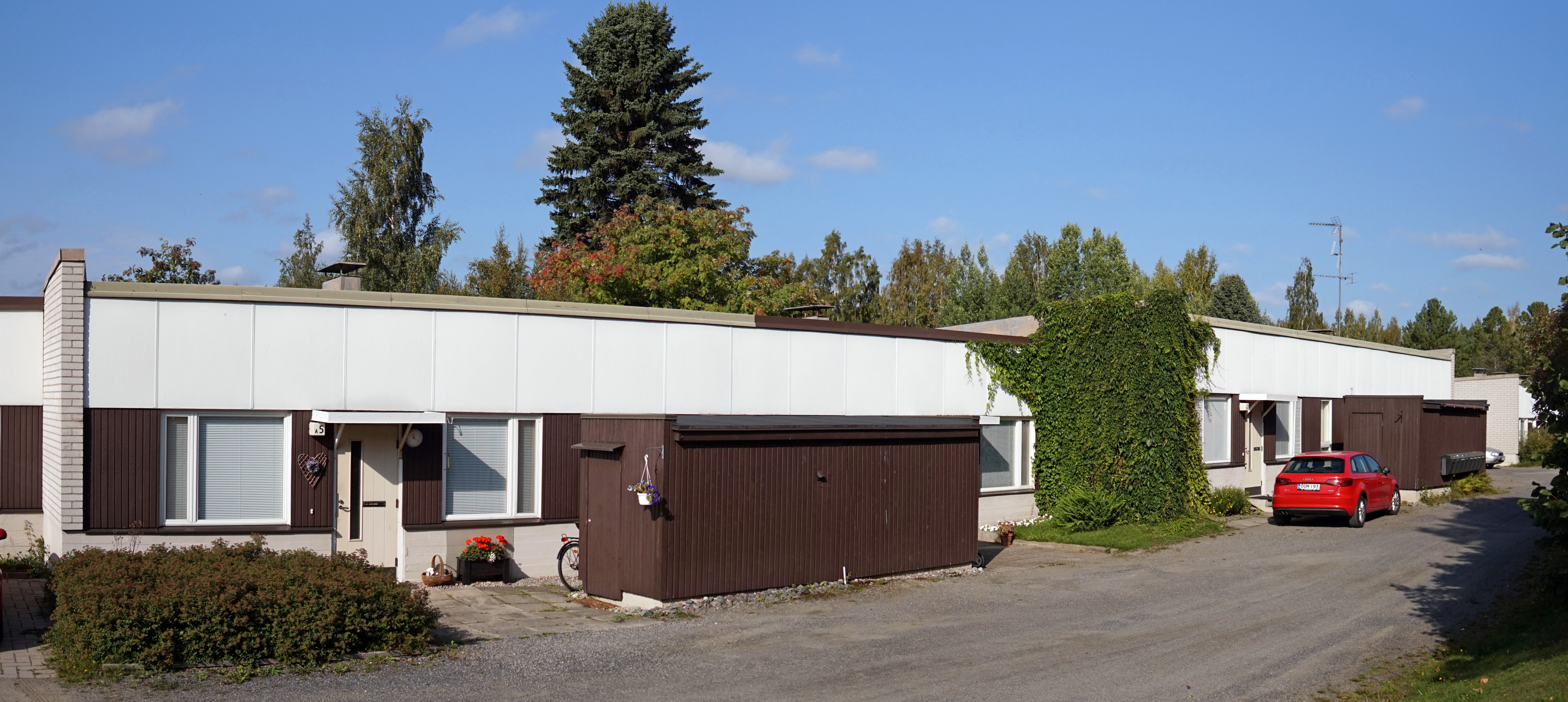
Row houses in Viitaniemi

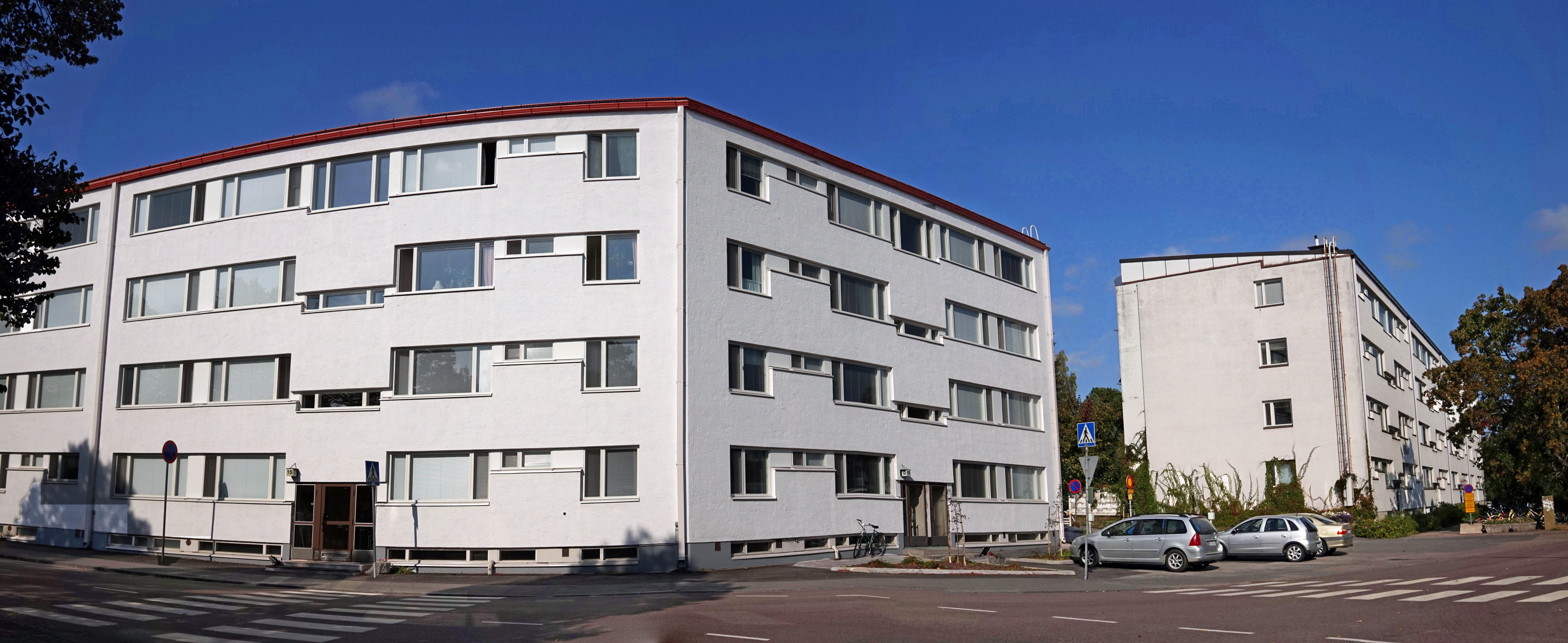
An apartment building
