= Rautakirja =

Rautakirja Oy was a Finnish company operating subsidiary businesses such as R-kioski.

Rautakirja Oy operates in Finland, Estonia, Latvia, Lithuania, Romania, Germany and Russia. Rautakirja Oy owns the Estonian company AS Rautakirja Estonia.

On the 25 August 2011, it was announced that Rautakirja will sell the Suomalainen Kirjakauppa segment of its business to Otava for in excess of 27 million euro.

== History ==
The history of Rautakirja begins with Rautatiekirjakauppa Osakeyhtiö (Railway Bookstore Ltd), founded in 1910, whose largest owners were the publishing houses of Otava, Werner Söderström (WSOY), Uusi Suometar, and Hufvudstadsbladet. These publishing companies founded Rautatiekirjakauppa to sell literature and newspapers at Finnish railway stations. During its first year of operation, the company opened 36 station kiosks and also started selling newspapers on trains, as well as wholesaling magazines and literature.

Akseli Kinnunen, who joined the company in 1911 and later received the honorary title of Commercial Counselor (kauppaneuvos), served as its long-time CEO from 1917 all the way to 1955.

In 1933, the company opened its first kiosks outside of railway stations and began selling items such as sweets and tobacco, in addition to reading materials. In 1940, when betting operations started in Finland, the kiosks also began serving as betting agencies. In 1958, the name R-kioski was introduced, and the kiosks quickly began to spread to shopping centers. The 500th R-kioski was opened in 1971, and during its peak in the 1980s, there were over eight hundred kiosks. The first R-kioski located outside of Finland was opened in Tallinn in 1993.

=== Sanoma merger 2003 ===
At the beginning of March 2003, Rautakirja Oyj merged with SanomaWSOY, which also ended the listing of Rautakirja's shares on the Helsinki Stock Exchange. At the same time, Rautakirja's business operations were incorporated into a newly formed company, Rautakirja Oy.
