= Mäki-Matti =

- District of Jyväskylä
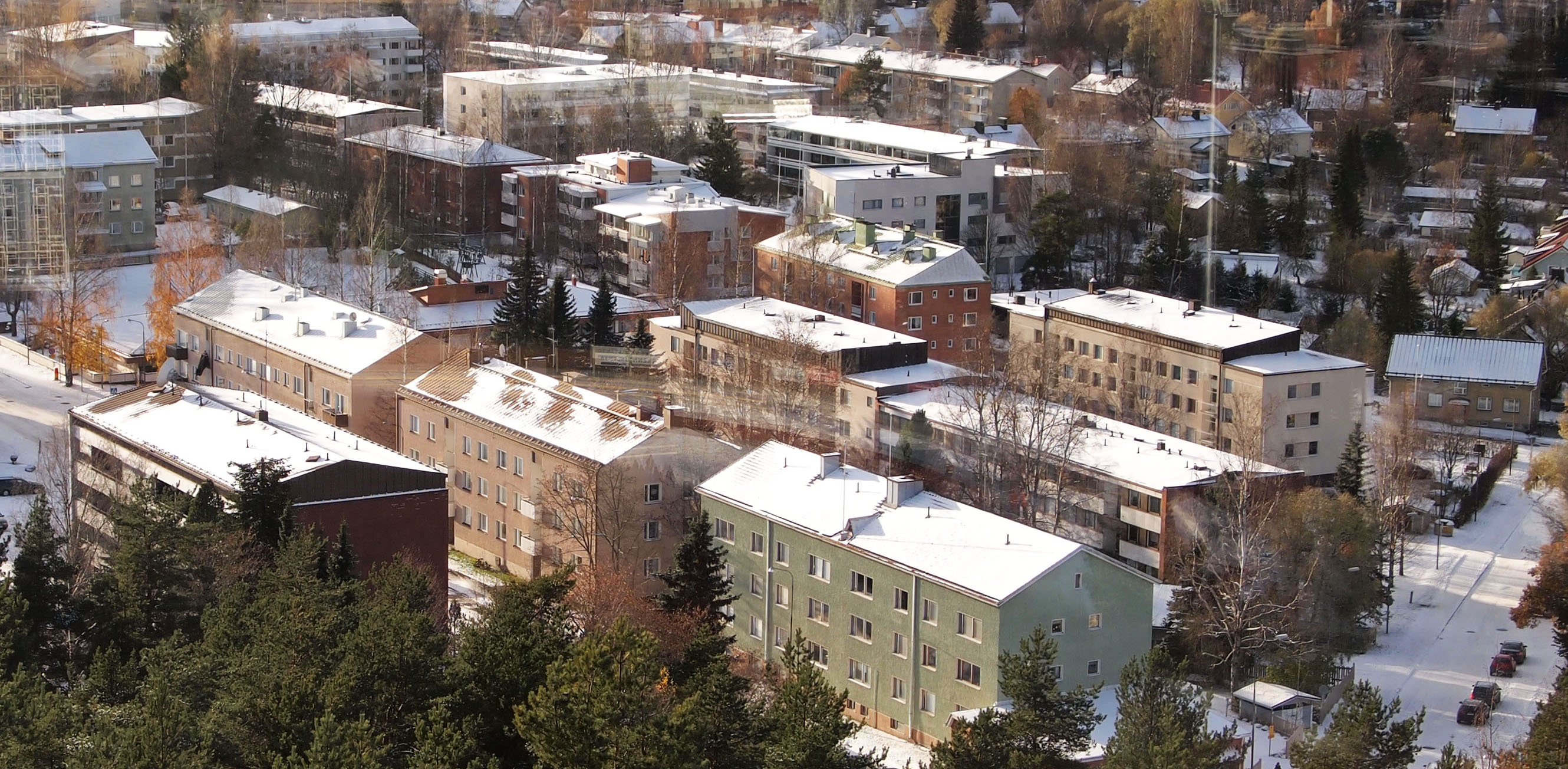
- View from tower Vesilinna to Mäki-Matti.
- Coordinates: 62.2428°N 25.7296°E
- Country: Finland
- Province: Western Finland
- Region: Central Finland
- Sub-region: Jyväskylä sub-region
- City: Jyväskylä
- Ward: Kantakaupunki

Population (2020)
  - Total: 4,677
- Time zone: UTC+2 (EET)
  - Summer (DST): UTC+3 (EEST)
- Postal code: 40700 JYVÄSKYLÄ

Mäki-Matti is a district and a statistical area of Jyväskylä, Finland and a part of the Kantakaupunki ward. The statistical area contains the Nousukatu, Hippos, Rautpohja, Kyllö and Syrjälä subareas. Mäki-Matti has several services such as schools, a convenience store, a pub and a R-Kioski shop. The oldest family park of Finland is also located in the district.

Mäki-Matti is the first suburb of Jyväskylä to be merged into the city, which was done in 1914.

== History ==
Mäki-Matti is named after a tenant farmer named Matti Matinpoika (fl. 1806-1865), whose tenure farm was split from the Syrjälä/Taavettila farm. A hill in the area was given the name Mäki-Matin mäki after Matti and his home. Eventually the name was given to the community that had developed in the area.

Osuuskauppa Mäki-Matti was founded in 1905. It was one of the first cooperative shops in Finland. Mäki-Matti was transferred from Jyväskylän maalaiskunta to Jyväskylä in 1908.

== Gallery ==
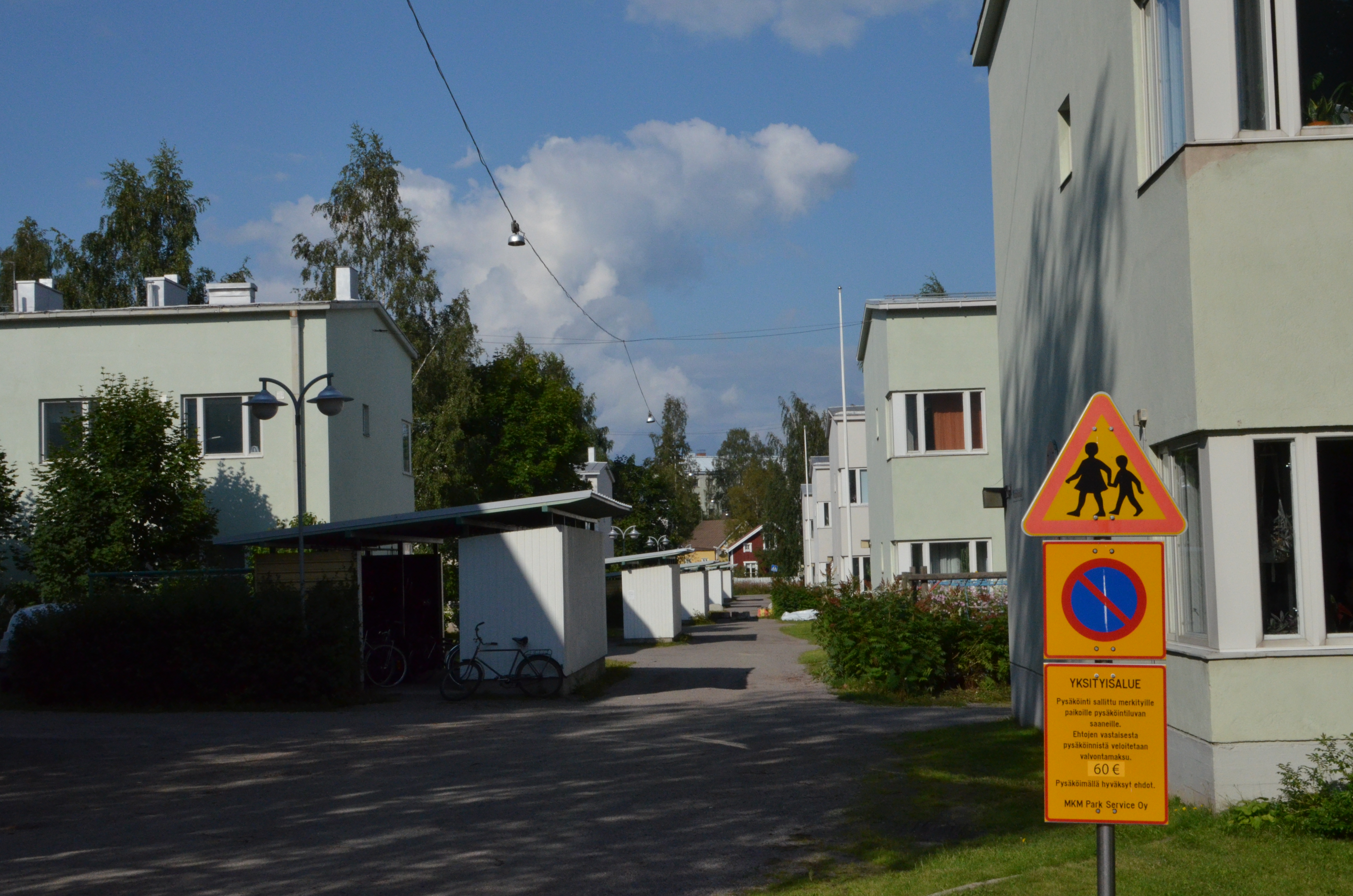
Functionalist apartment buildings in Rautpohja.

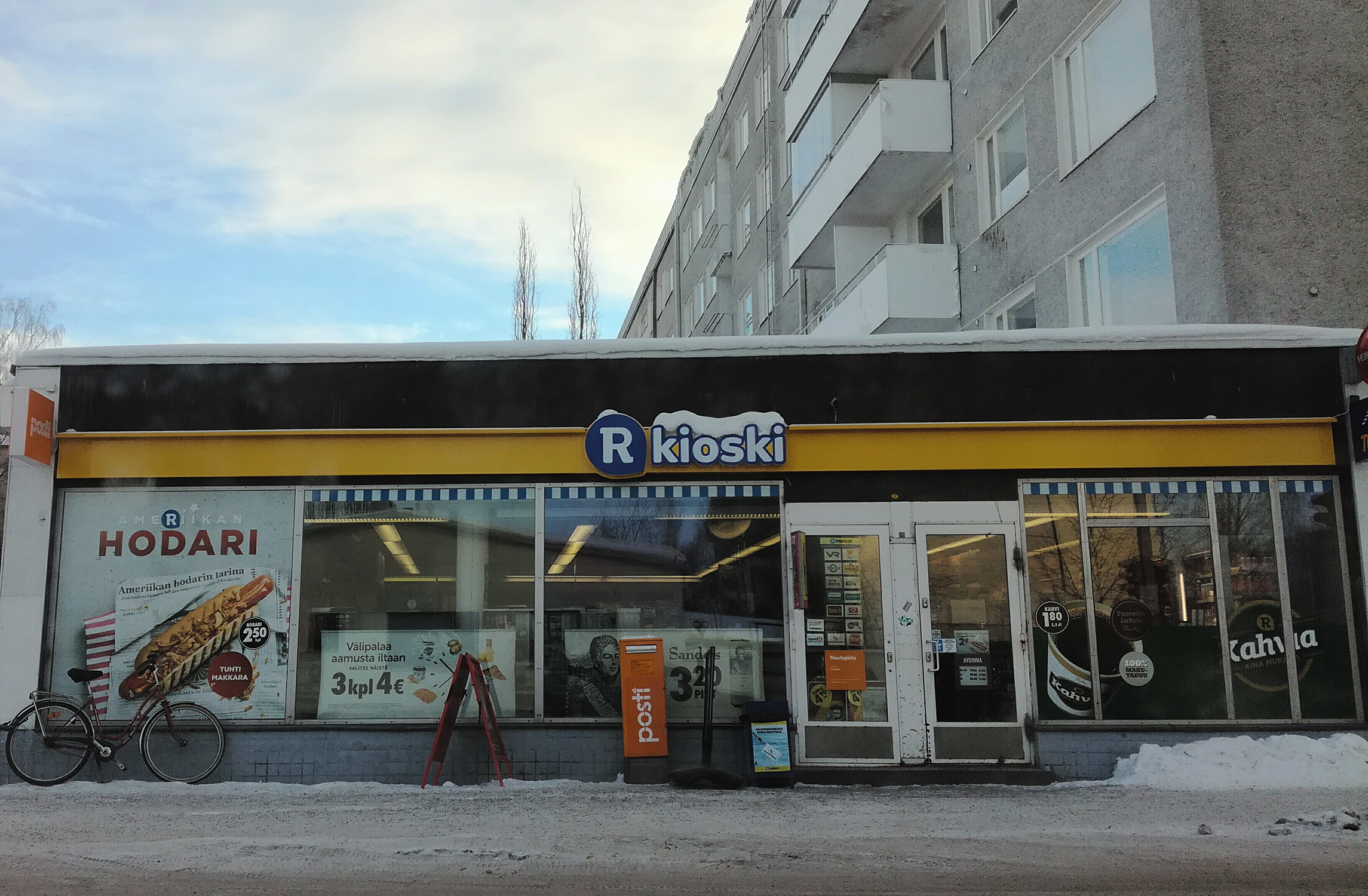
An R-kioski shop with postal services in Mäki-Matti.

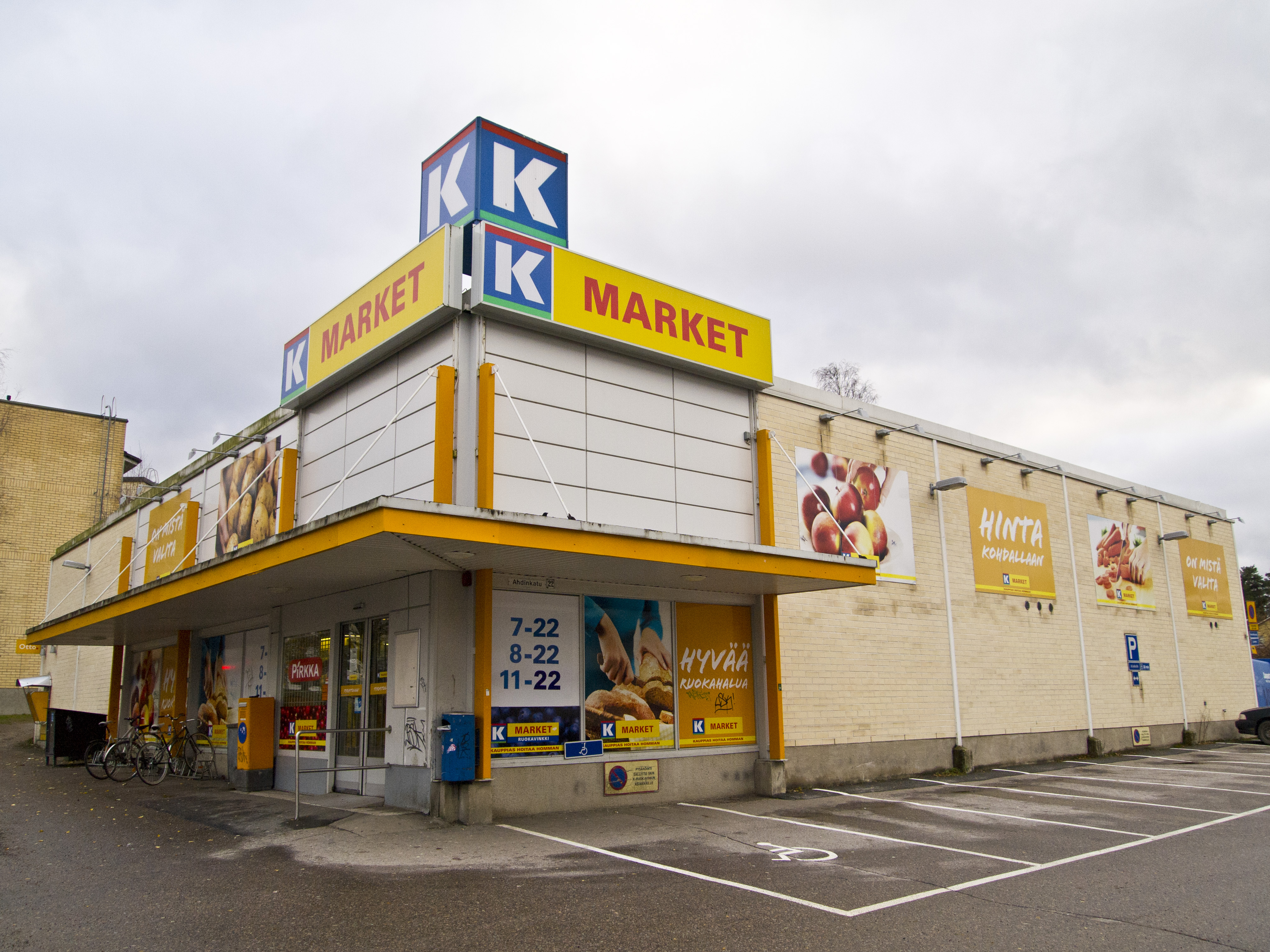
A convenience store in Mäki-Matti.

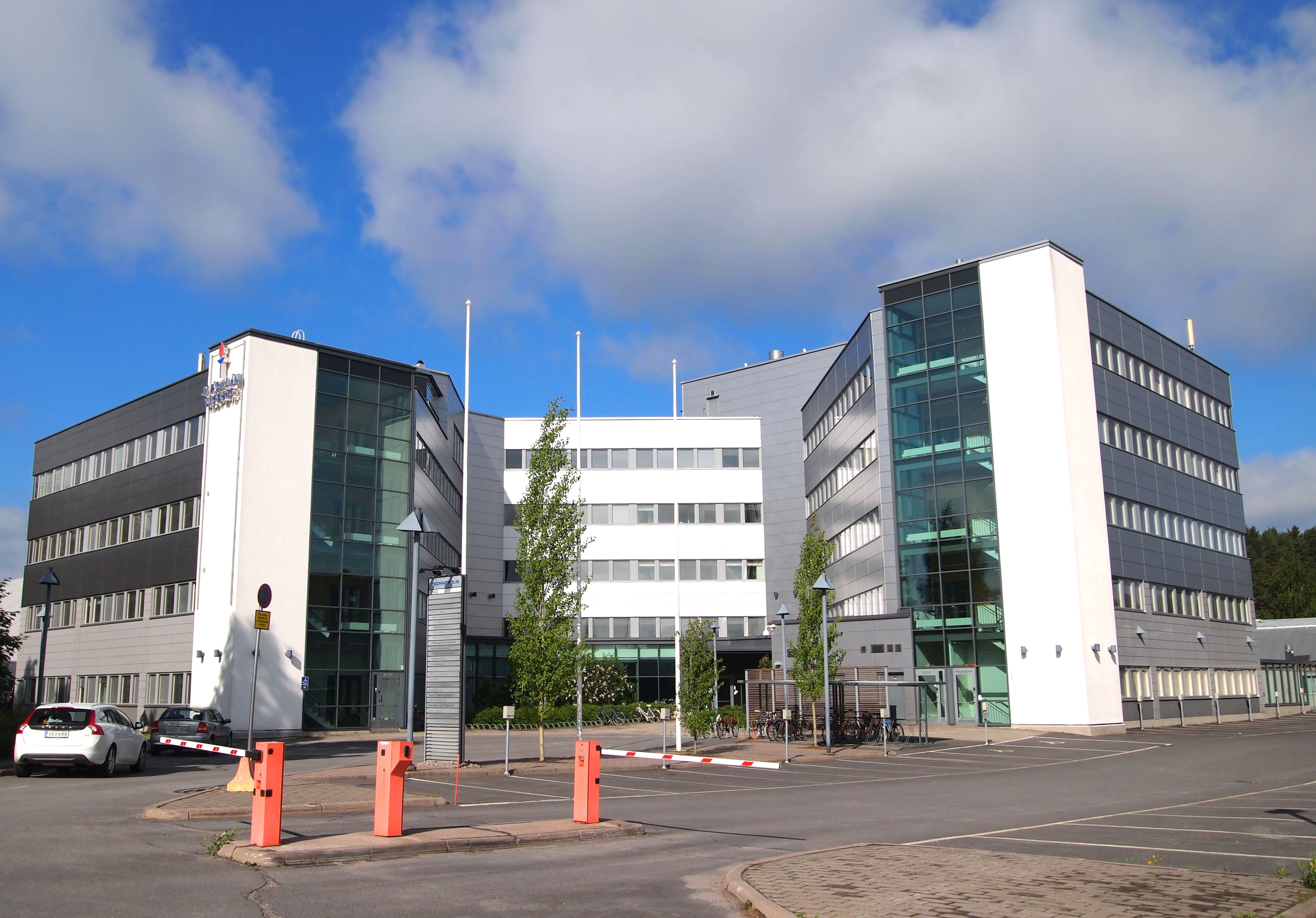
Building Viveca in the Hippos area.

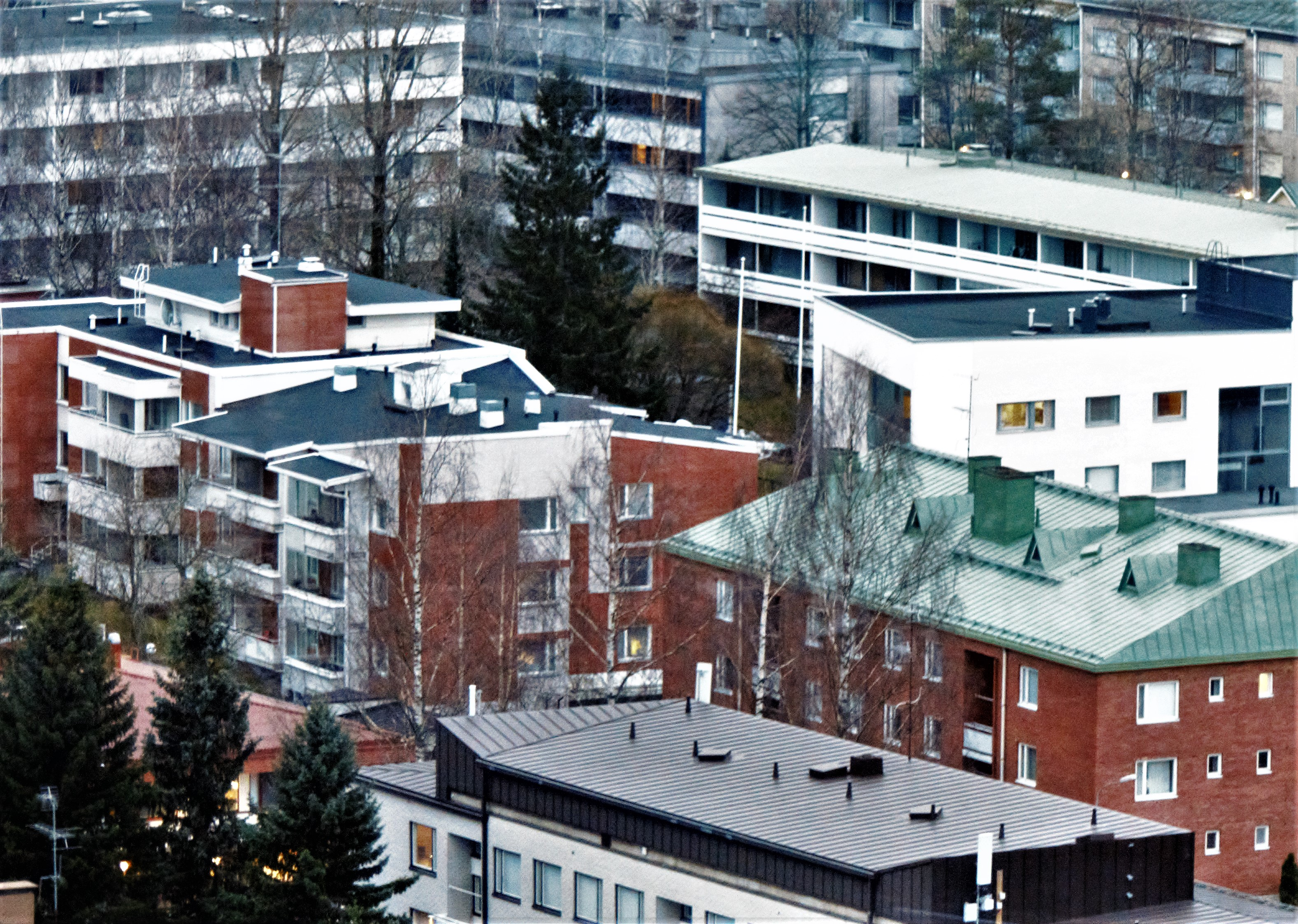
Apartment buildings in the Nousukatu subarea.

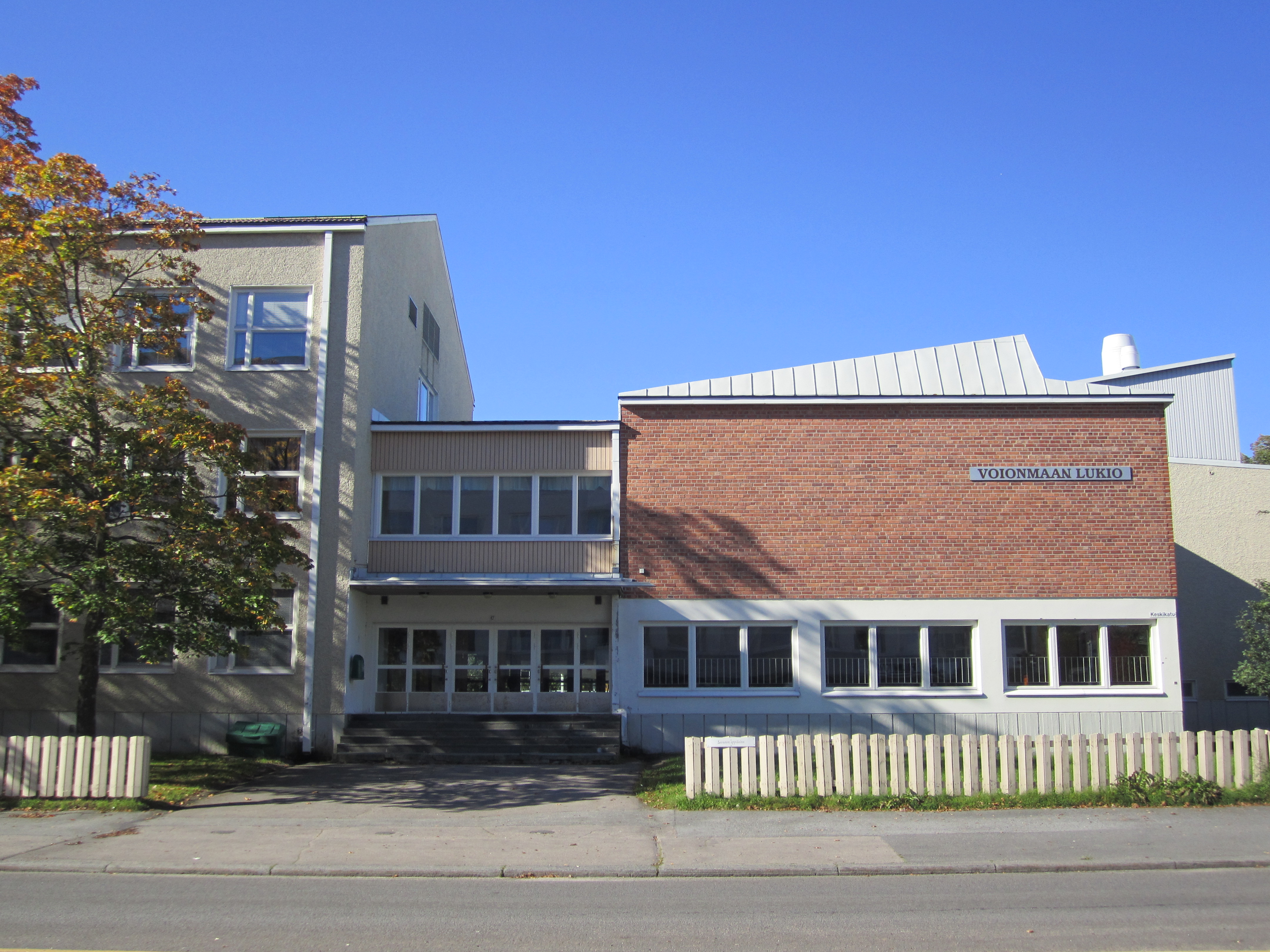
Schildt Upper Secondary School.

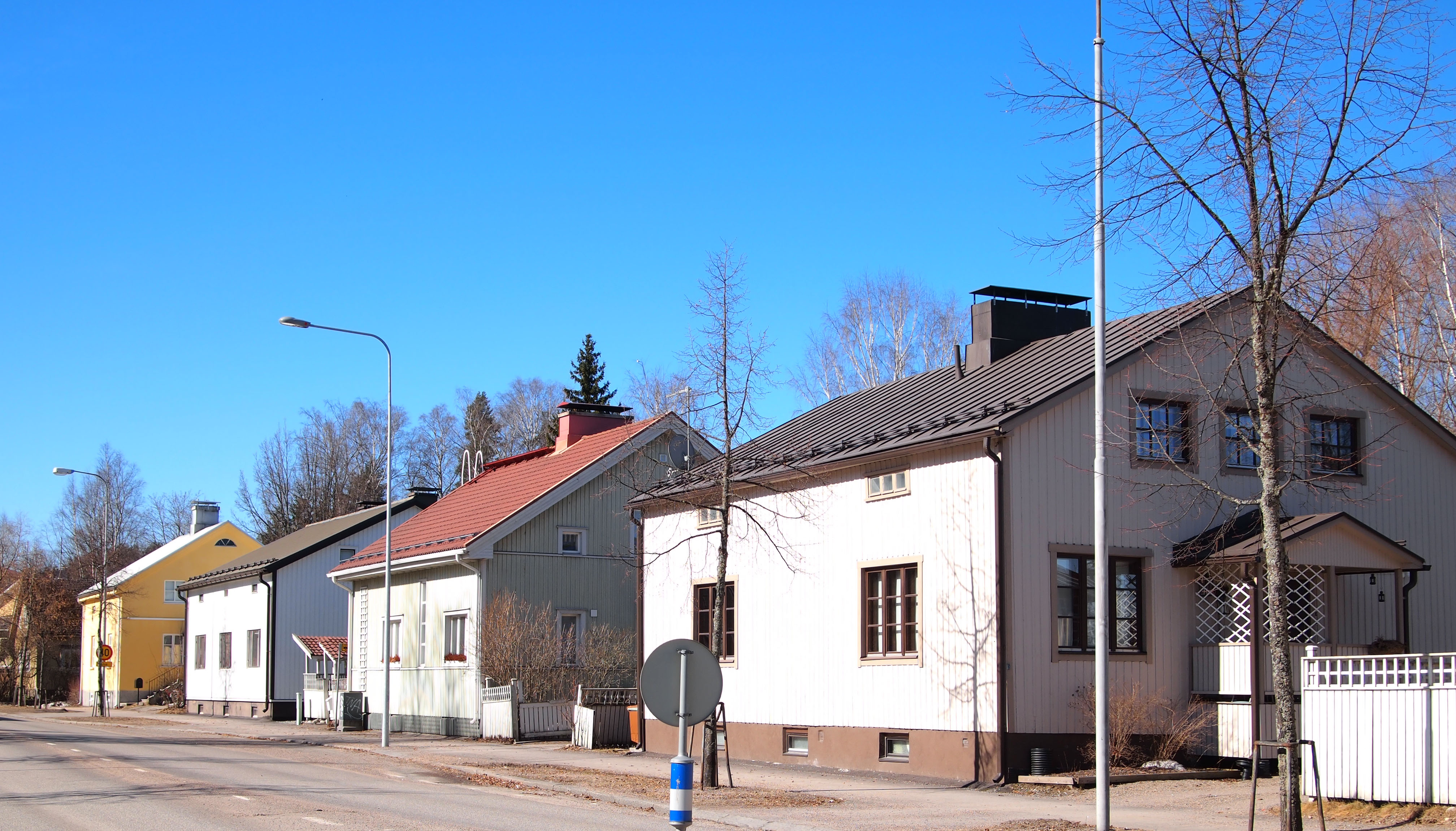
Single-family houses in Mäki-Matti.

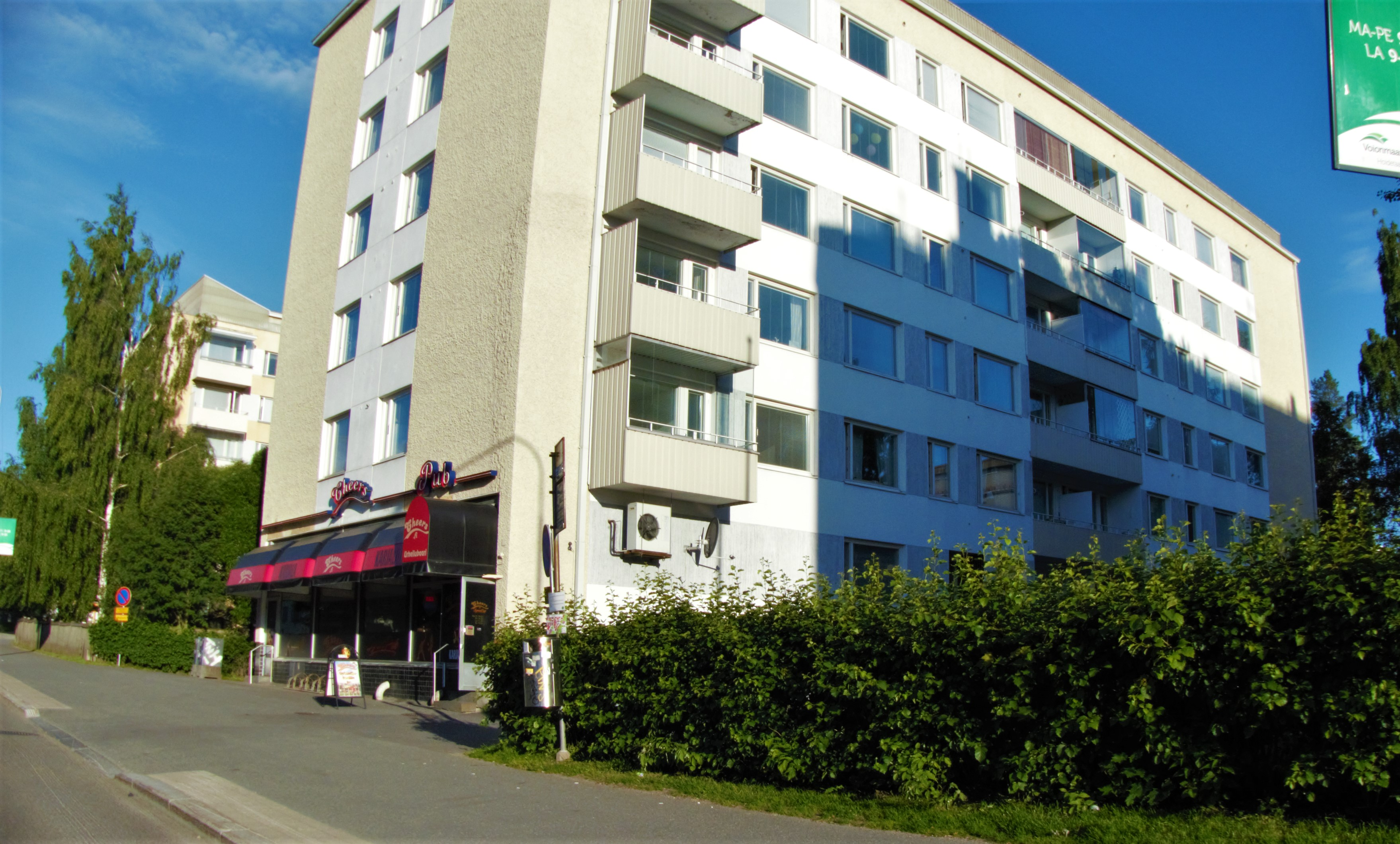
An apartment building and a pub on street Voionmaankatu.

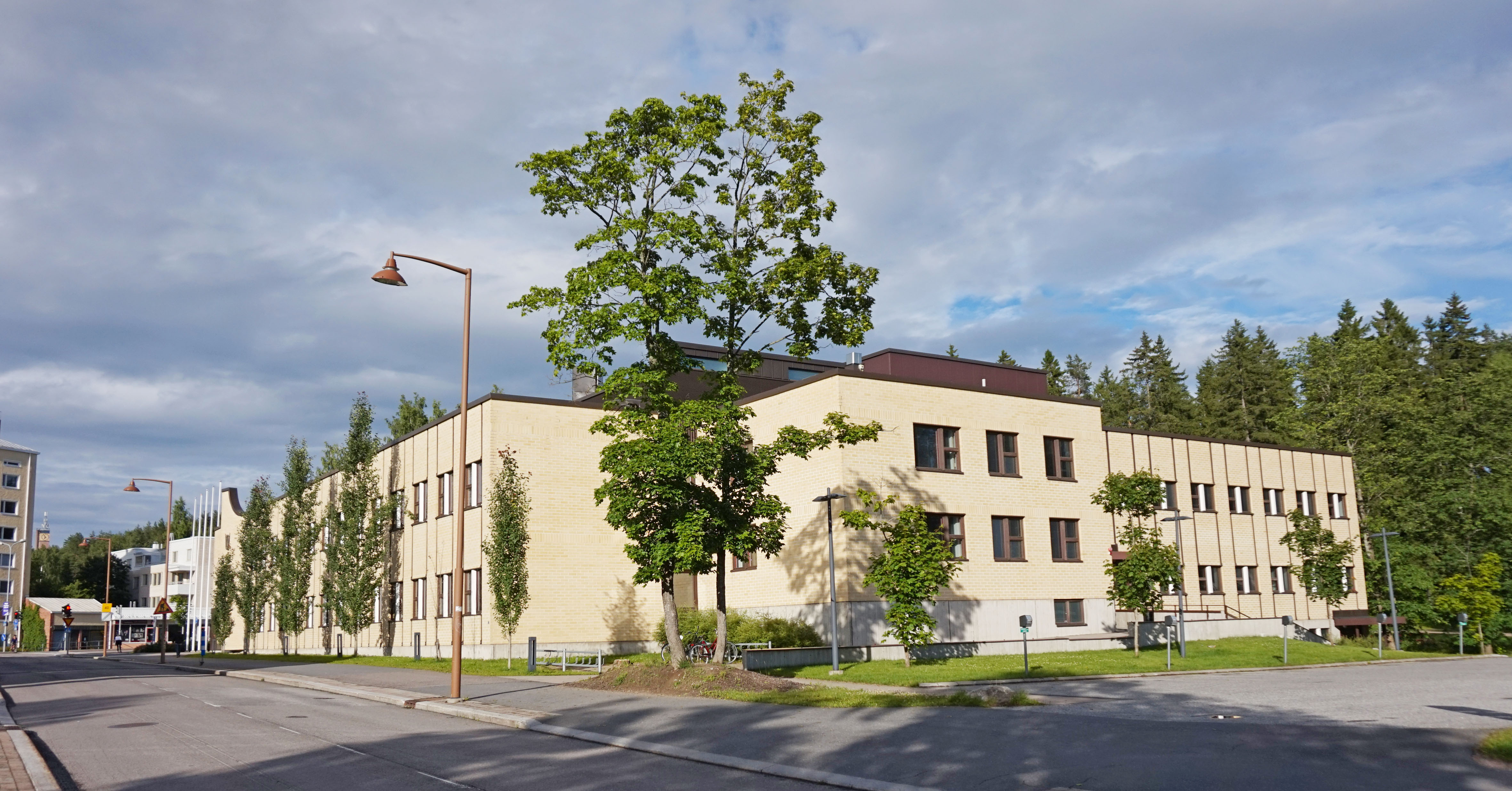
Finnish Music Campus

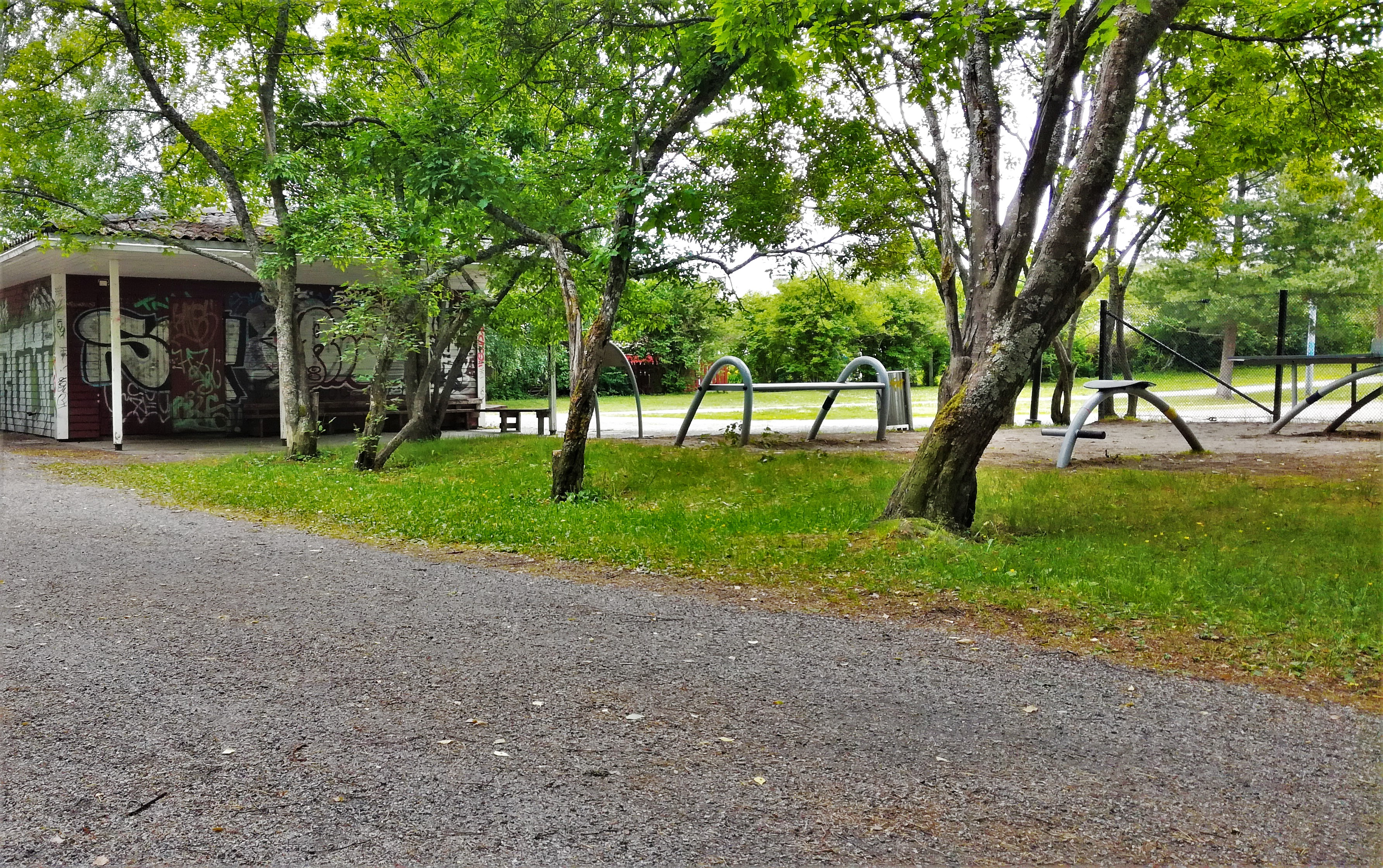
Vellamonpuisto is one of the parks in Mäki-Matti.

== Notable people ==
- Gettomasa, rapper
- Matti Nykänen, ski jumper
- Väinö Voionmaa, politician
