= Kantakaupunki, Jyväskylä =

Coordinates: 62°13′22″N 25°46′39″E

Kantakaupunki
- Ward of Jyväskylä
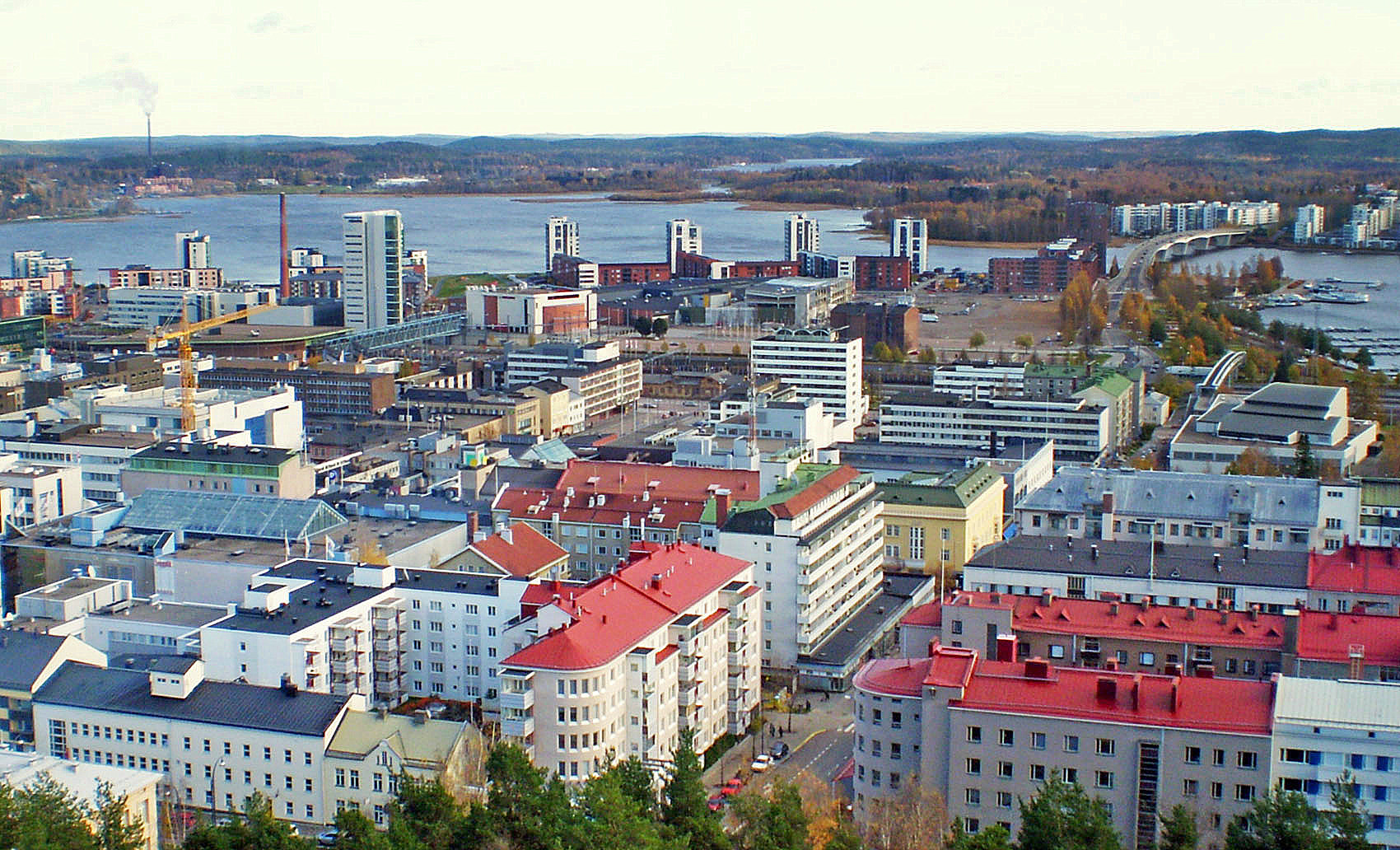
- Kantakaupunki seen from Harju
- Country: Finland
- Province: Western Finland
- Region: Central Finland
- Sub-region: Jyväskylä sub-region
- City: Jyväskylä
- Ward: Kantakaupunki

Population (2010)
  - Total: 25.149
- Time zone: UTC+2 (EET)
  - Summer (DST): UTC+3 (EEST)
- Postal code: 40100 JYVÄSKYLÄ

Kantakaupunki is a ward of Jyväskylä, Finland. Over 25.000 people live in Kantakaupunki. Keskusta, Puistola, Harju, Lutakko, Mattilanpelto, Mäki-Matti, Kukkumäki, Nisula, Taulumäki, Tourula and Mannila are districts of Kantakaupunki.

== Gallery ==
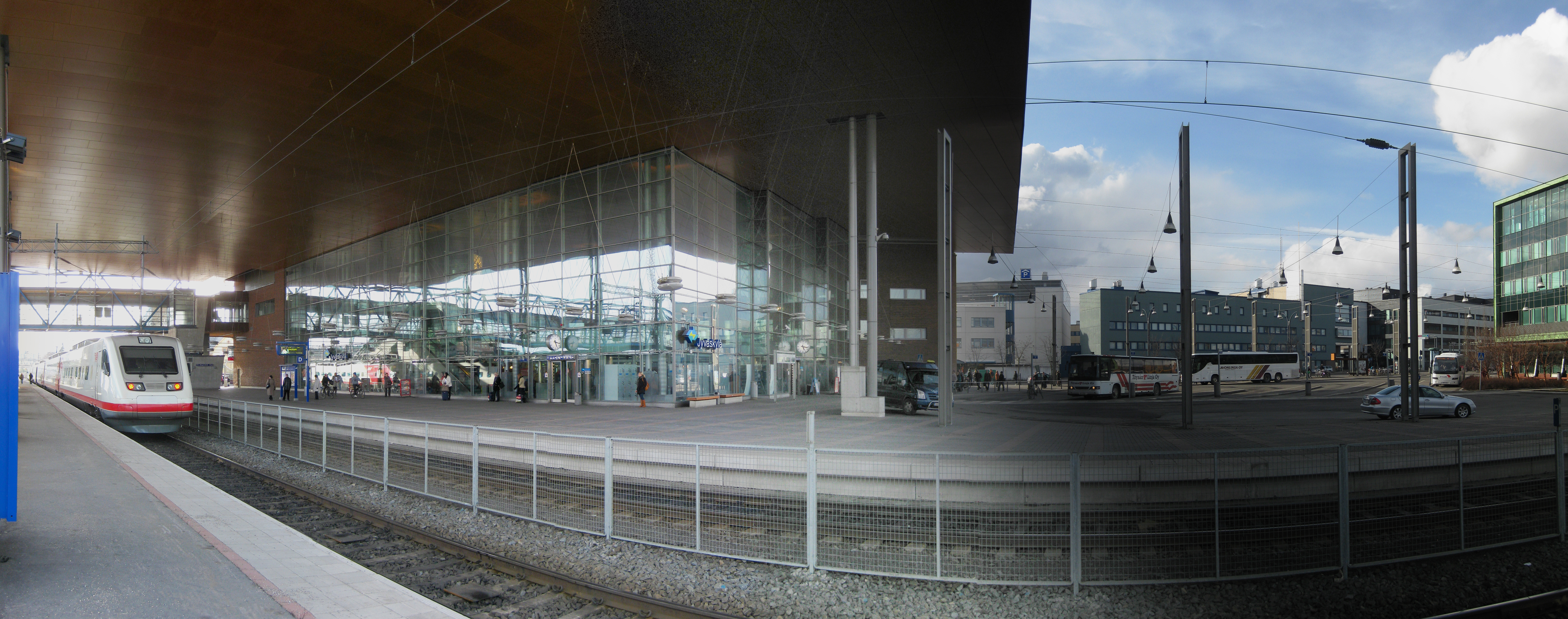
Matkakeskus

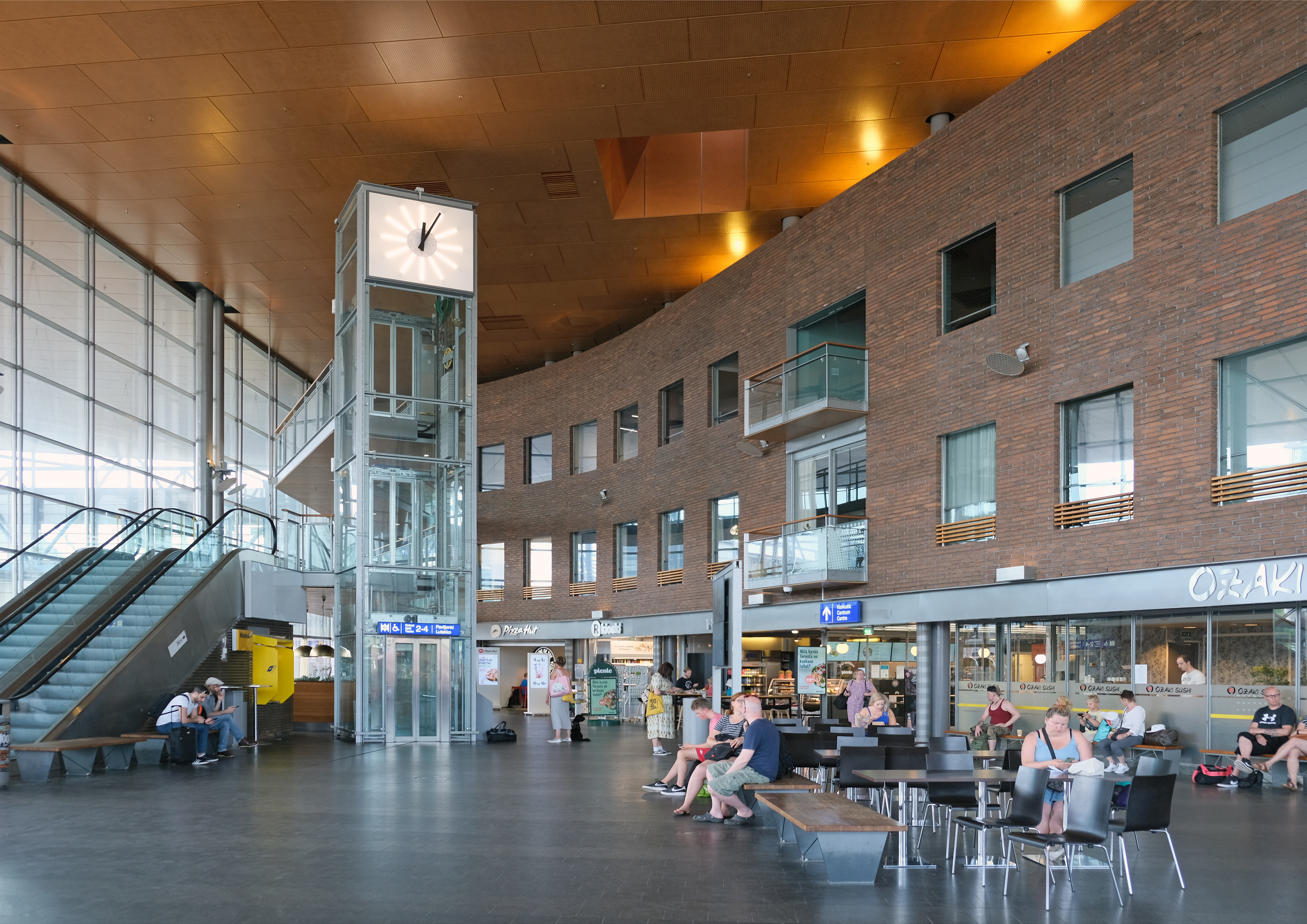
Railway Station Interior

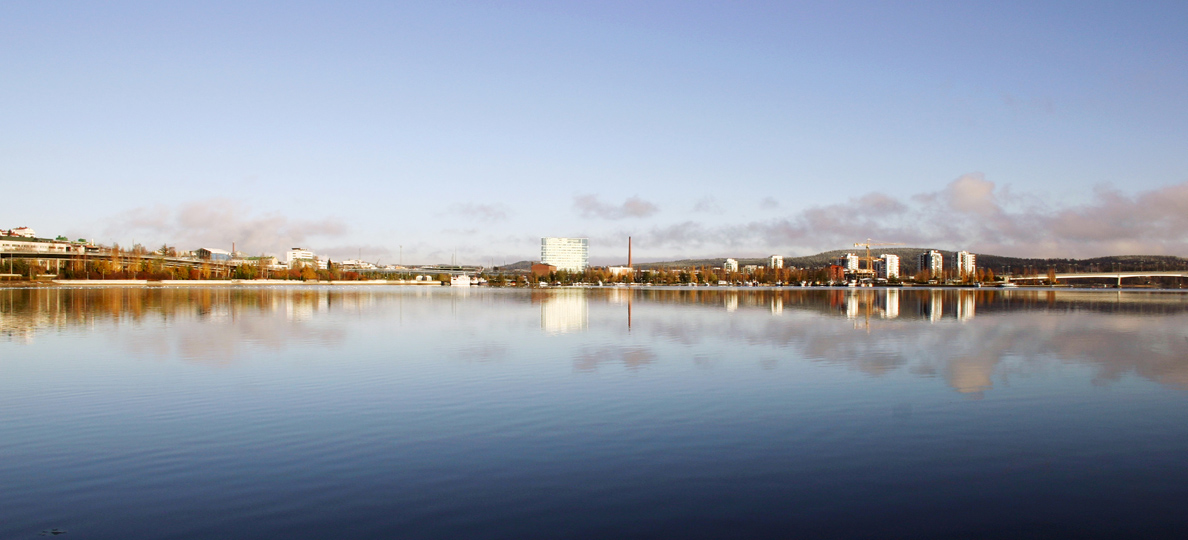
Kantakaupunki seen from Jyväsjärvi

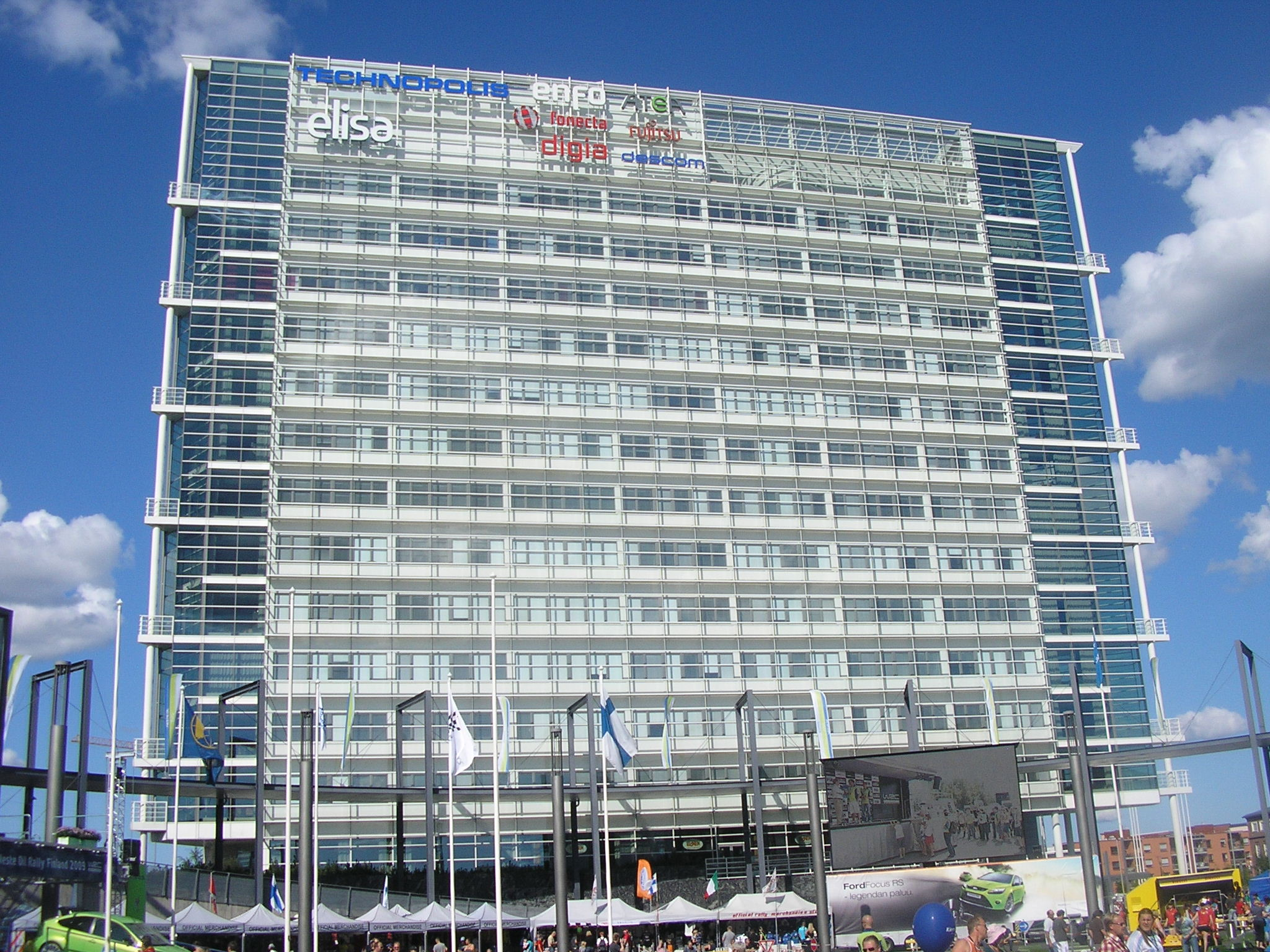
Innova Tower

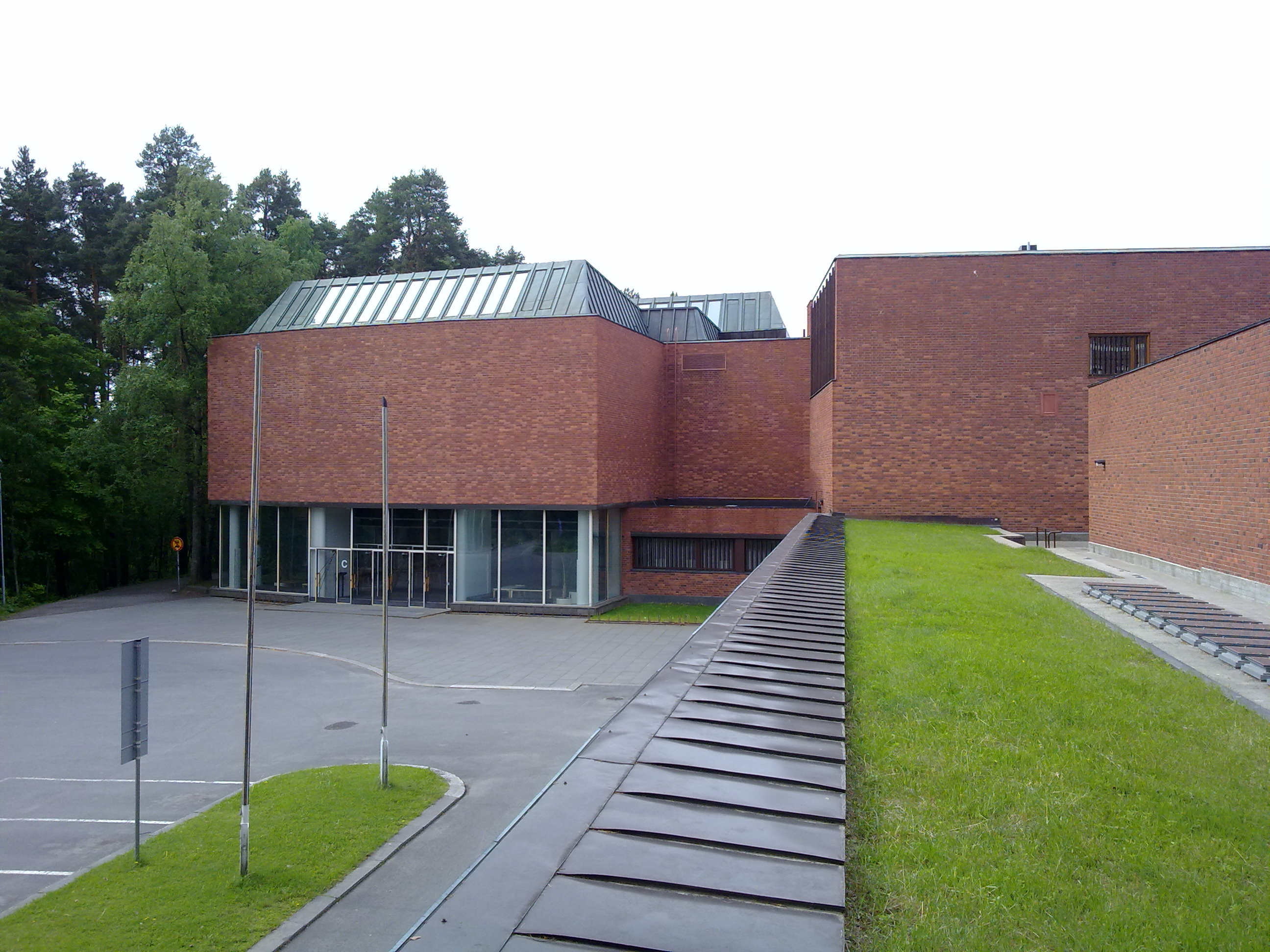
University, Seminaarinmäki Campus

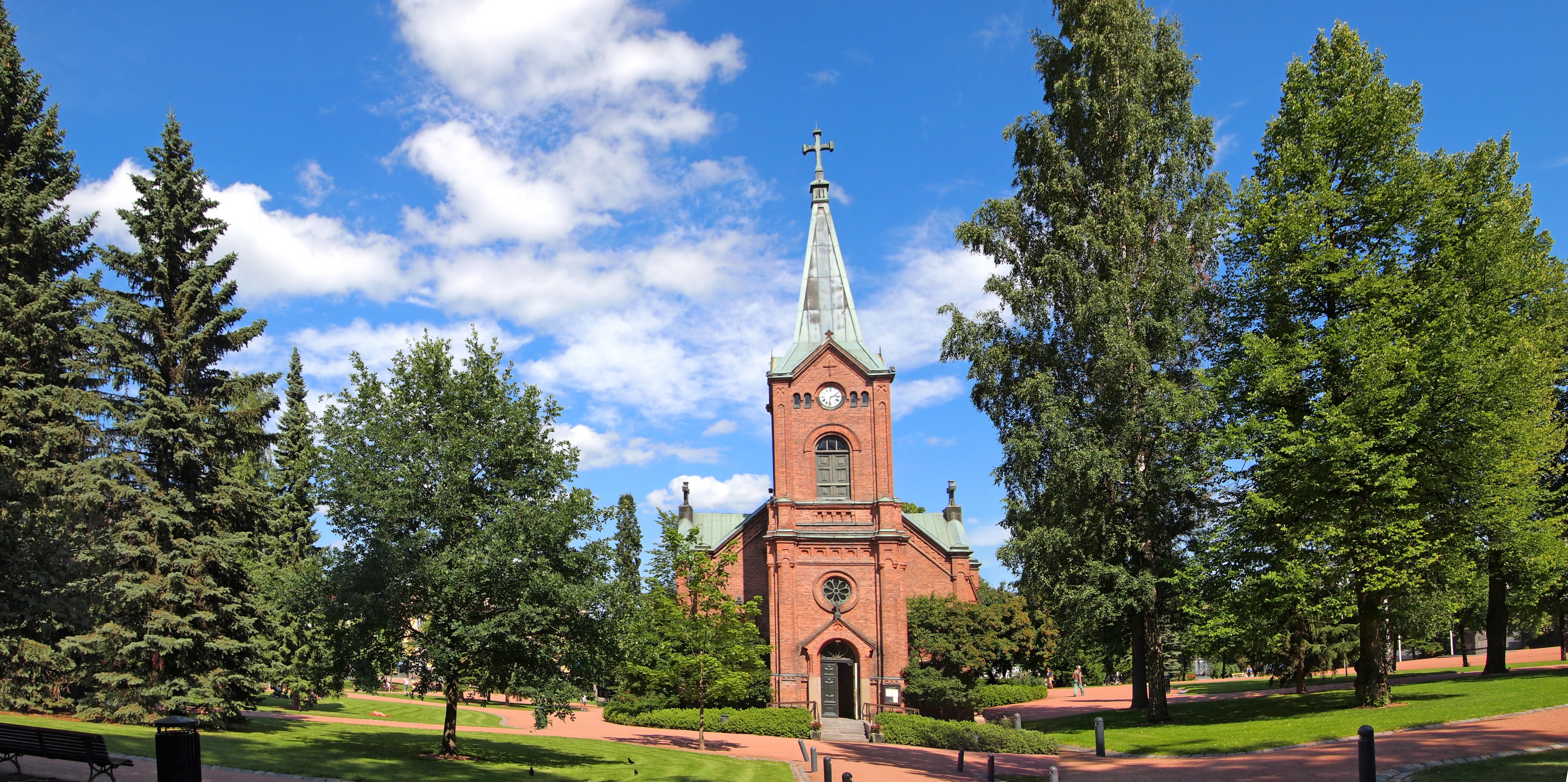
Jyväskylä City Church and Church Park

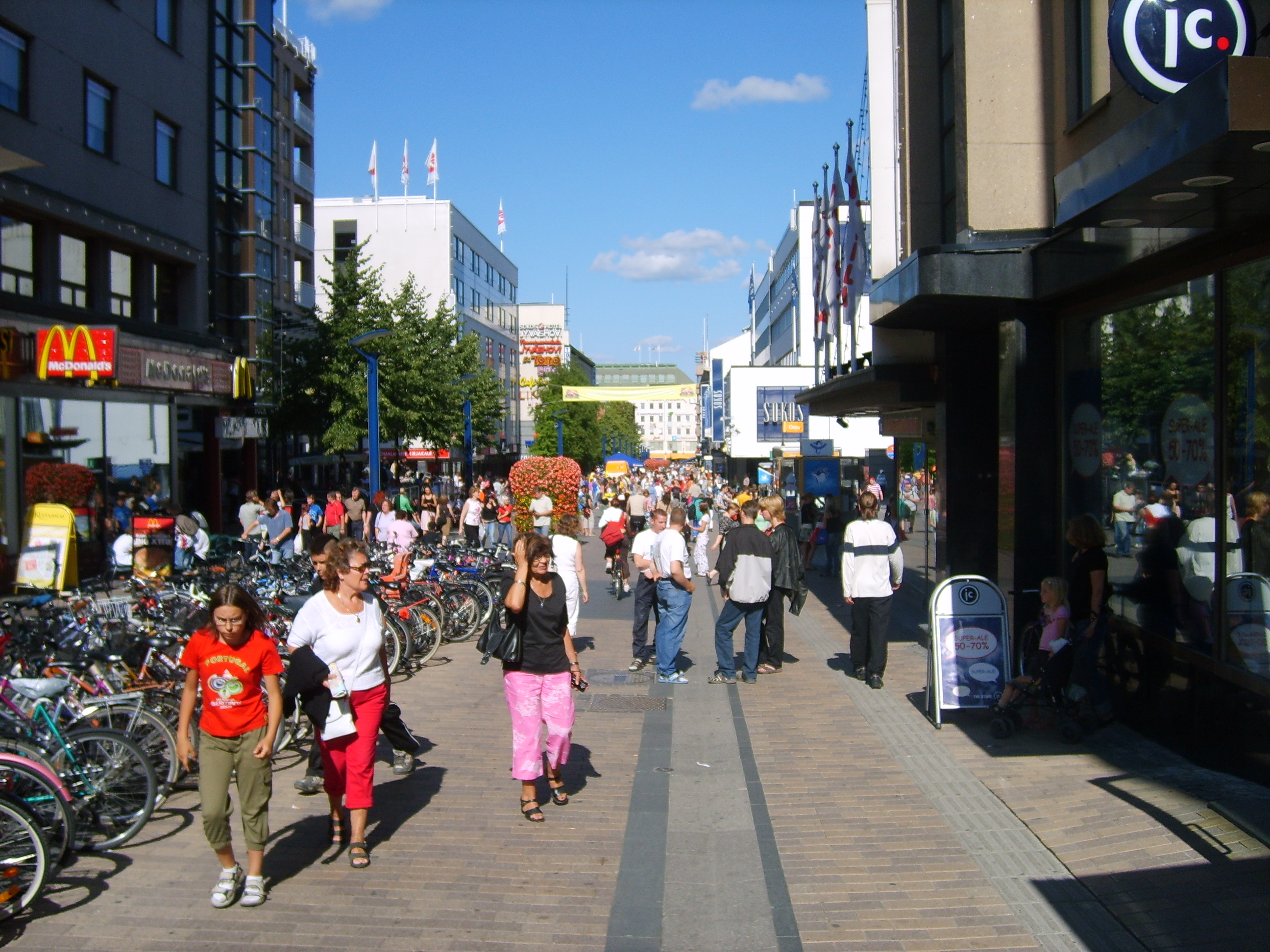
Kauppakatu

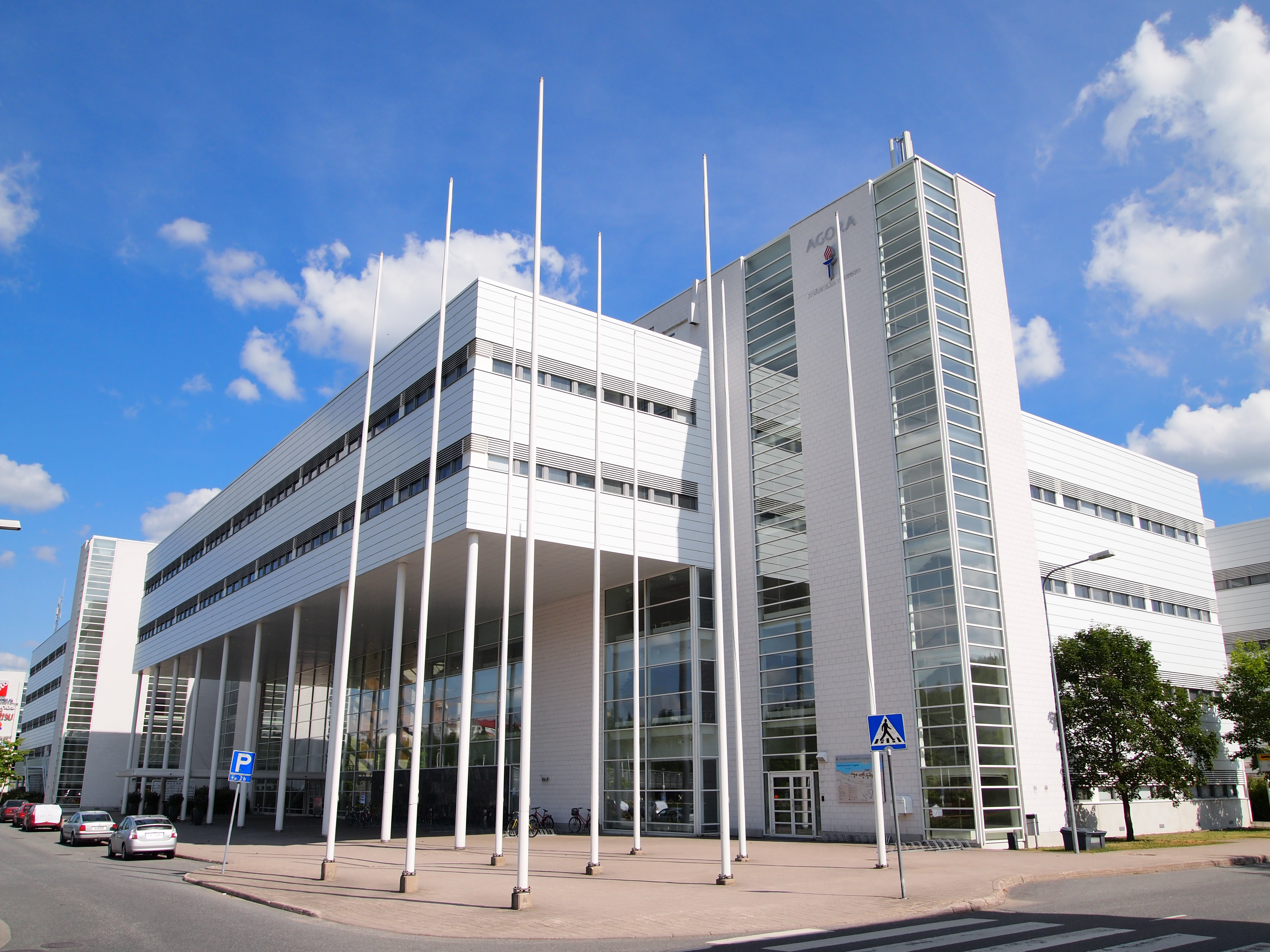
Agora Centre

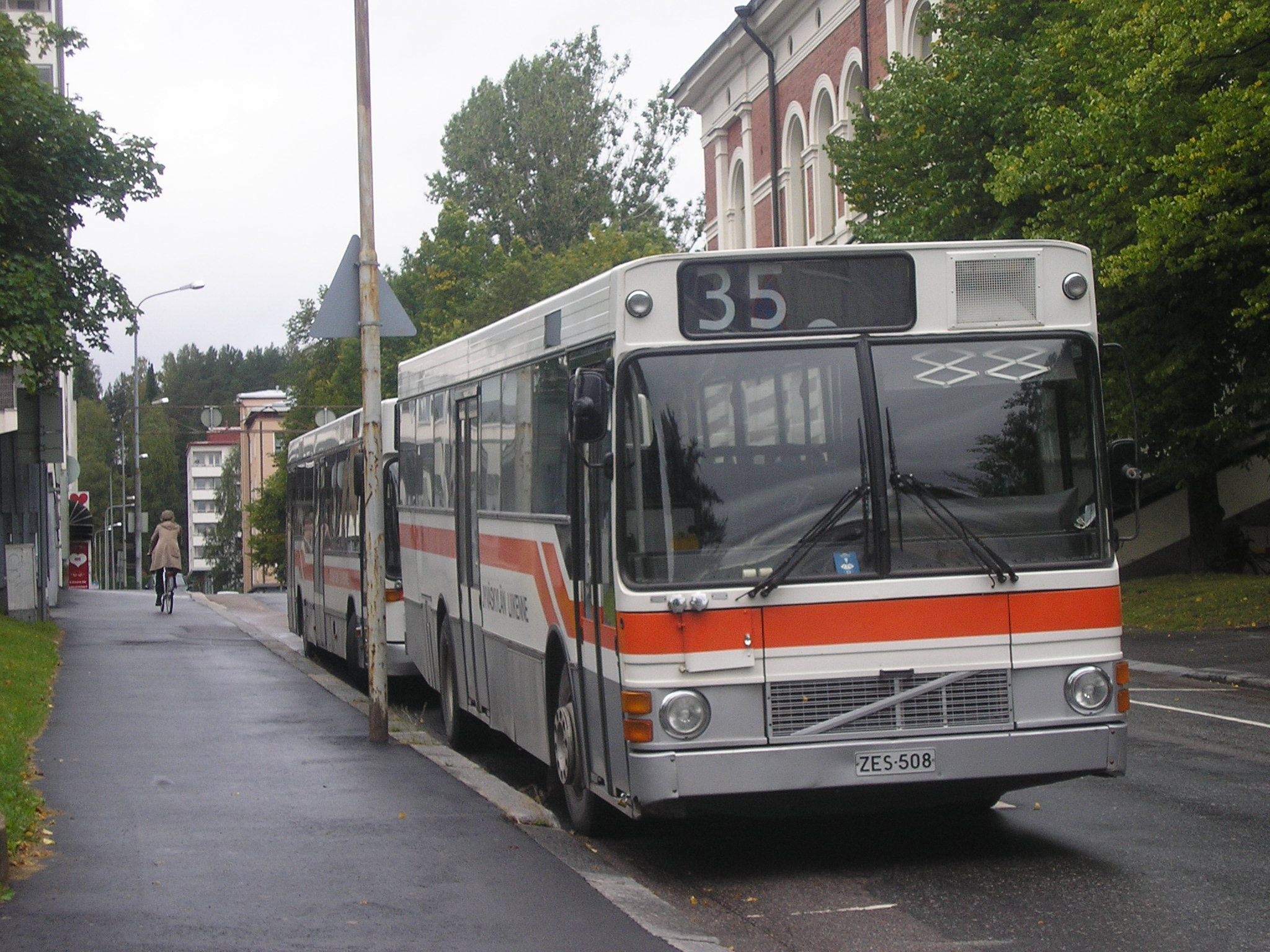
Buses in front of the City Hall

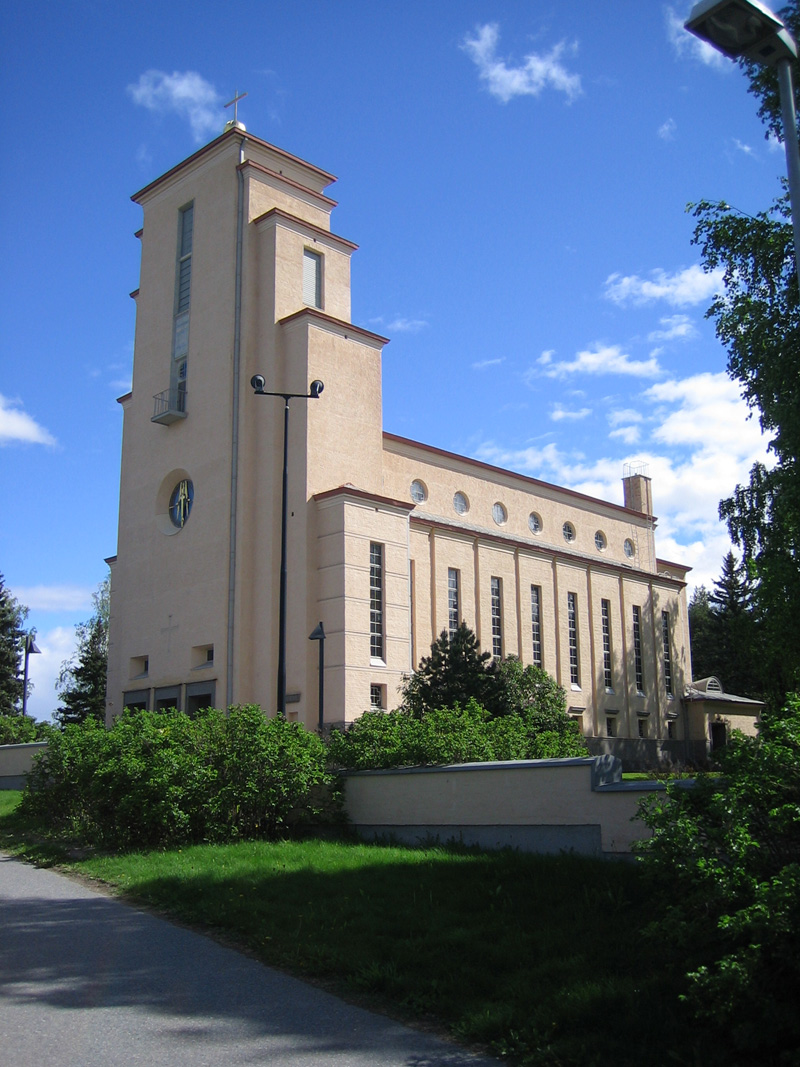
Taulumäki Church

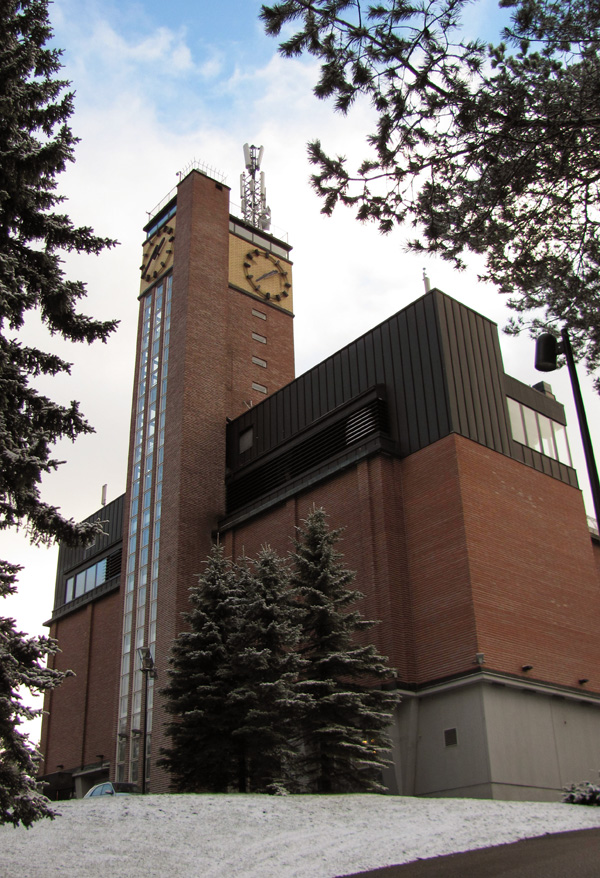
Vesilinna

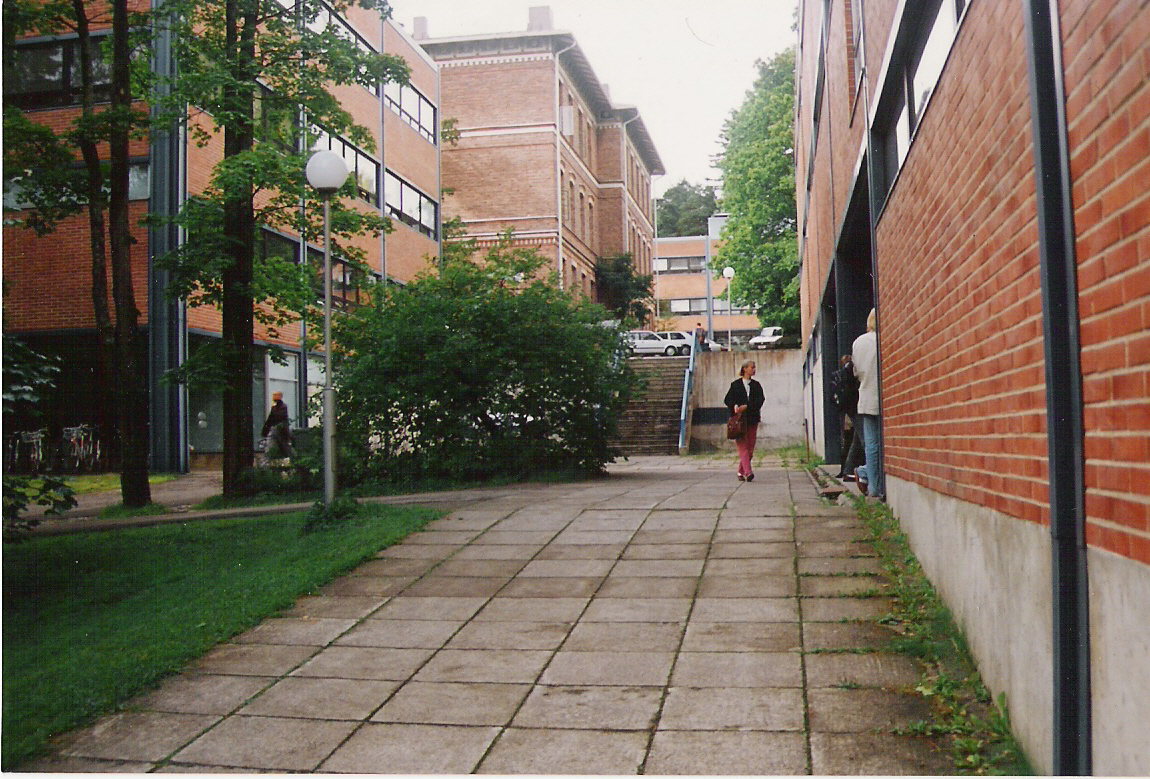
Seminaarinmäki

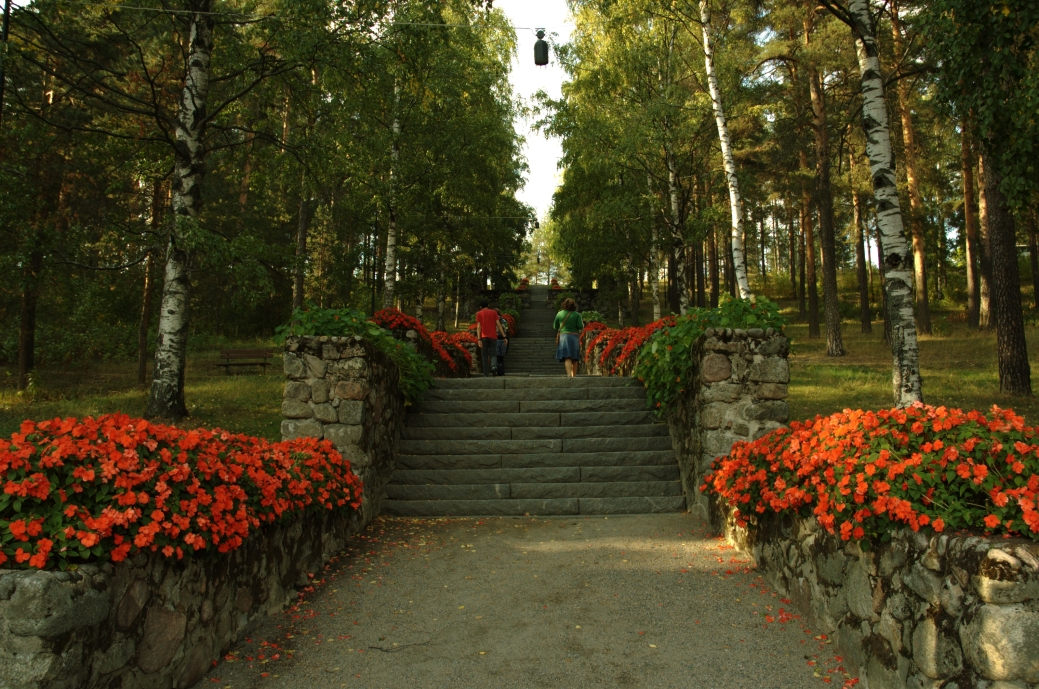
Harju Stairs

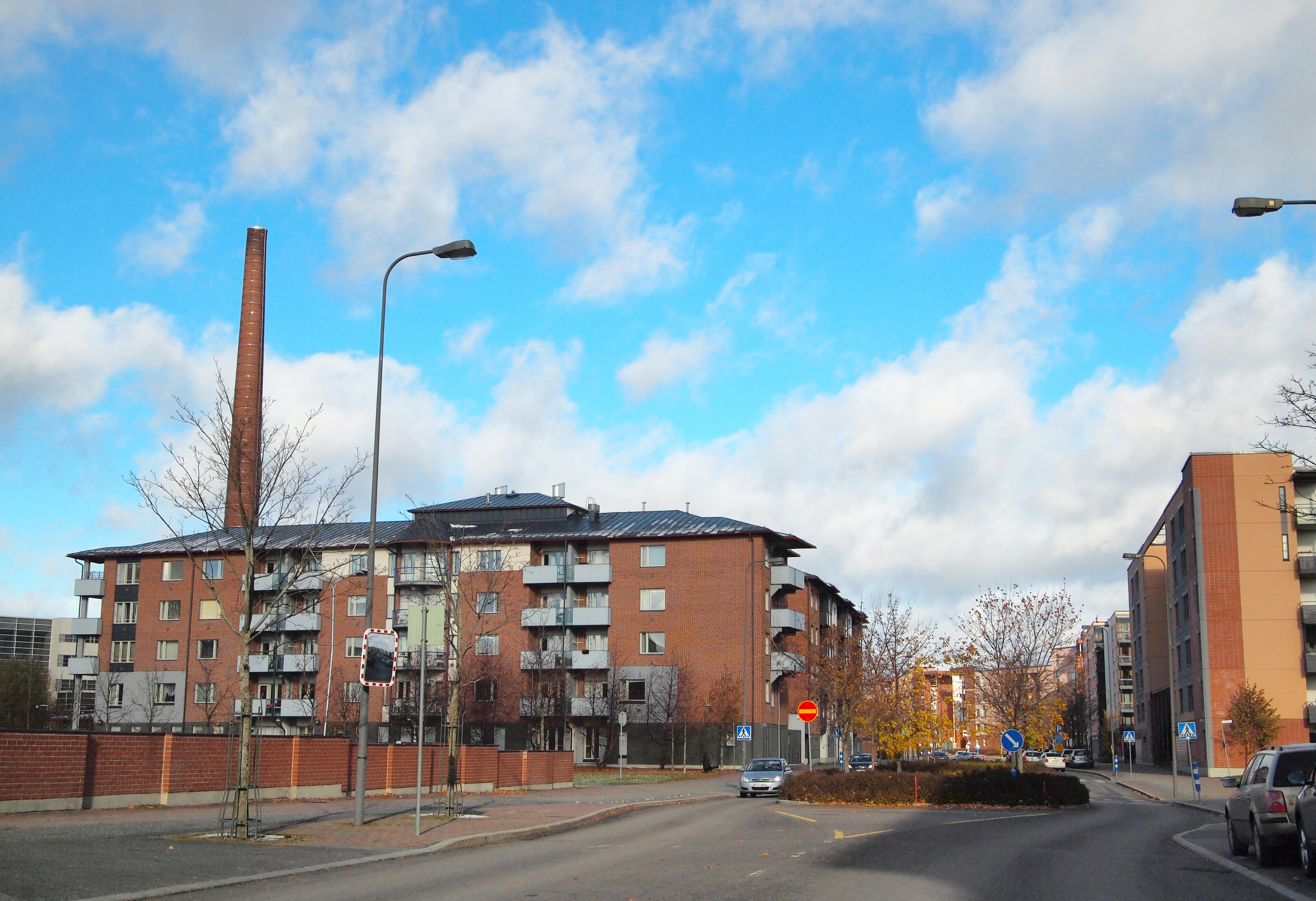
A street in Lutakko

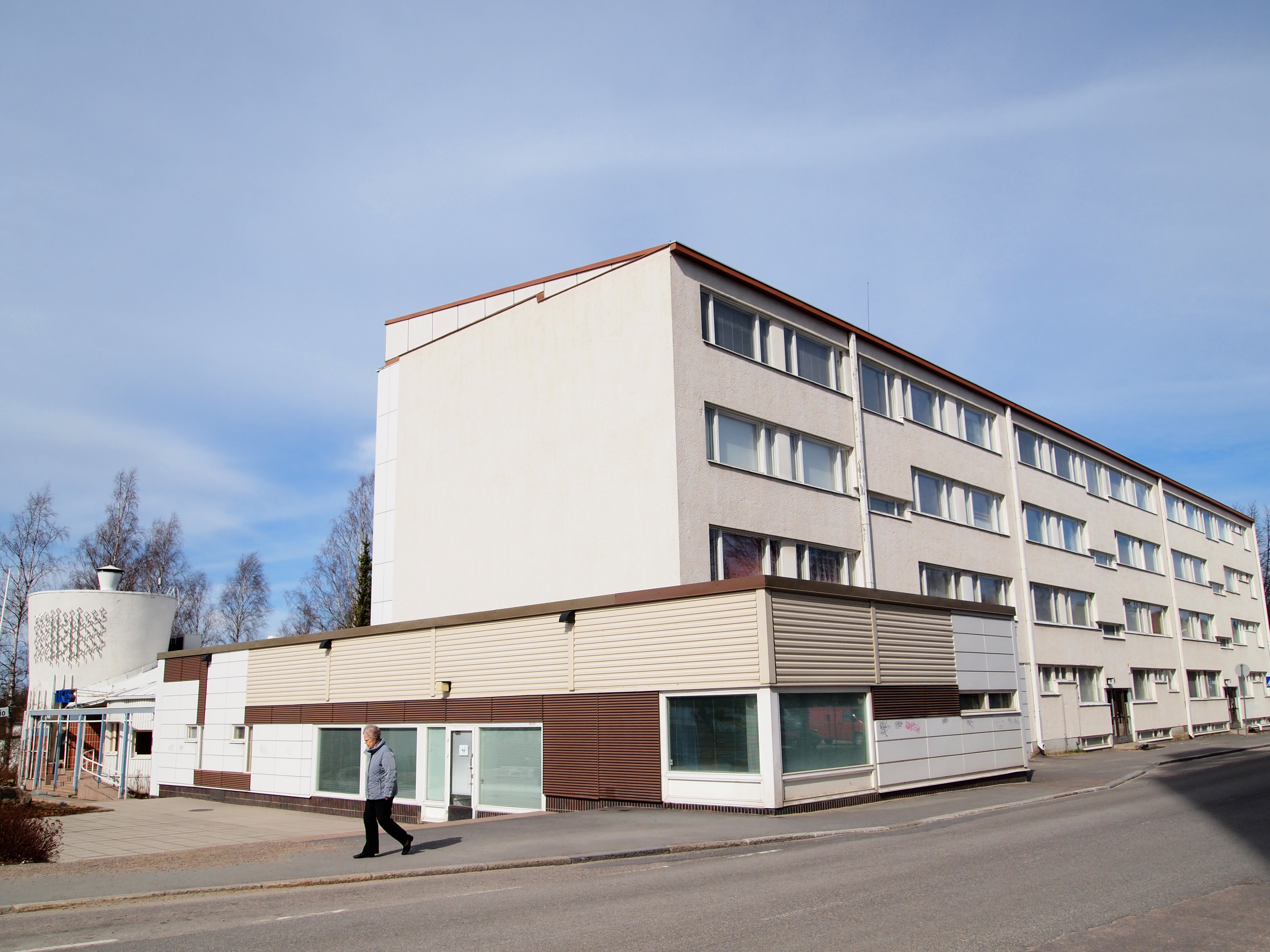
Viitaniemi neighborhood
