= Ottava =

Ottava may refer to:

- Ottava rima, an Italian rhyming stanza.
- In music, an octave. Particularly in the following musical instructions:
  - All' ottava alta (8va, also ottava sopra), transpose music up one octave
  - All' ottava bassa (8vb, also ottava sotta), transpose music down one octave
  - Coll' ottava, double at the octave

== See also ==
- Otava (disambiguation)
