= Otava =

Otava may refer to:

- Otava (island), in the Baltic Sea
- Otava Group, a Finnish media group that owns e.g. Suomalainen Kirjakauppa and:
  - Otava (publisher), a Finnish book publishing company
  - Otavamedia, a Finnish magazine publishing company that publishes e.g. Hymy
- Otava (river), in the Czech Republic
- Otava (village), in Finland
- 4405 Otava, an asteroid
- Hotel Otava, in Pori, Finland
- Zdeněk Otava (1902–1980), Czech opera singer
- a Finnish name for the asterism Big Dipper

== See also ==
- Ottava (disambiguation)
- Ottawa (disambiguation)
