= R-kioski =

Finnish chain of convenience stores

Reitan Convenience Finland Ltd.
- Formerly: R-kioski Oy
- Type: Private
- Founded: 1910 (Reitan Convenience Finland Ltd.: 2011)
- Headquarters: Espoo, Finland
- Number of locations: 270 (Finland 2026); 91 (Estonia 2025)
- Area served: Finland; Estonia
- Key people: Niklas Lilius (CEO)
- Products: Retail
- Revenue: €221 M (2024)
- Owner: Reitan Convenience
- Parent: Reitan Group
- Website: www.reitanconvenience.fi

R-kioski is a chain of convenience stores that are run by Reitan Convenience Finland Ltd. which belong to the Reitan Group. There are around 270 R-kioski stores across Finland as of 2026. R-kioski's focus is on selling take-away food and drinks but they also provide services such as the various "Veikkaus" lottery games (and in most stores, slot machines), prepaid SIM cards, postal and parcel services, as well as the sale of public transport tickets. Most stores are also able to sell national rail and bus transport tickets.

The company slogan is "Tekee hetkessä hyvää" (makes good in a moment).

== History ==
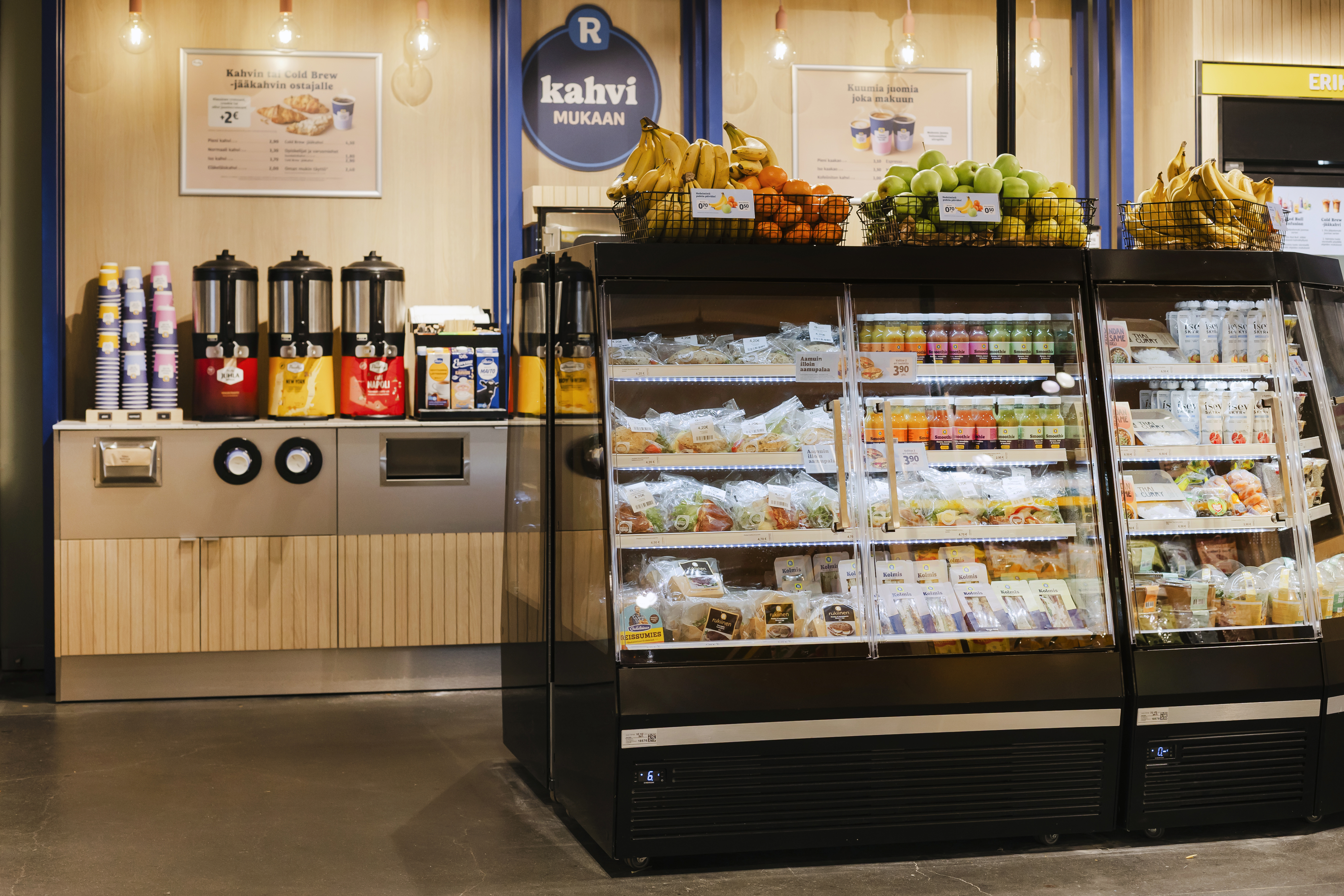
Elielinaukion R-kioski 2025

The company dates back to 1910. The business was originally conceived by several major Finnish publishing houses as a newsagent for railway stations ("Rautakirja" was itself shortened from "Rautatiekirjakauppa" which translates to "railway bookshop"). It was later extended to other venues and products. The name R-kioski was adopted in 1958.

On 5 March 2012, it was announced that the Reitan Group bought R-kioski from Sanoma for roughly 130 million euros. The group had been working on the purchase for a decade, but previous negotiations had stranded as R-kioski had demanded a merger where they owned 51 percent. The purchase brought the Reitan Group to 2,500 kiosk outlets, making it the second-largest kiosk group in Europe. The company also previously operated in Romania between 2008 and 2011, but sold its operations to R-kioski Romania CEO Dan Vasile in April 2011. The name R-kioski was to be abandoned in Romania after a grace period following the corporate acquisition.

In October 2021, R-kioski opened its first automated convenience store called R-kioski Go! in front of the Viikki Campus of the University of Helsinki. In June 2023, R-Kioski moved its head office to the Alberga Business Park in the Leppävaara district of Espoo.. As of September 2025 the CEO of the company has been Niklas Lilius. The company changed its name from R-kioski Oy to Reitan Convenience Finland Oy 18.5.2026.

Former company slogans include "Kaiken lisäksi lähellä" (To top it off, it's near by), "Äkkiä R-kioskille" (Swiftly to R-kioski), "R-kioskilla kaikki käy" (We accept everything at R-kioski or Everyone visits R-kioski) and "R-Kioski — Sellaisena kuin sinä haluat" (R-Kioski — as you want it). The newest slogan "Tekee hetkessä hyvää" was adopted in 2024.

== Gallery ==
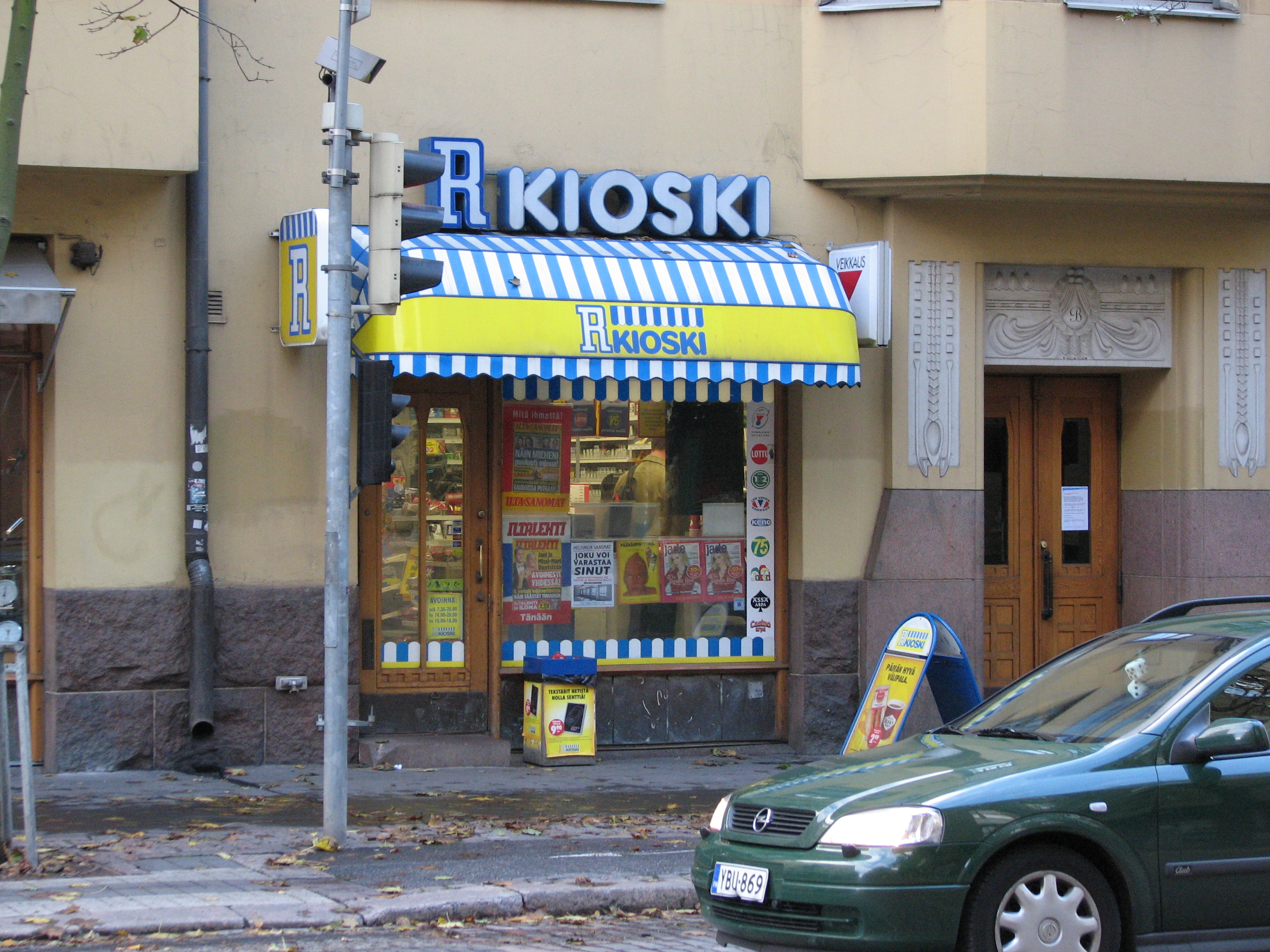
A R-kioski on Bulevardi in Helsinki with the old logo in 2006

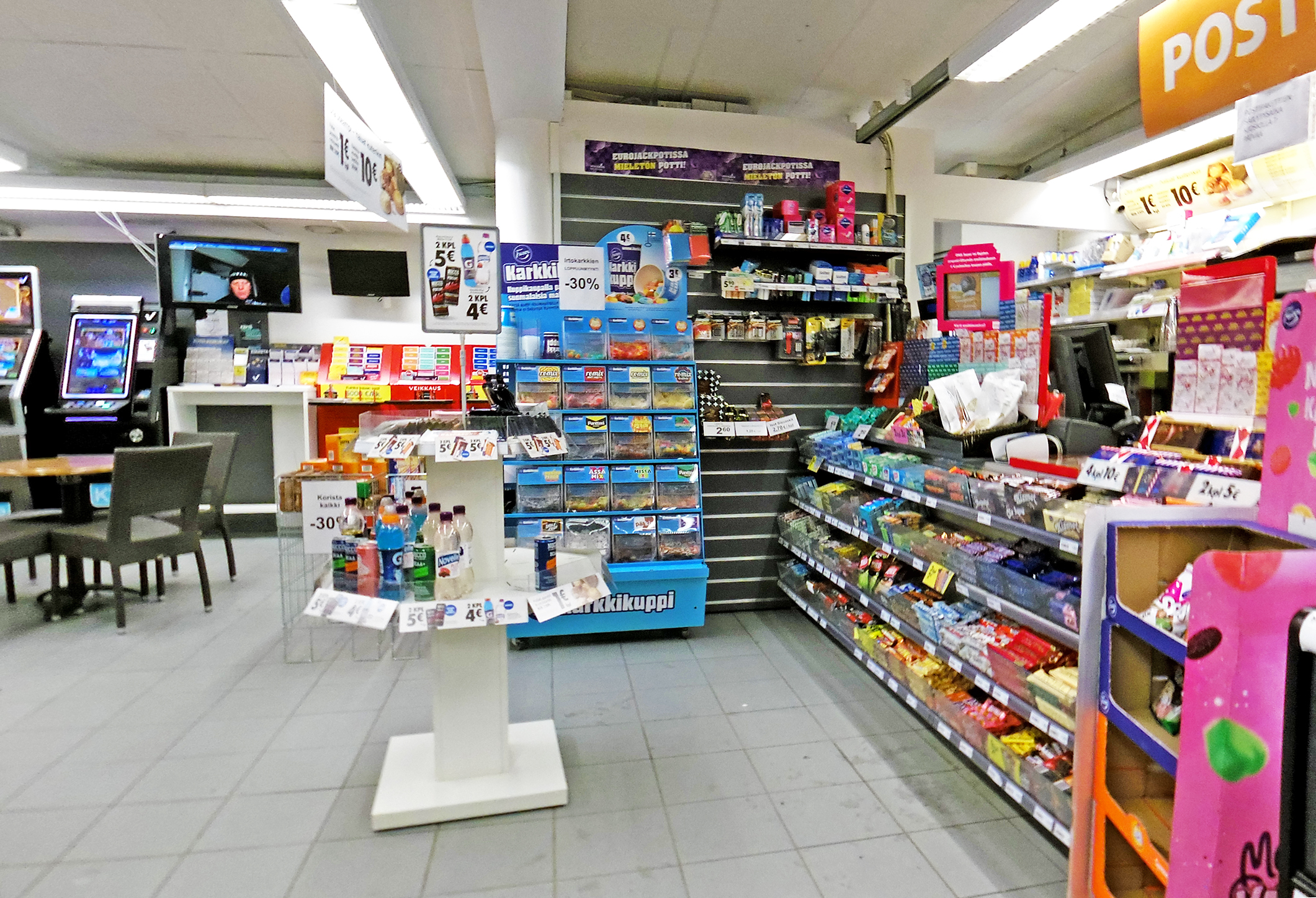
Interior of a R-kioski in Jyväskylä. The Veikkaus lottery game counter and slot machines are on the far-left of this picture

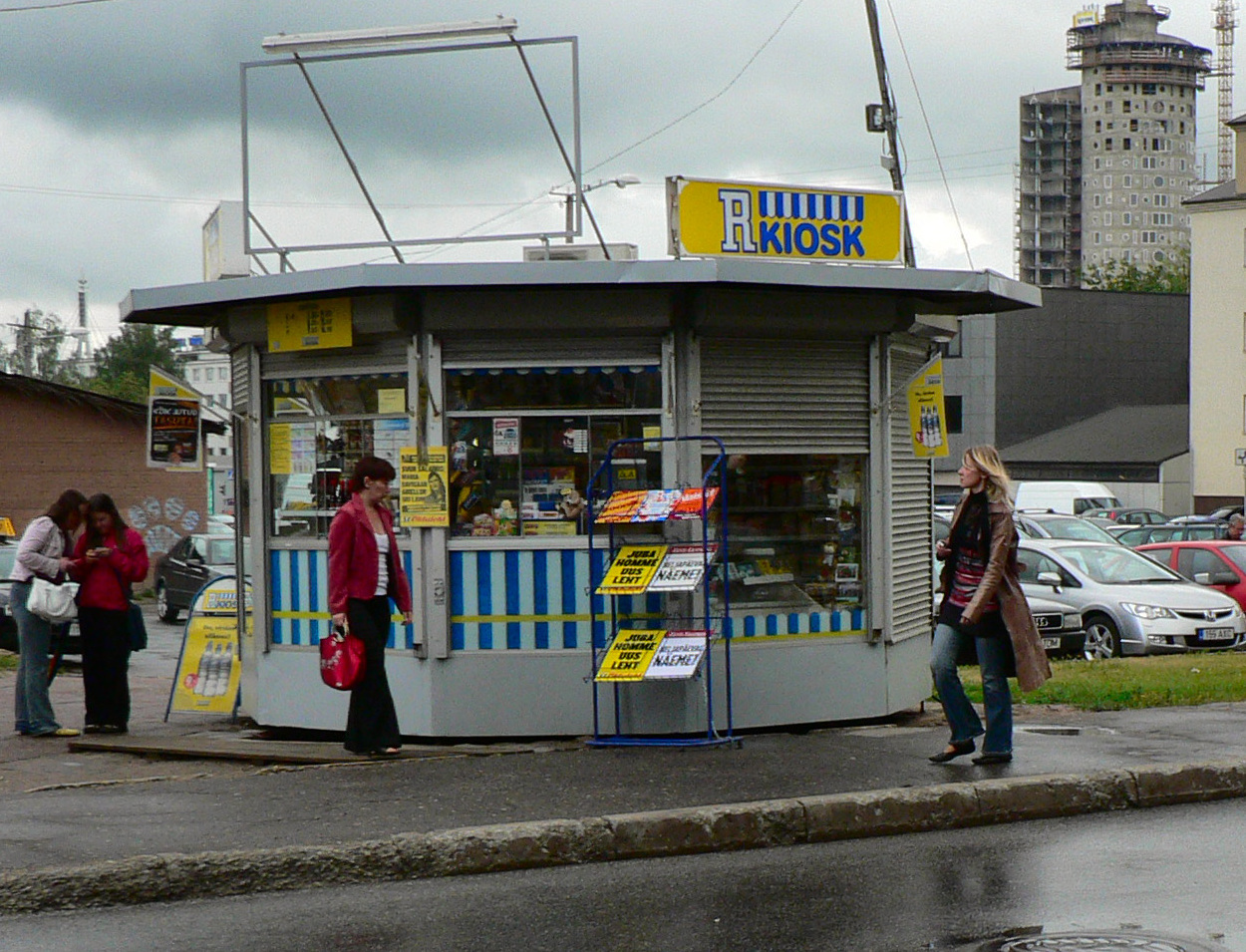
R-kiosk in Aleksandri Street, Tartu, Estonia in 2007

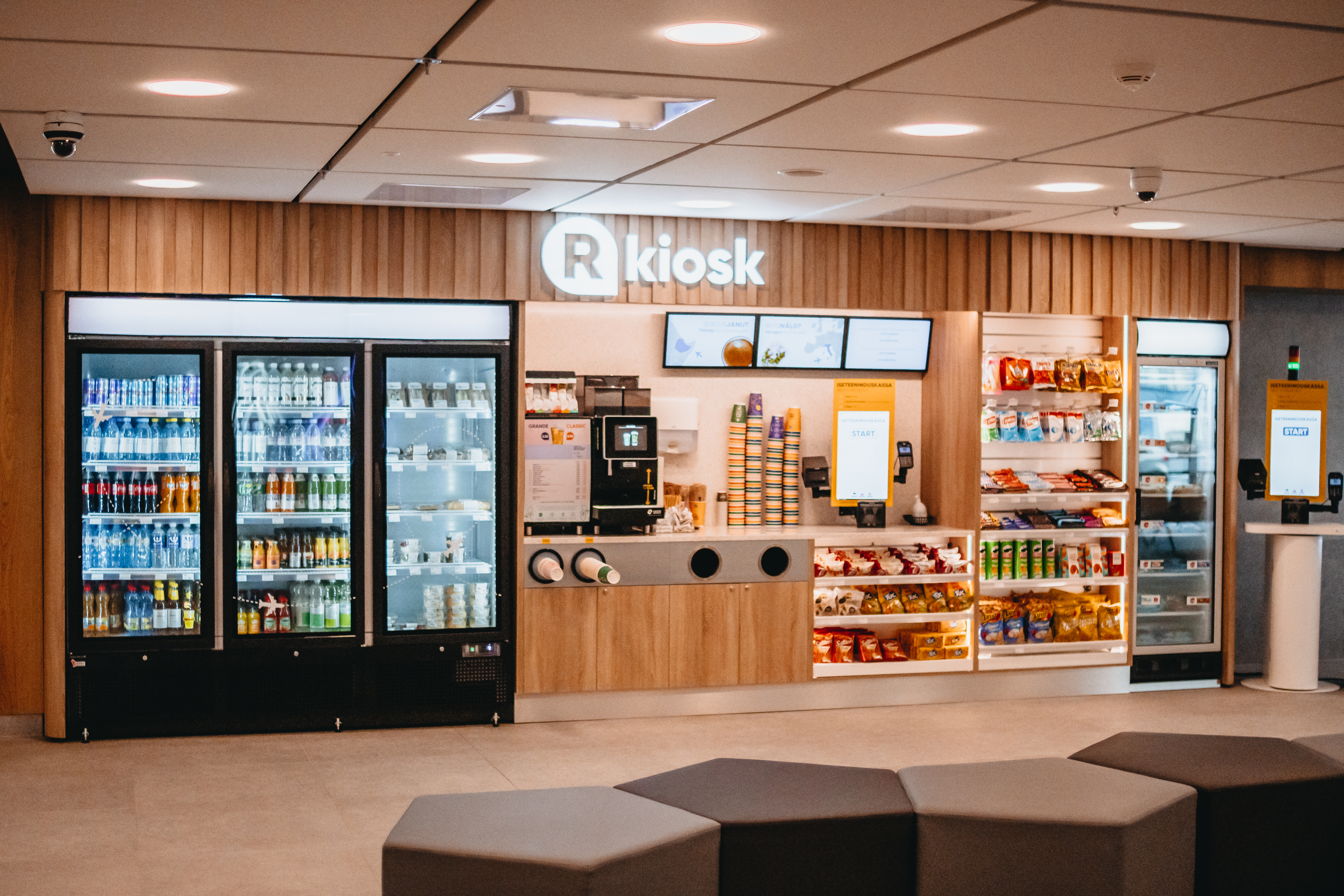
R-kiosk in Tallinn, Estonia in 2022

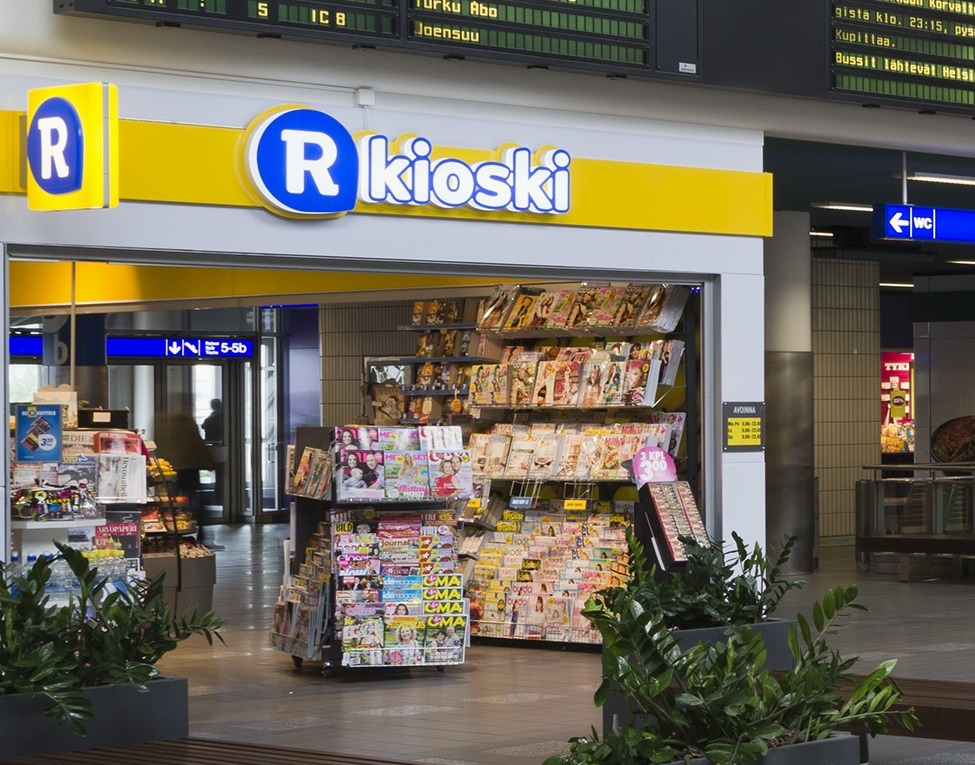
R-kioski in Pasila railway station, Finland, 2014

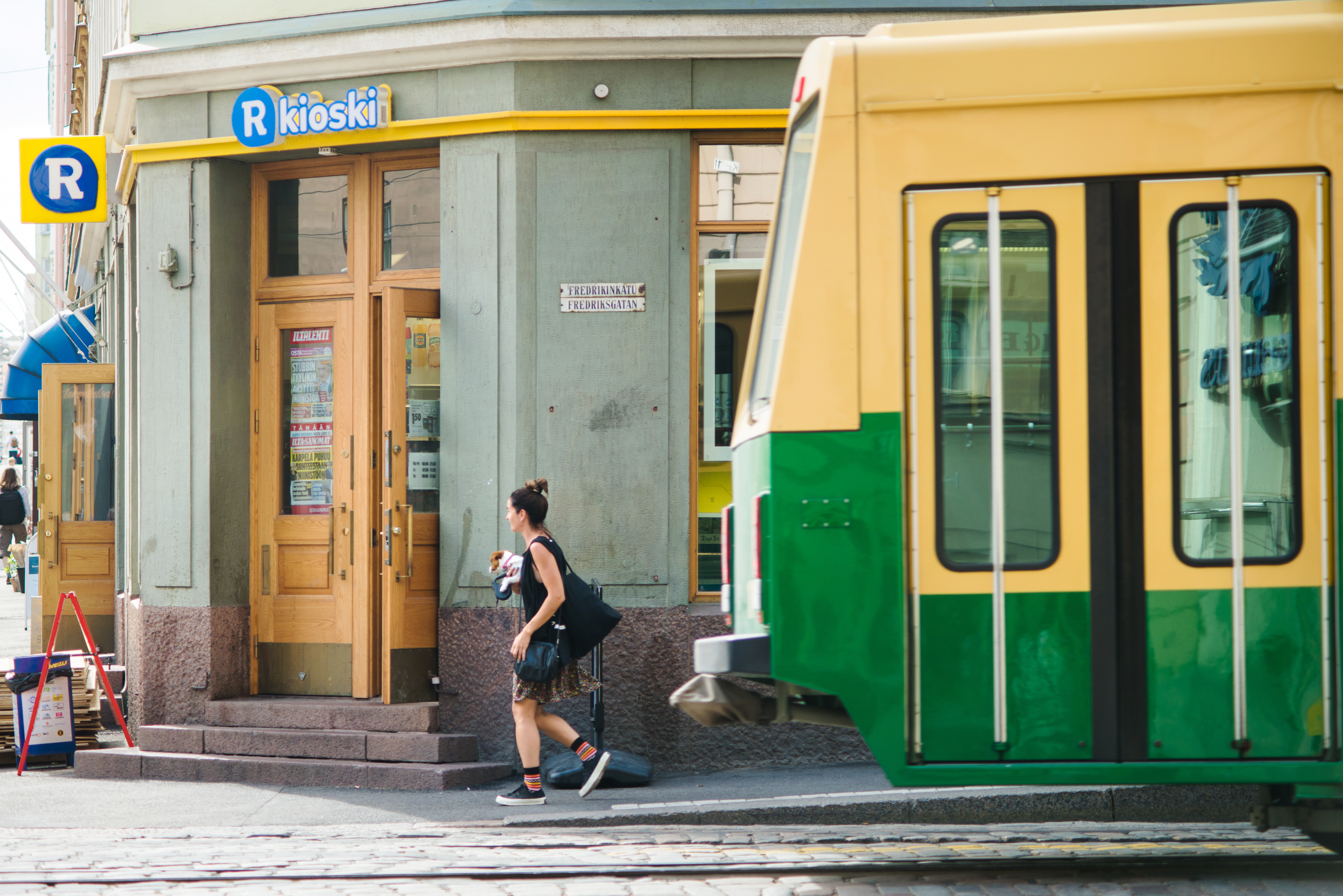
R-kioski Viiskulma year 2024

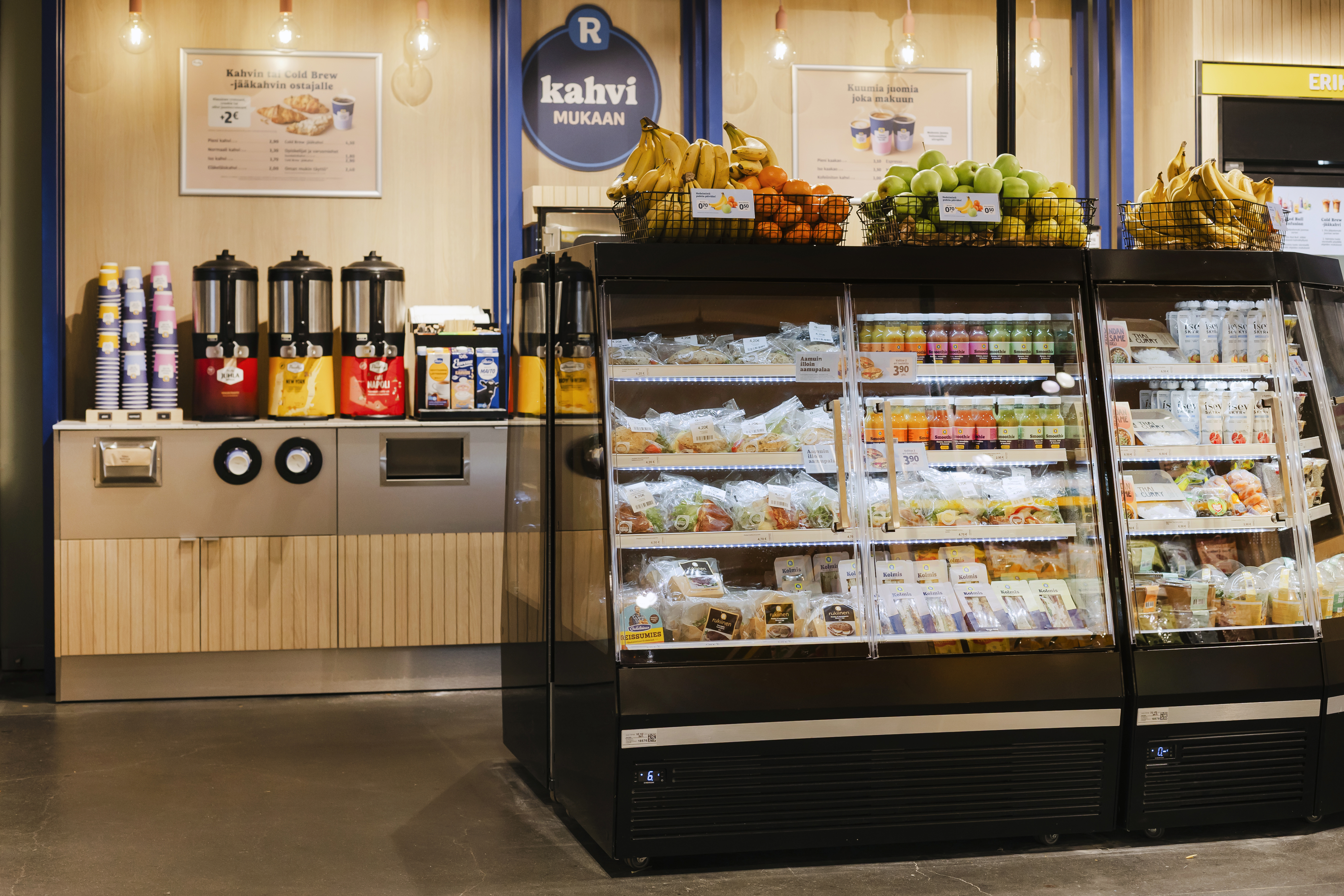
Elielinaukion R-kioski 2025

== Notes ==
- "R-kioski Oy / Yrityshaku / Taloussanomat" (in Finnish). Sanoma Media Finland Oy / Taloussanomat. 2014.
- Veera Honkanen (2014). "R-kioski ei muutu 7-Eleveniksi, ainakaan nimeltään" (in Finnish). Sanoma Media Finland Oy / Taloussanomat.
- "Yritys / R-kioski" (in Finnish). R-kioski. 2017.
- "R-kiosk" (in Estonian). R-kiosk. 2014.
- ""R-Kiosk" ir "Lietuvos spaudos" kioskai pasiūlys nemokamą internetą" (in Lithuanian). Verslo žinios. 2013.
- "R-kioskit katoavat Romaniasta" (in Finnish). Talentum Media Oy. 2011.
- "Reitan Servicehandel acquires R-kioski in Finland, Estonia and Lithuania". Reuters. 2011. Archived from the original on 2014-12-27.
- "Blir Europas nest største kioskselskap". Dagens Næringsliv (in Norwegian). 5 March 2012. Archived from the original on 7 March 2012.
