= Nisula =

Nisula may refer to:

- Nisula, Michigan, an unincorporated community in Houghton County, Michigan
- Maila Nisula (1931–2023), Finnish gymnast
