= Huhtasuo (ward) =

- Ward of Jyväskylä
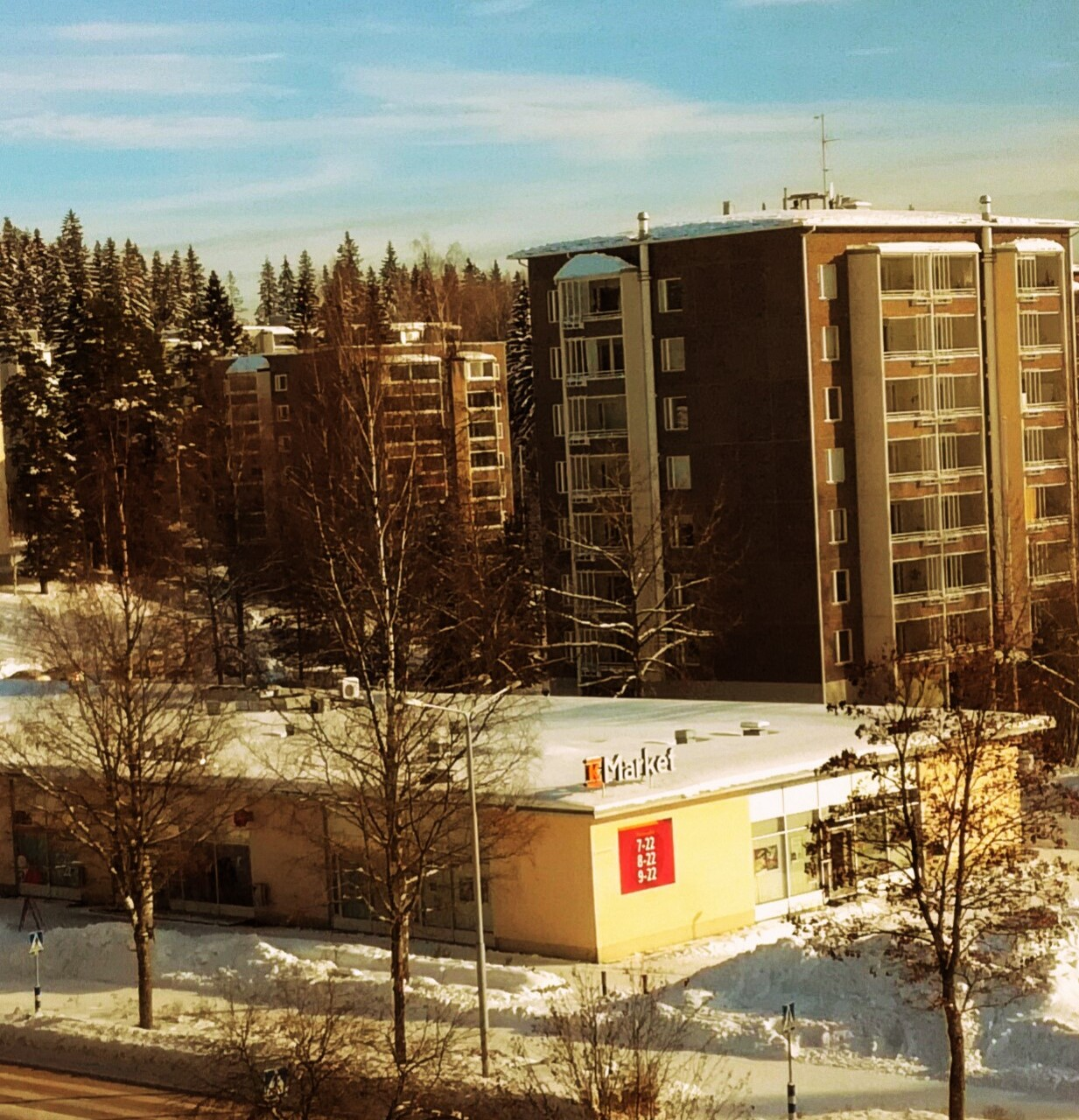
- Apartment buildings and a store in Kangaslampi.
- Country: Finland
- Province: Western Finland
- Region: Central Finland
- Sub-region: Jyväskylä sub-region
- City: Jyväskylä
- Ward: Huhtasuo

Population (2016)
  - Total: 9 373
- Time zone: UTC+2 (EET)
  - Summer (DST): UTC+3 (EEST)

Huhtasuo is a ward of Jyväskylä, Finland. It contains the Huhtasuo and Kangasvuori districts. The area was mostly built during the 1970s. The population of Huhtasuo was 9 373 in 2016.

== Gallery ==
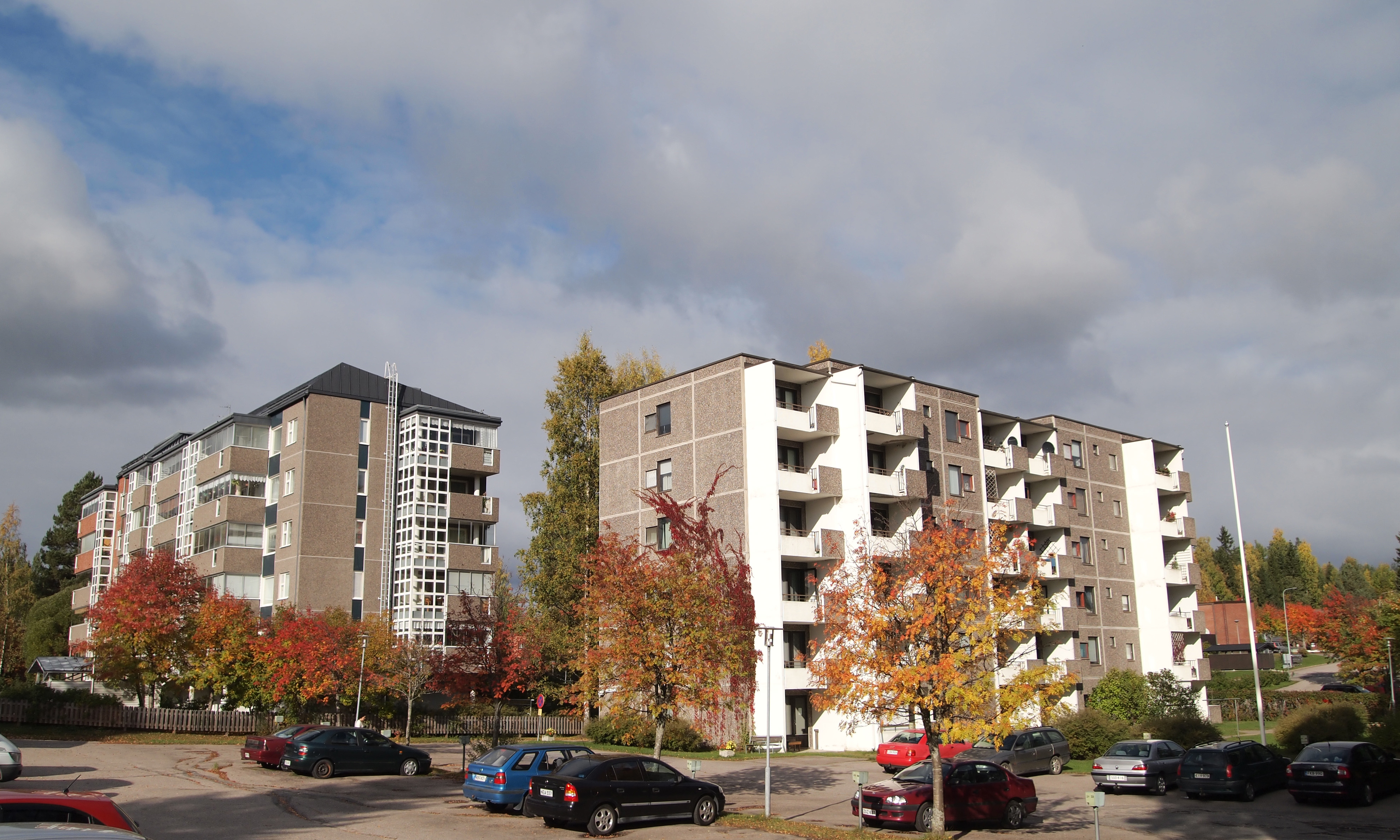
Apartment houses in Huhtasuo.

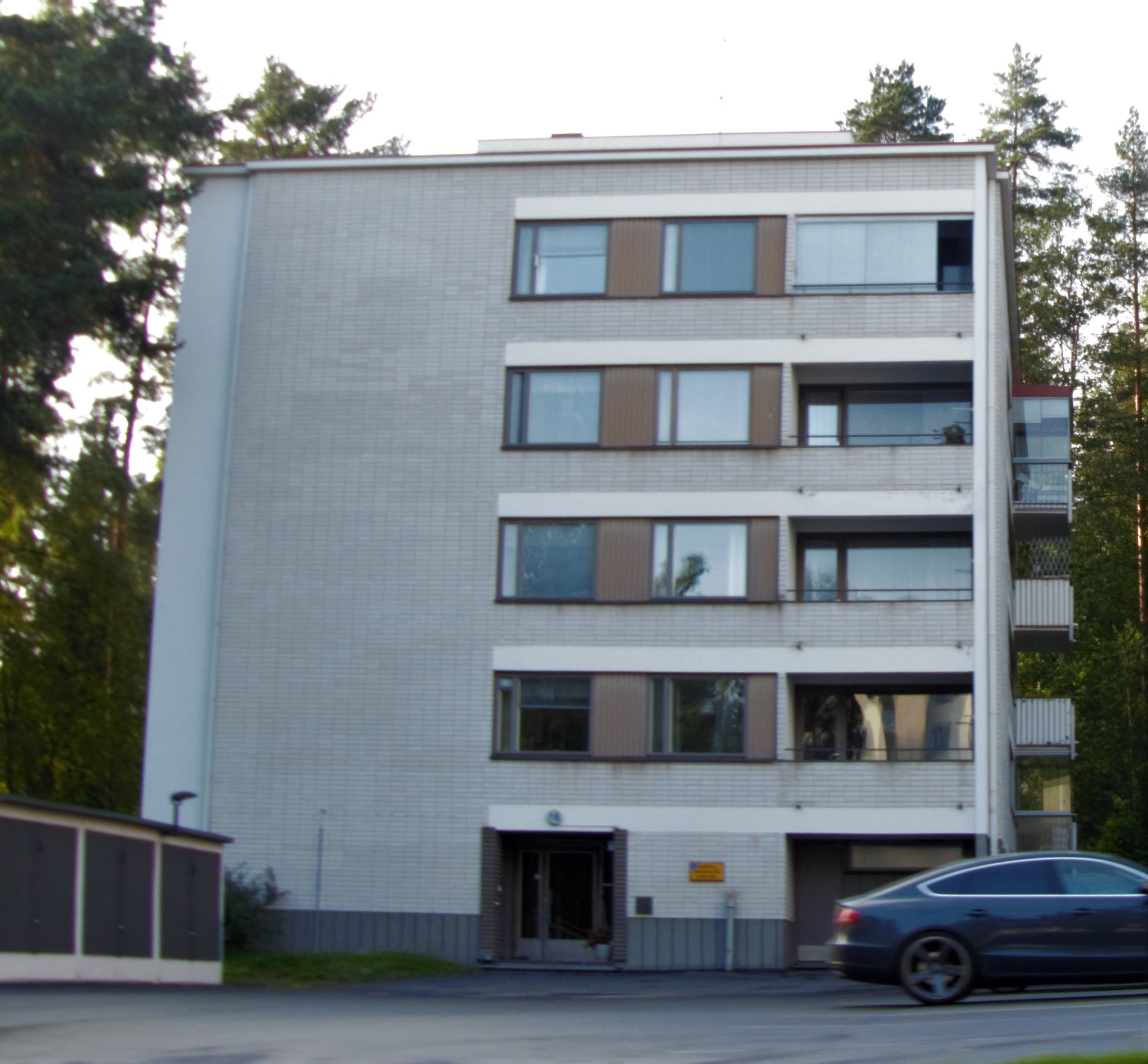
An apartment house in Kangasvuori.

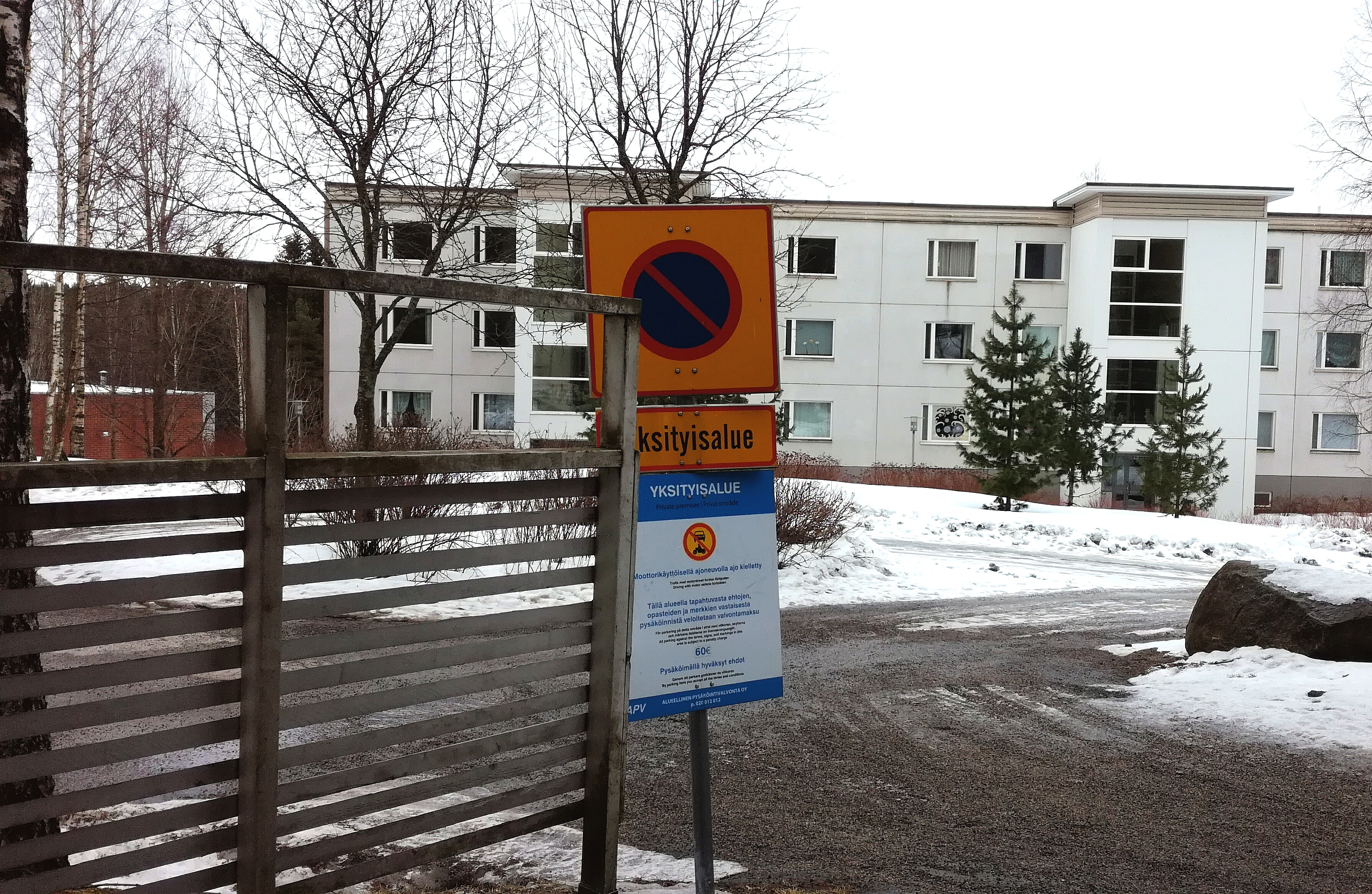
Pupuhuhta is a neighborhood built in the 1970s.

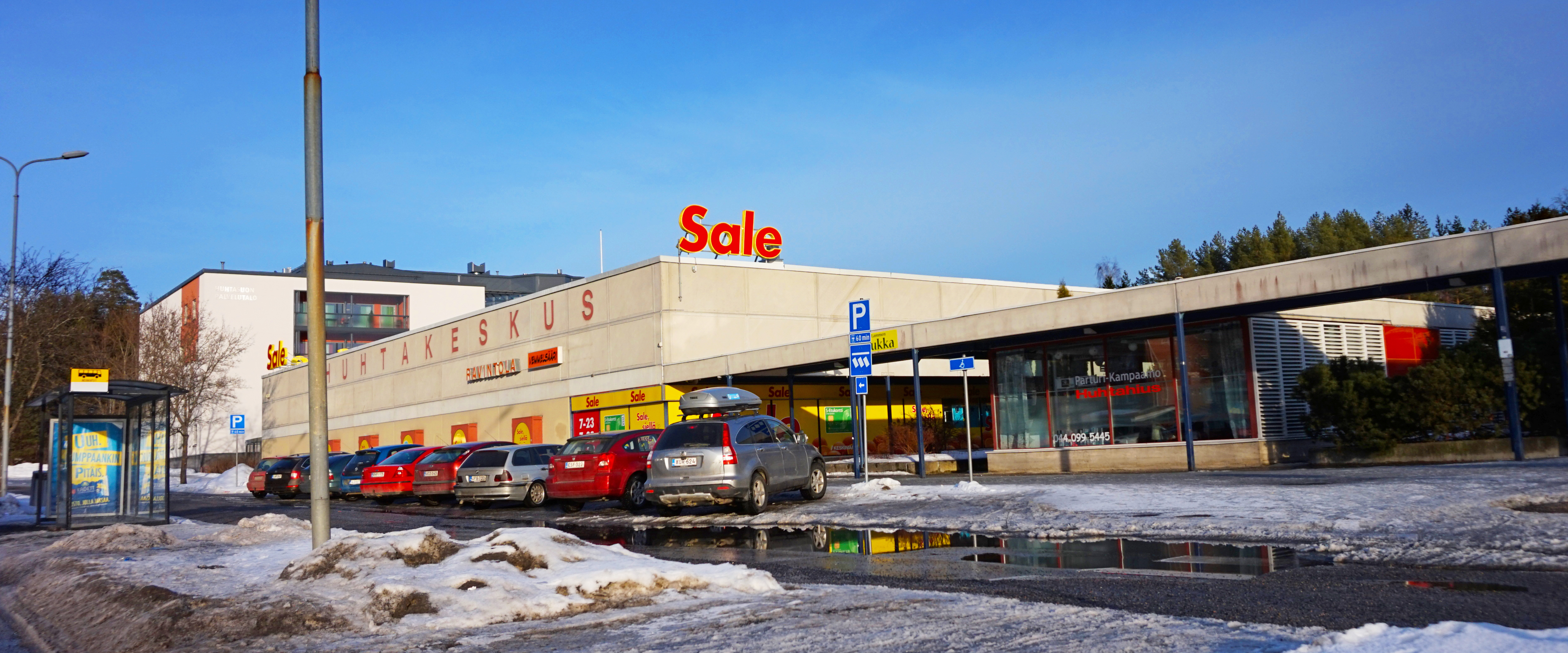
Huhtakeskus shopping mall.

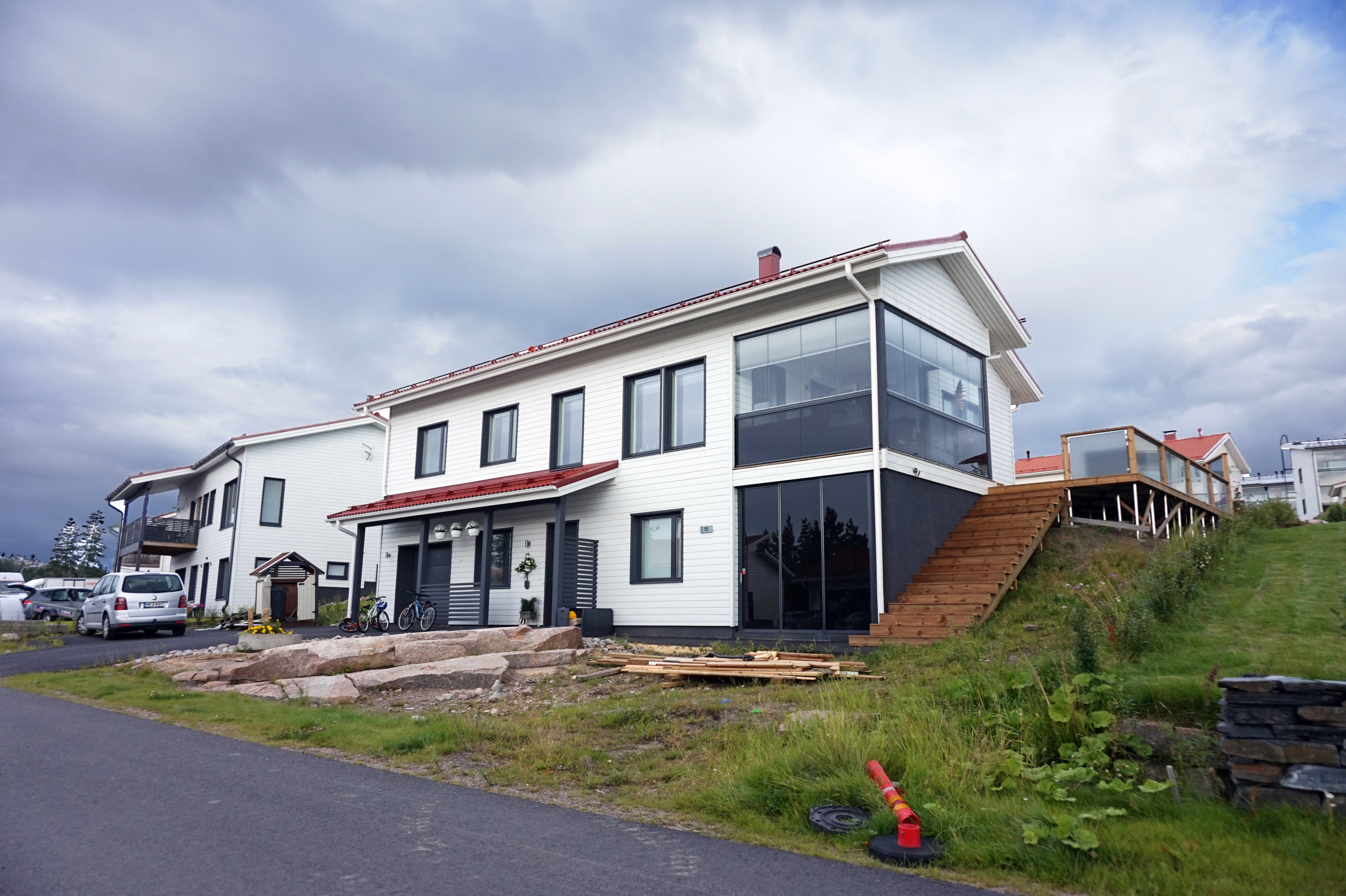
Houses built in the 2010s in Kangasvuori.

== Notable people ==
- Matti Nykänen, ski jumper
- Raimo Summanen, ice hockey player and coach
- Tarmo Uusivirta, boxer
