= Pupuhuhta =

Coordinates: 62°16′1″N 25°47′38″E

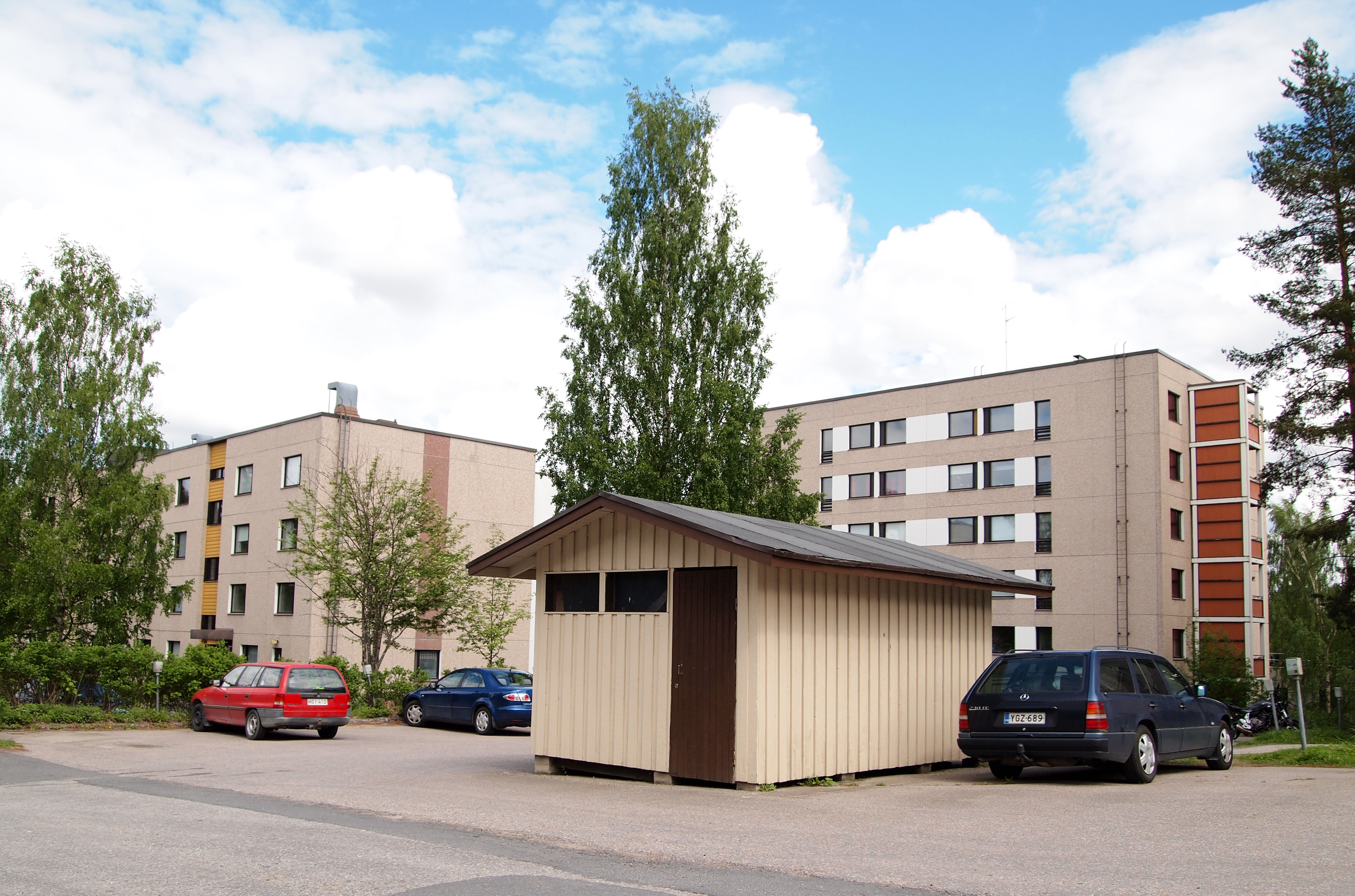
A street view

Pupuhuhta is a suburb (lähiö) in the Kangasvuori district in Jyväskylä, Finland. Pupuhuhta is located about four kilometers to northeast from the city center. The area contains mostly apartment houses that were built in the late 1970s. Pupuhuhta is one of the most multicultural neighborhoods in Jyväskylä. The population of the area was 2,731 in 2020.

The area has a bowling alley, a restaurant Fun Pub, a pizzeria, a family park and an elderly nursing home.

For decades, Pupuhuhta has suffered from a negative reputation. In 2013, the newspaper Iltalehti listed Pupuhuhta as "one of the most violent suburbs" in Finland. The unemployment rate has been relatively high in the area: in 2015 it was about 30 %, but in 1995 the rate was 40 %, so it has been getting lower during the years. Several projects have been implemented to improve the welfare of the local residents. Anyhow, many of the local residents think that the area has calmed down over the years and the negative image of the neighborhood has been exaggerated and maintained by people who don't live in the area.

== History ==
During the 1960s and 1970s the cities of Finland needed new apartments and Pupuhuhta was built in a hurry during the late 1970s to fill this need. The unemployment rate was around 30% in 2015, down from 40% in 1995.

== Gallery ==
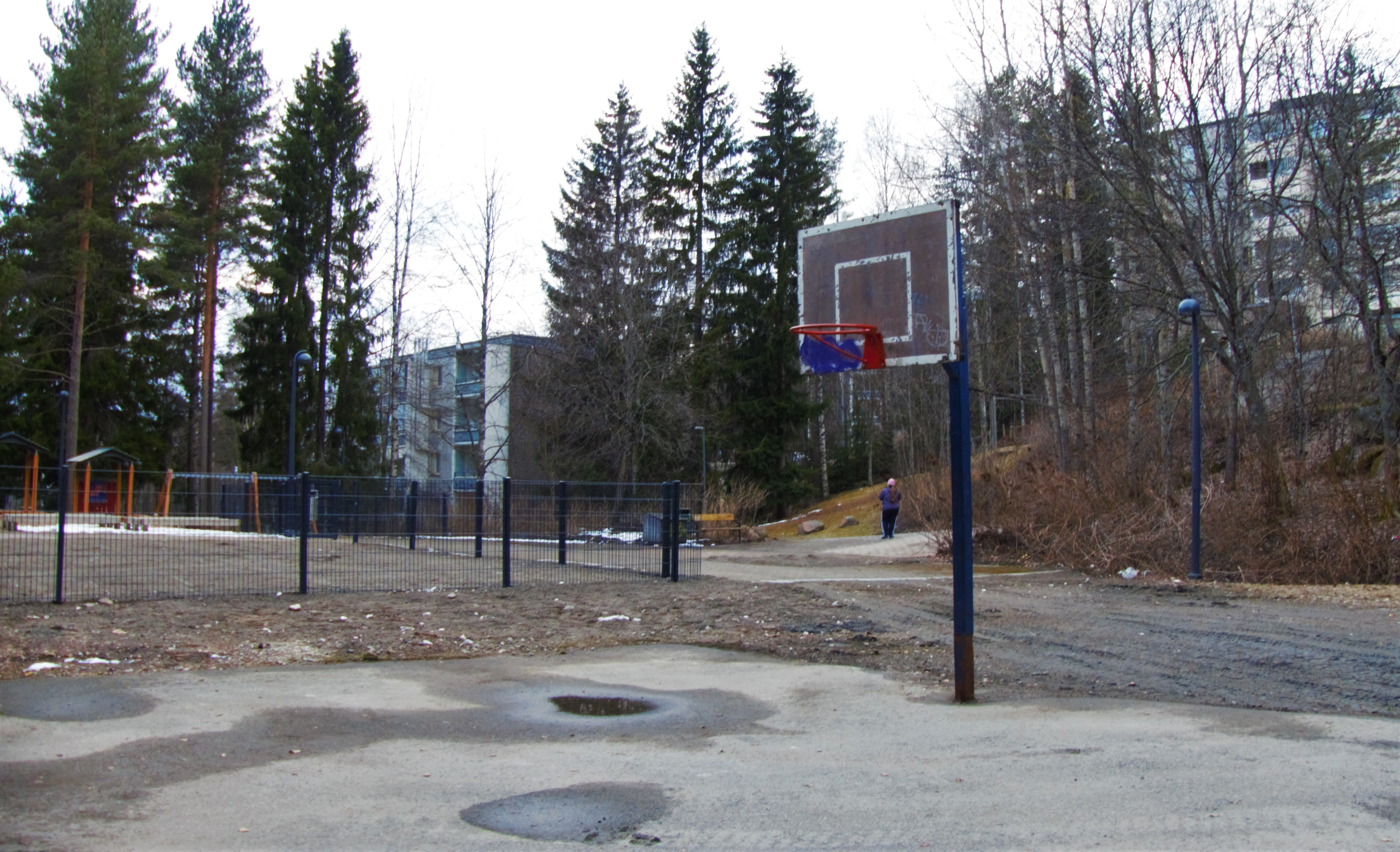
Pupuhuhta family park

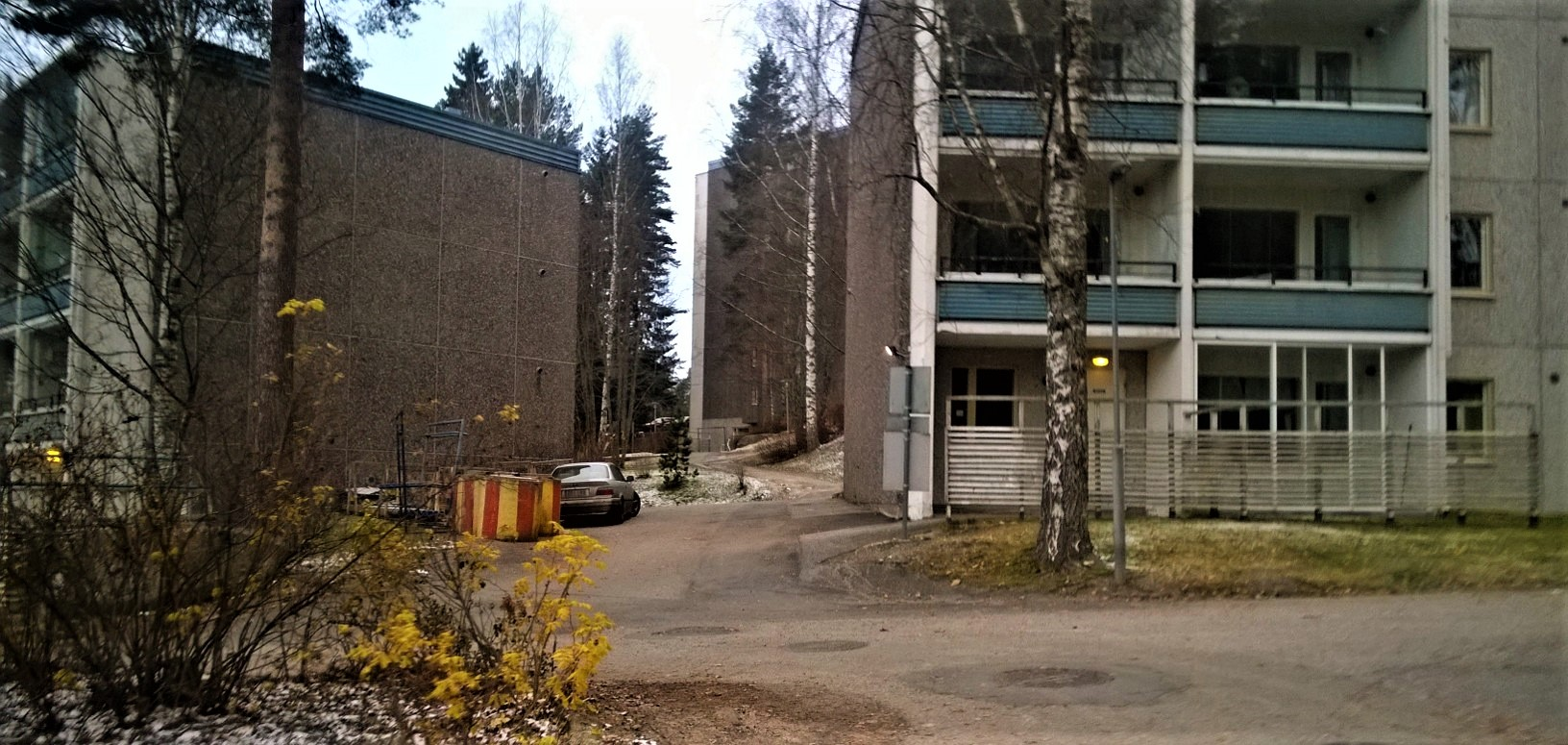
Apartment buildings in Pupuhuhta

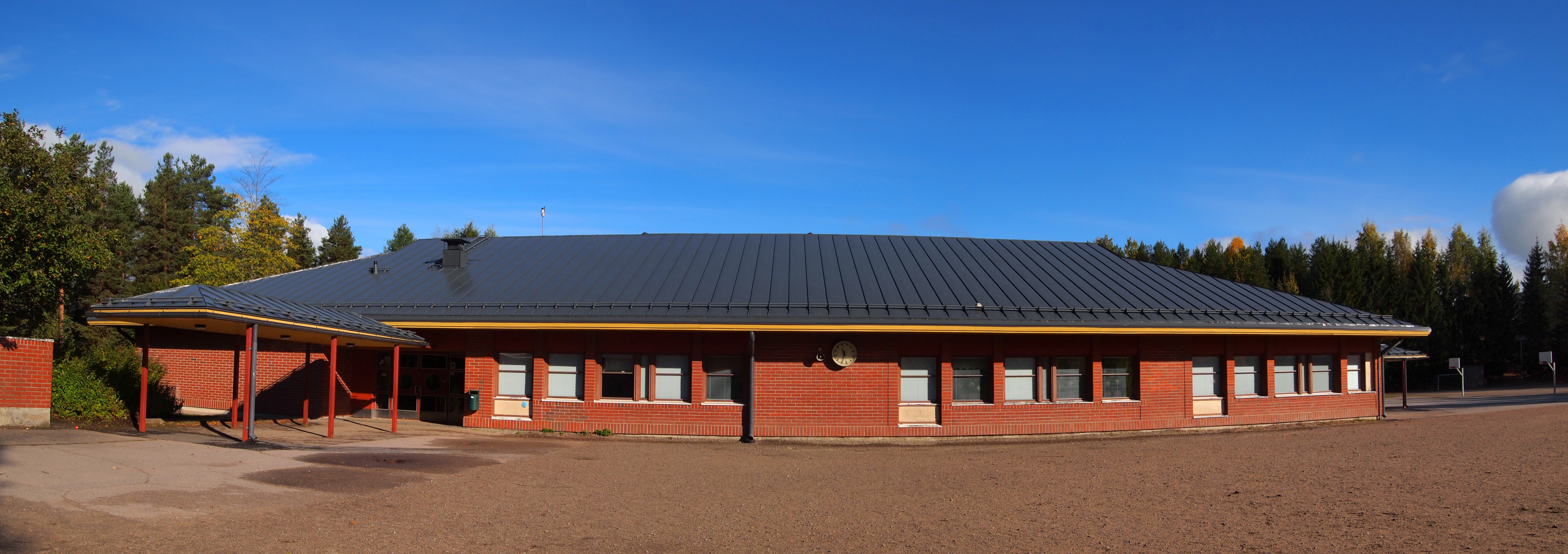
Pupuhuhta school

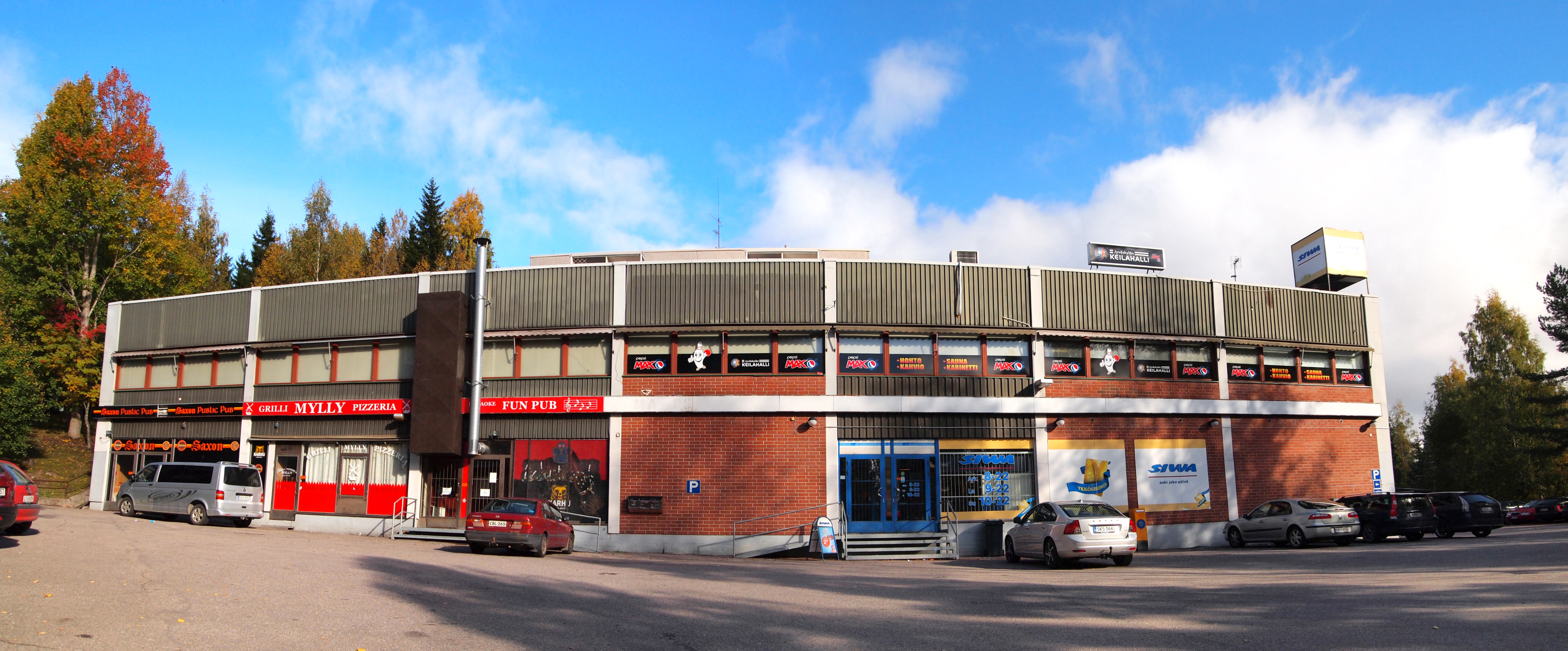
A commercial building in Pupuhuhta
