= Kangaslampi (Jyväskylä) =

Neighborhood in Jyväskylä, Finland

Coordinates: 62.2748°N 25.8088°E

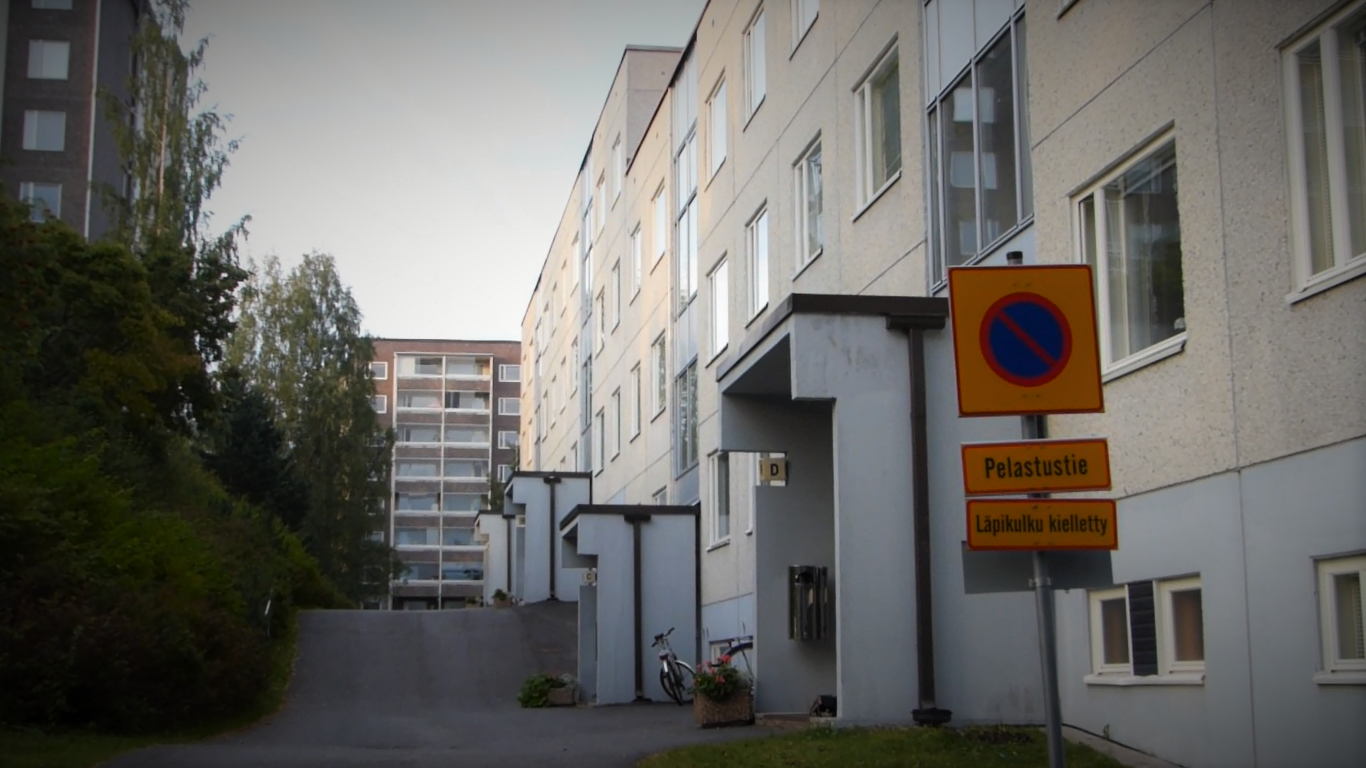
Apartment houses in Kangaslampi

Kangaslampi is a residential area in the Huhtasuo district of Jyväskylä, Finland. It is located about five kilometers to the northeast from the city center.

Kangaslampi and other Huhtasuo neighborhoods were mostly built during the 1970s as part of the broader development of suburban housing estates (lähiö) in Finland. The area has a convenience store, and it is located north of the nearby shopping centre Huhtakeskus. Kangaslampi is also the name of the pond in the area.

Kangaslampi has a big number of immigrants compared to most areas in Jyväskylä.

The suburb where the Finnish indie video game Last Drop mostly takes place—located in the fictional city of Nykylä—draws its inspiration largely from Kangaslampi.

== Gallery ==
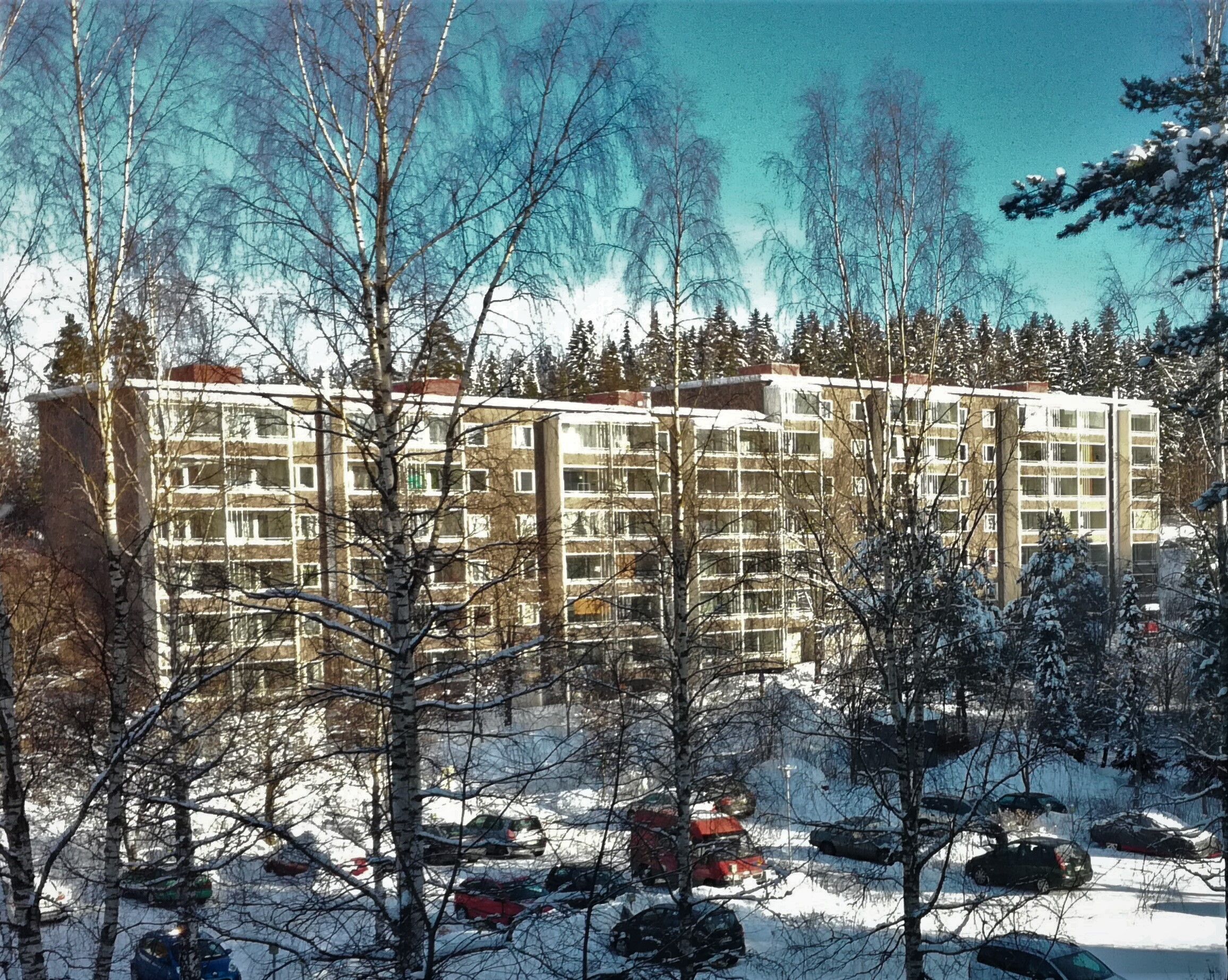
An apartment building in the area.

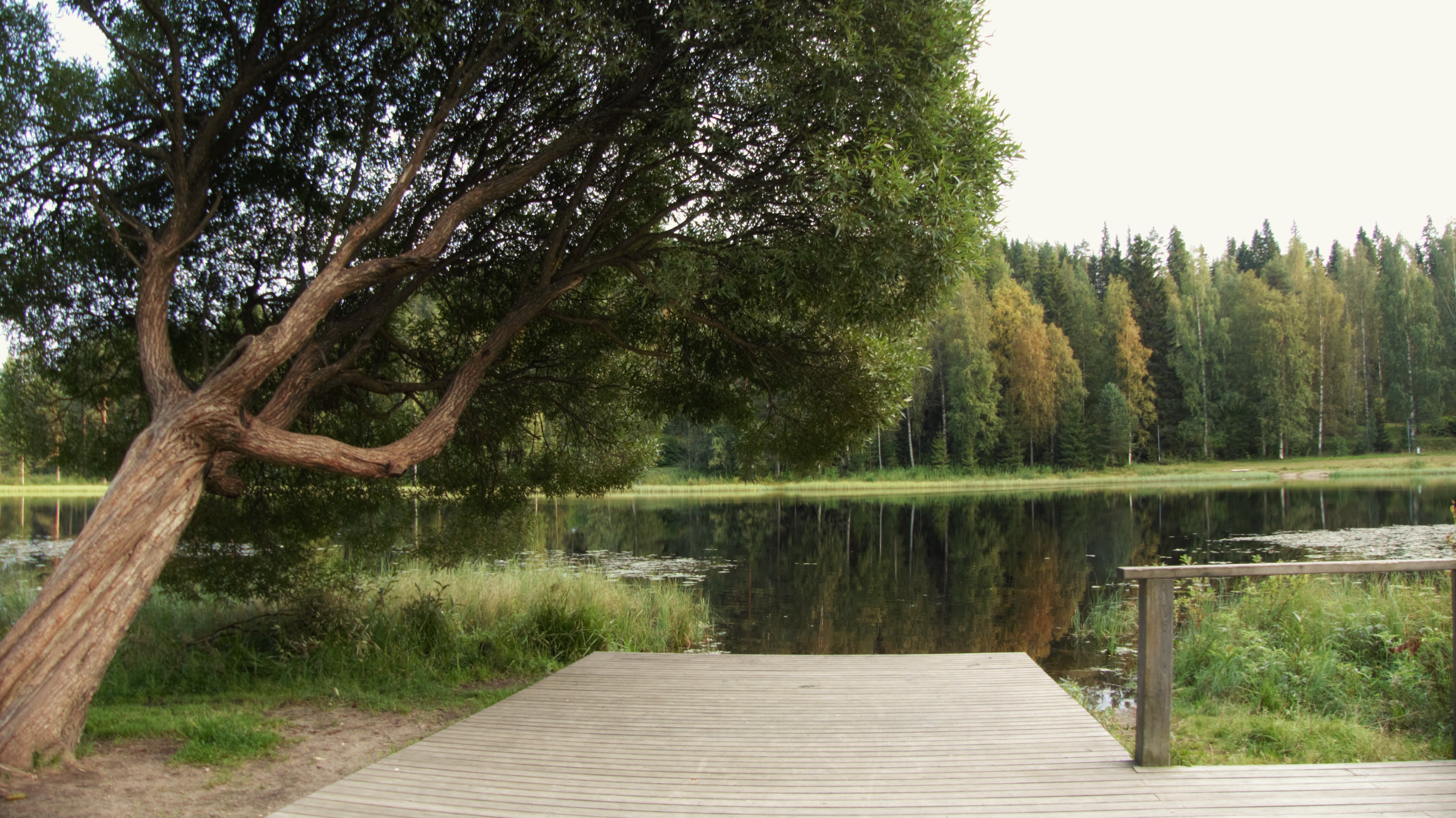
Pond Kangaslampi

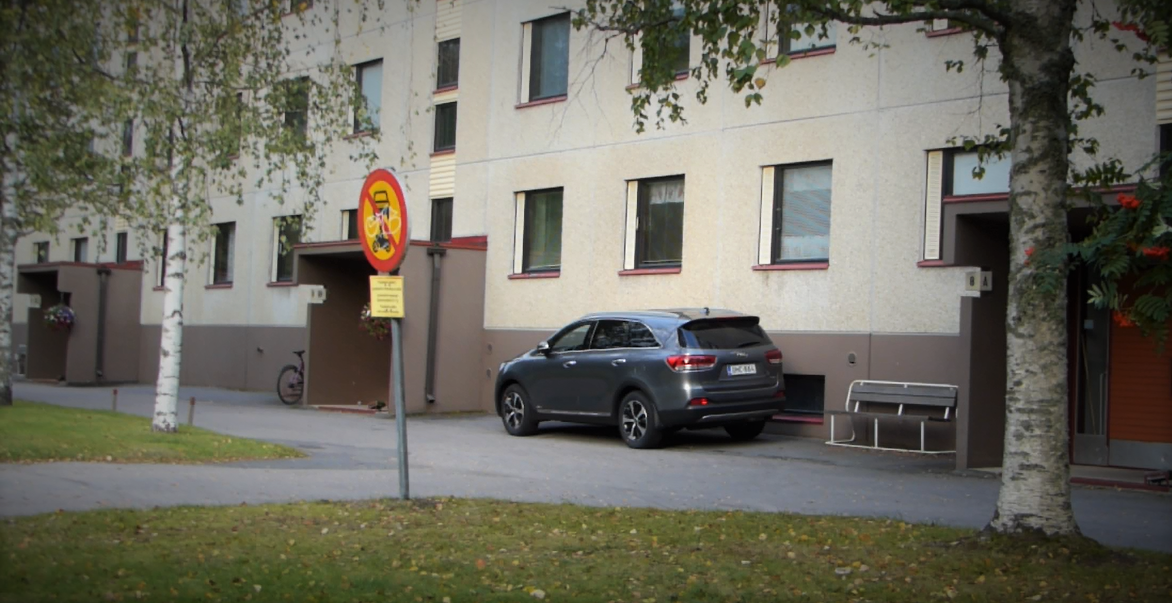
An apartment building in Kangaslampi.
