= Last Drop (video game) =

Early access video game

- Developer: Lohkare Games
- Publisher: Lohkare Games
- Engine: Unreal Engine 5
- Platform: Windows
- Release: 18 August 2026 (early access)
- Genre: Action-adventure game
- Mode: Single-player

Last Drop is a Finnish open world indie action-adventure game developed by Lohkare Games. The game is set in the fictional city of Nykylä (Note: Finnish: [ˈnykylæ].) in 1994, where the player takes the role of an unemployed alcoholic character named Seppo "Zeze" Sahtivaara. The game's tone highlights a stereotypical, self-ironic take on the "Finnish redneck" vibe—complete with swearing, brawling, and heavy drinking.

The game has been described as a kind of "Grand Theft Auto in Finland" by several media outlets. The game's sources of inspiration also include the Finnish game My Summer Car and the films of Aki Kaurismäki. According to Henri Koskinen, CEO of Lohkare Games, the game's story was inspired by an alcoholic man who lived in the neighborhood where he grew up; alcoholism serves as a central theme of the story. The storytelling is described as "documentary-style", and the game's script has been influenced by the films of Quentin Tarantino.

A screenshot from the game, showing the player controlling Zeze as he adventures in the city of Nykylä.

The game world is 22 × 25 kilometers in size, and it's based on the city of Jyväskylä where the developers of the game come from; the suburb serving as the game's primary core area draws inspiration from the Kangaslampi suburb. In addition to Lohkare Games, around a hundred interns have worked on the game, contributing to areas such as 3D modeling, sound design, music, and cutscenes. In March 2026, Lohkare Games announced that the voice actors for Last Drop include Tommi Korpela, Jukka Rasila, Ilkka Koivula, Mato Valtonen, and late Olga Temonen, whose voice will be heard as the saleswoman at a store called Lamppari. For now, the game is single-player only, but Lohkare Games has announced that a multiplayer mode is planned.

The game's demo was released on Steam on February 24, 2025. The full game was originally scheduled to be released in May 2026, but the game's official early access release was on August 18. The game has been well received, with praise directed at, among other things, its satirical approach.

== See also ==
- Grand Theft Auto clone
- Video games in Finland
