= Kangasvuori =

- District of Jyväskylä
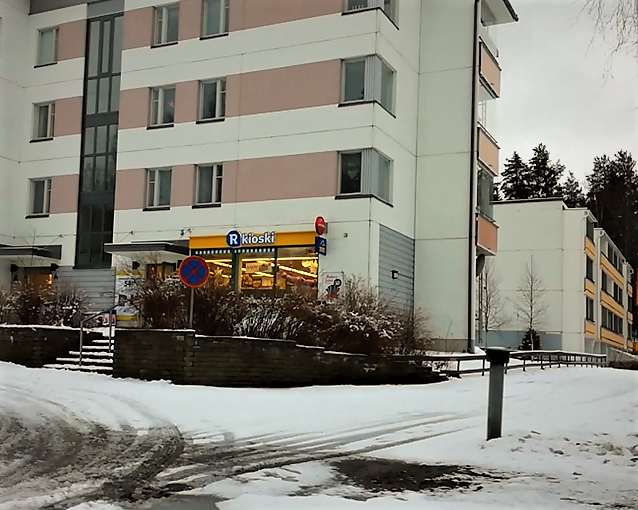
- Apartment houses and an R-kioski shop in Kangasvuori.
- Interactive map of Kangasvuori
- Coordinates: 62.2616°N 25.7903°E
- Country: Finland
- Province: Western Finland
- Region: Central Finland
- Sub-region: Jyväskylä sub-region
- City: Jyväskylä
- Ward: Huhtasuo
- Time zone: UTC+2 (EET)
  - Summer (DST): UTC+3 (EEST)
- Postal code: 40320, 40340

Kangasvuori is a district and a statistical area of Jyväskylä, Finland. The statistical area forms the Huhtasuo ward together with Huhtasuo and the Vääräjärvi suburb of Ankeriasjärvi. Kangasvuori was mostly built during 1965–1976, making it the oldest suburban area in the ward.

The statistical area of Kangasvuori is officially divided into five sub-districts (pienalue): Seppälä, Pupuhuhta, Rasinrinne, Läntinen Kangasvuori and Itäinen Kangasvuori. Seppälä is a commercial area, Pupuhuhta is a suburb built in the 1970s. The construction of Rasinrinne started in the 1990s. Läntinen Kangasvuori is dominated by apartment buildings that were built in 1960s and 1970s, whereas Itäinen Kangasvuori mostly consists of row houses and single-family houses along with some apartment buildings.

== Gallery ==
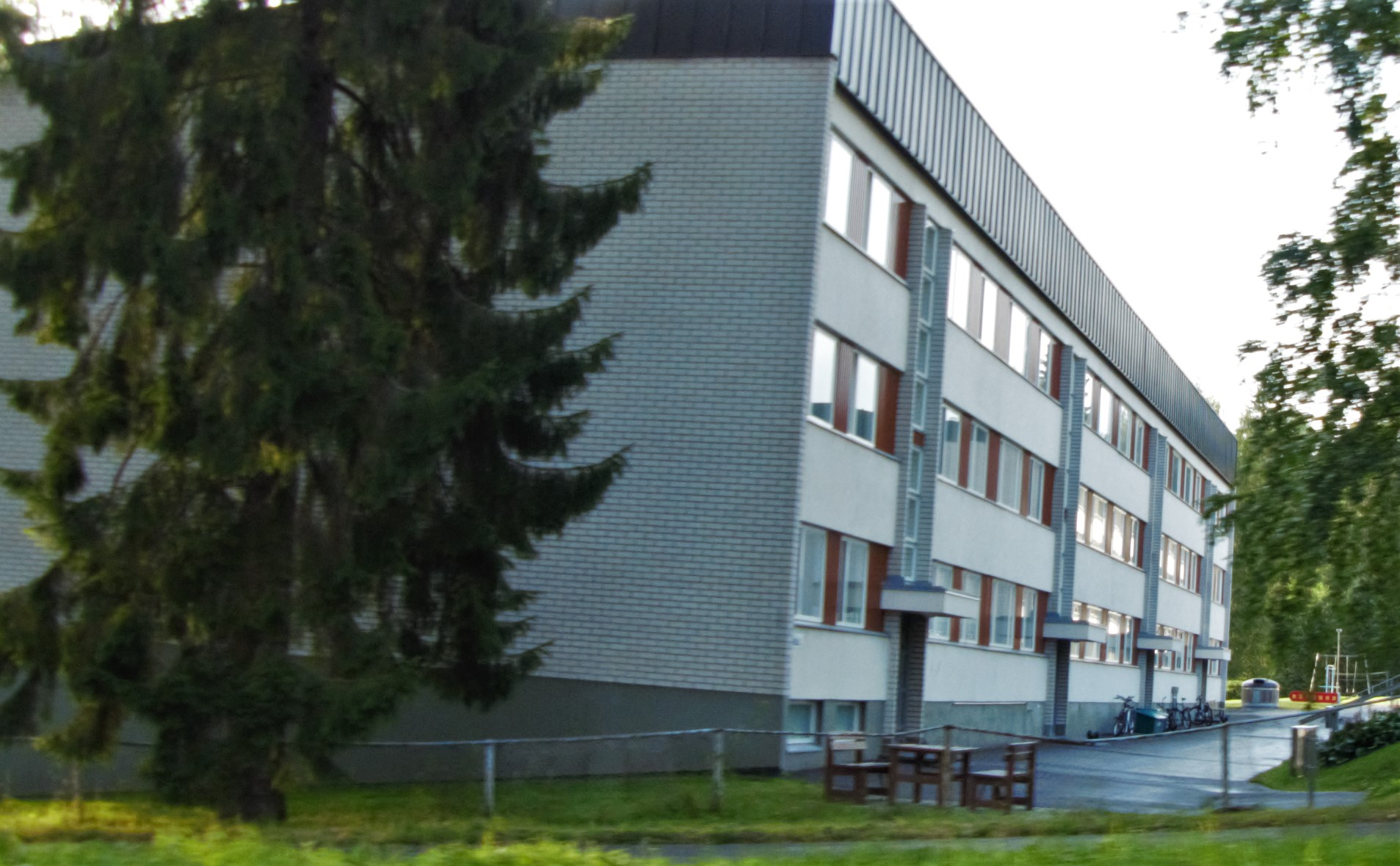
An apartment building in Läntinen Kangasvuori.

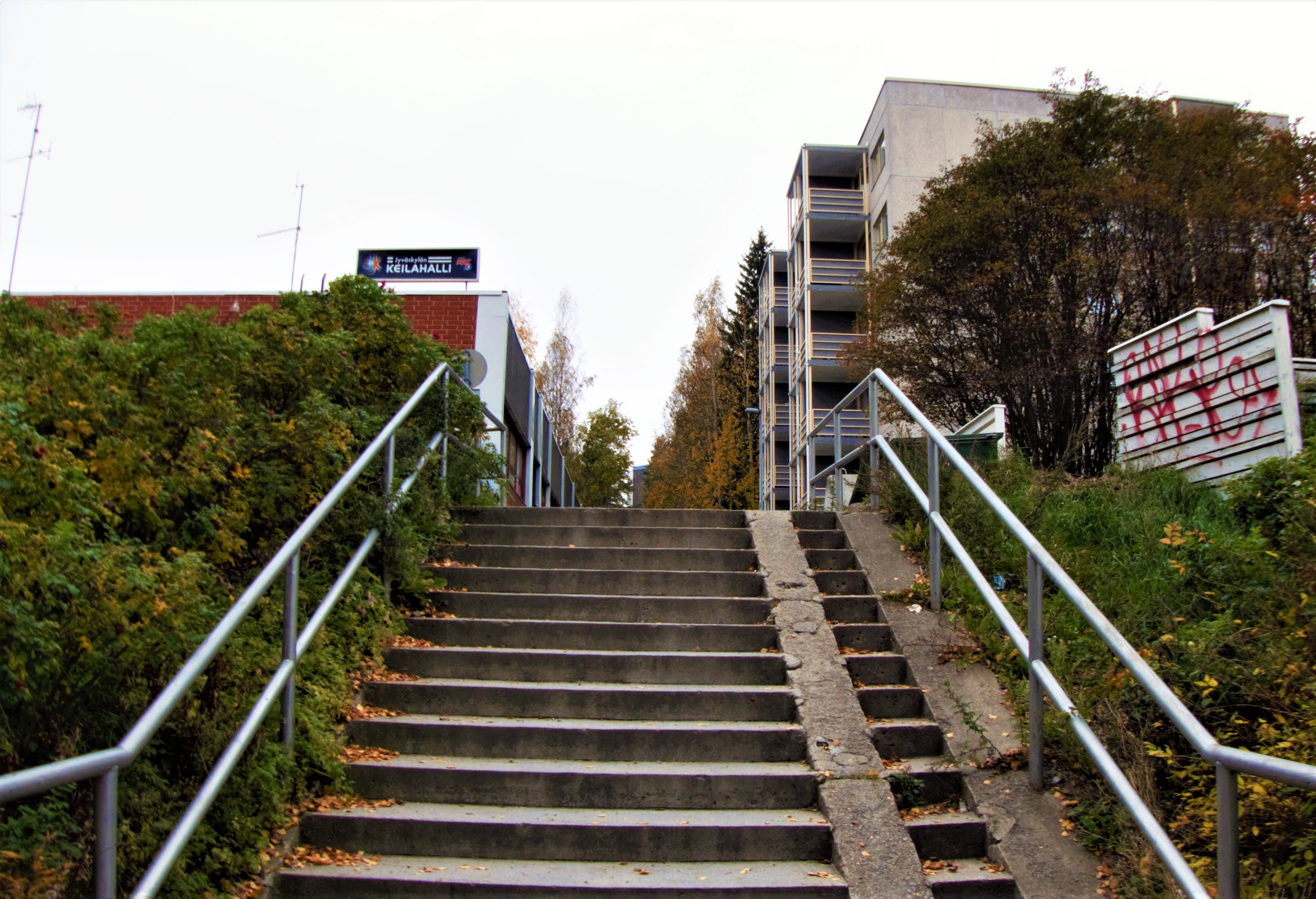
Pupuhuhta neighborhood.

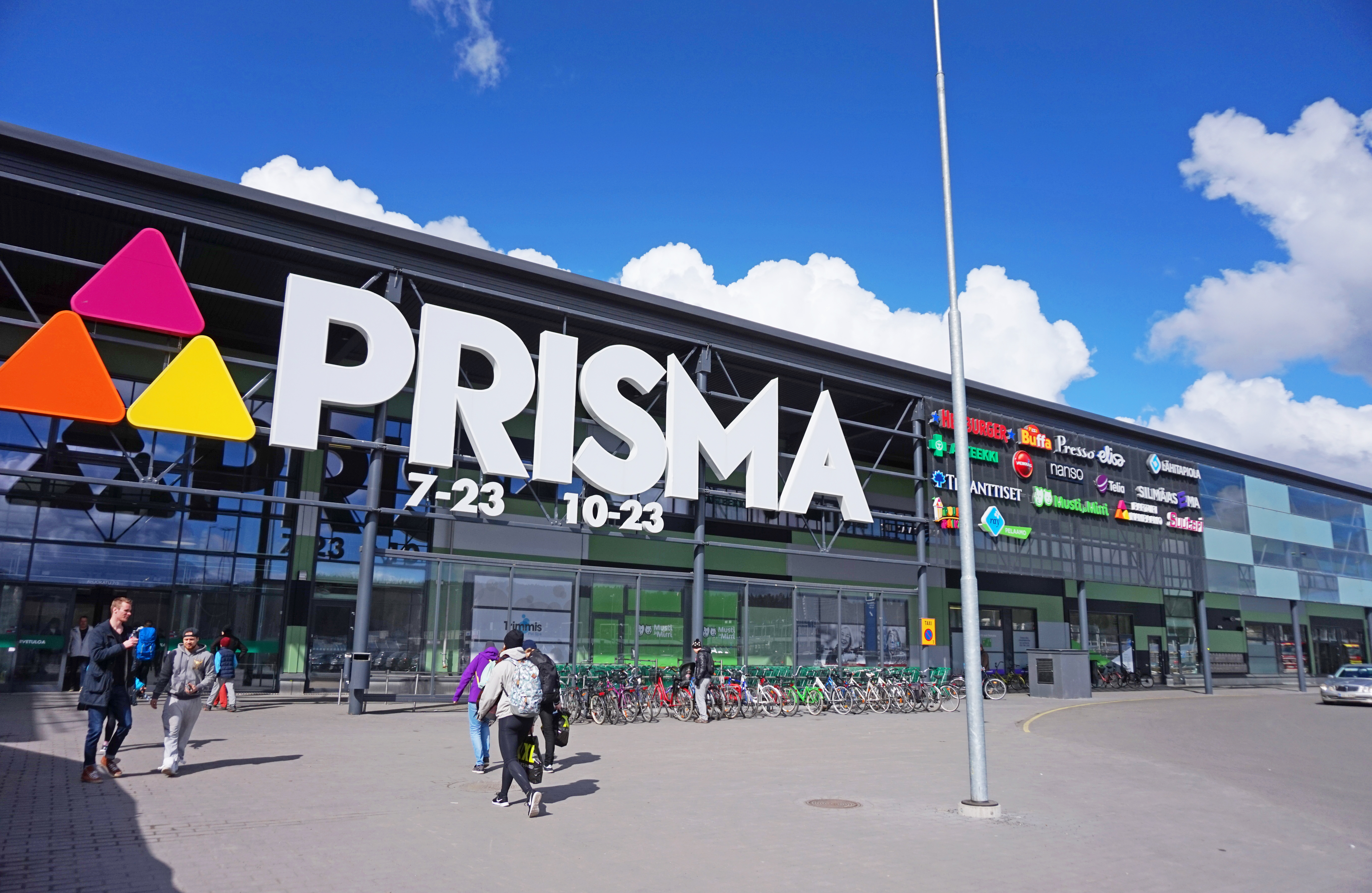
Prisma store in Seppälä.

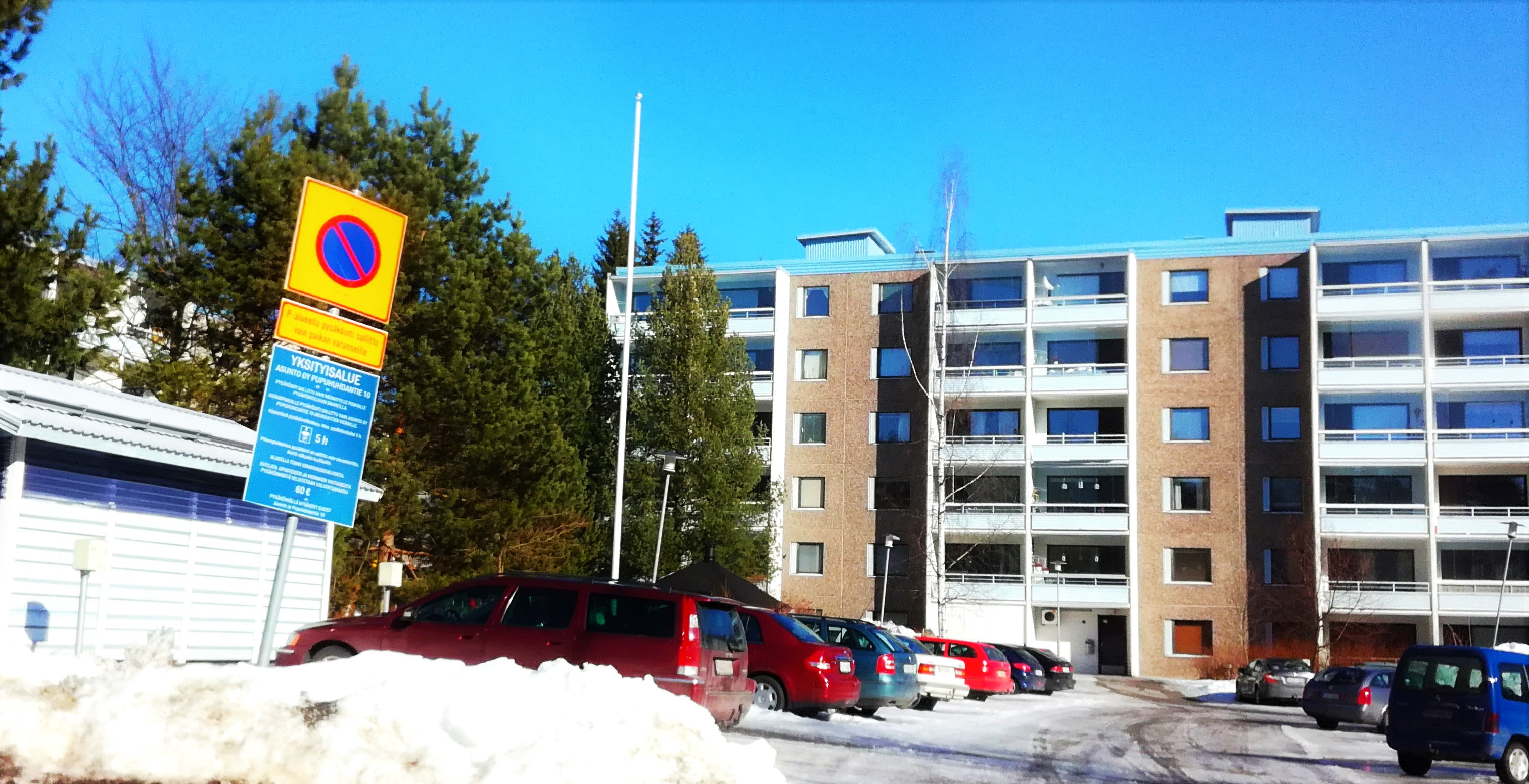
Street Pupuhuhdantie.

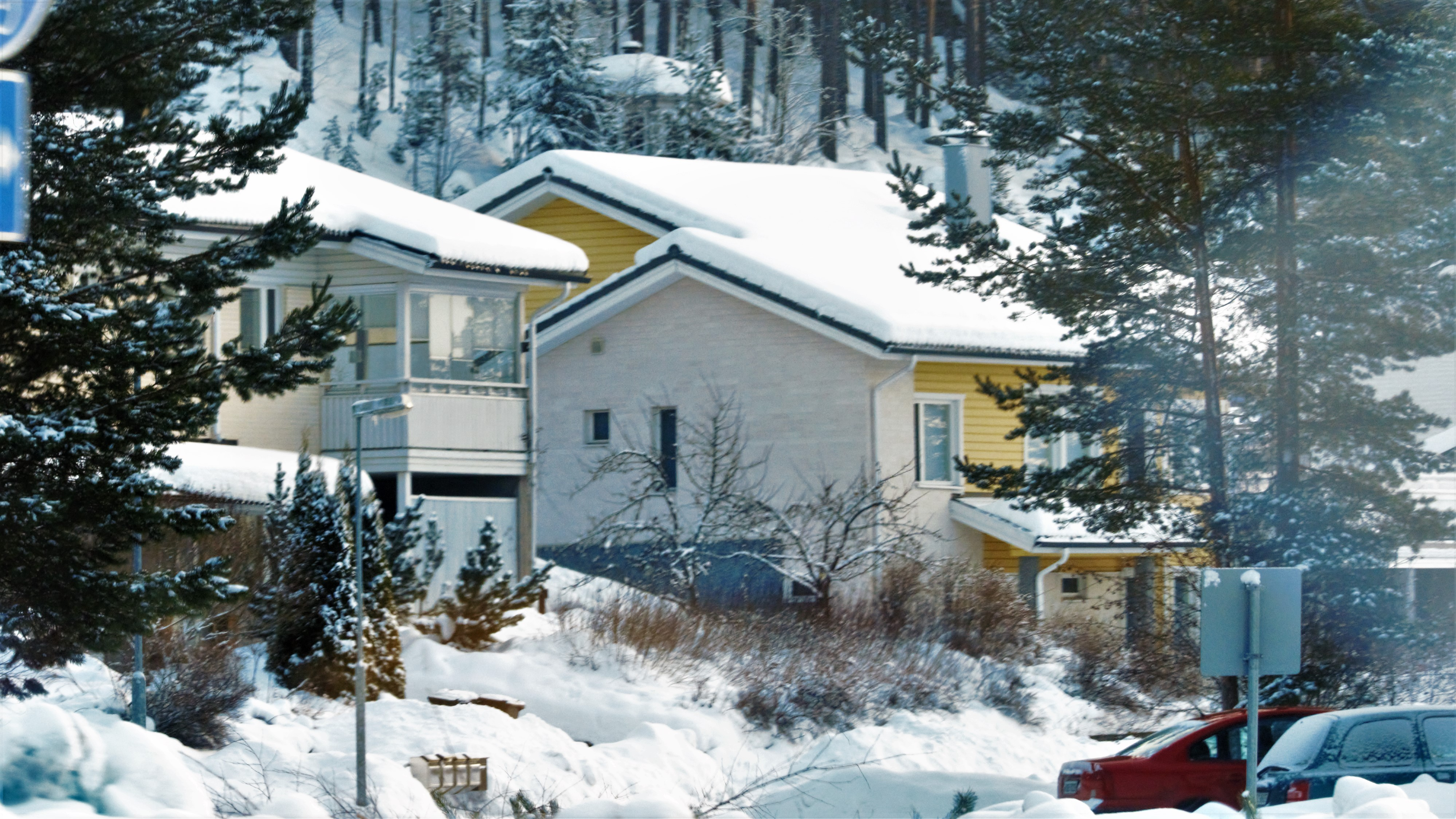
Rasinrinne area

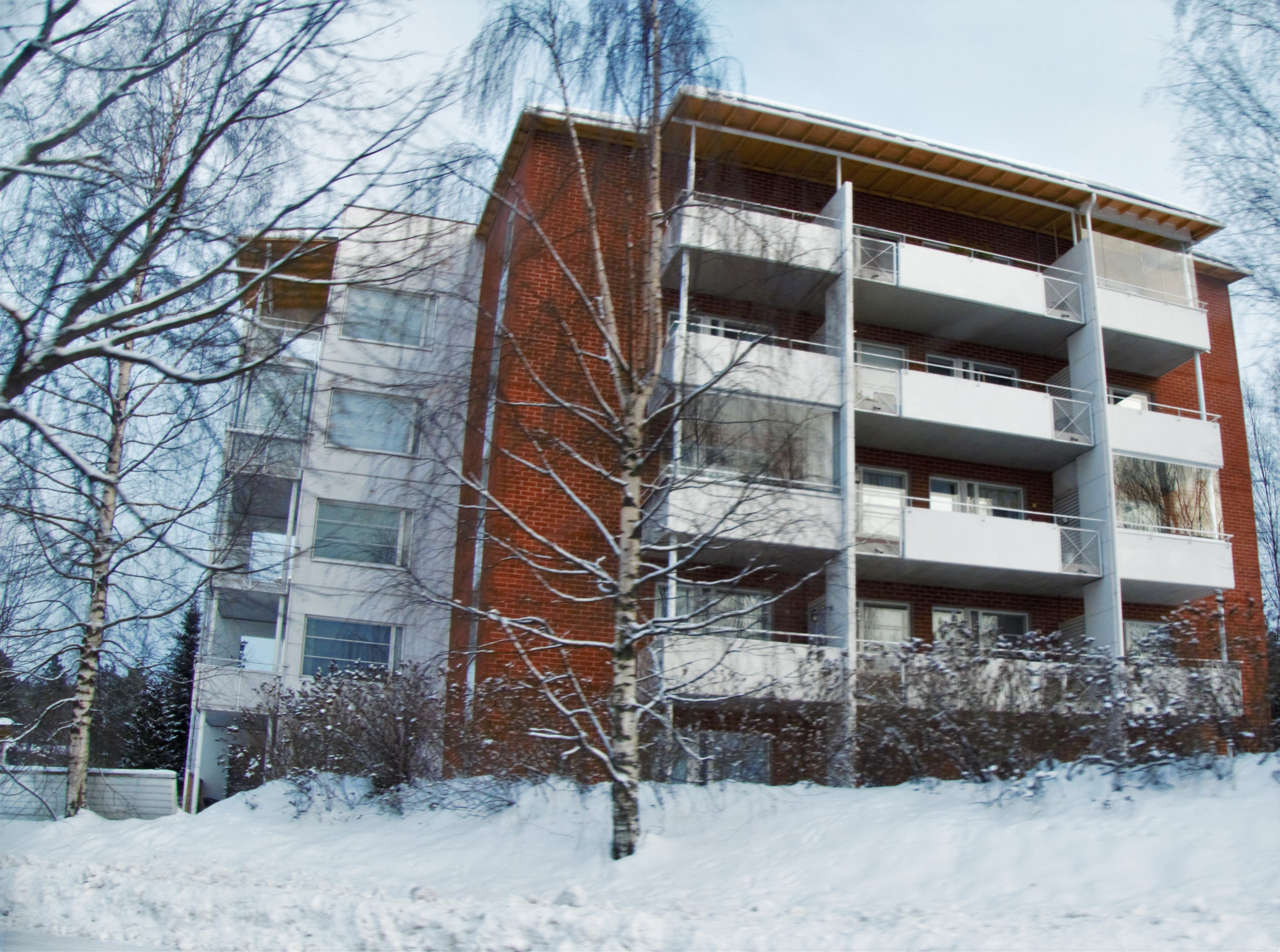
An apartment house built in 1998.
