= Kaakkolampi (Jyväskylä, Huhtasuo) =

Lake in Jyväskylä, Finland

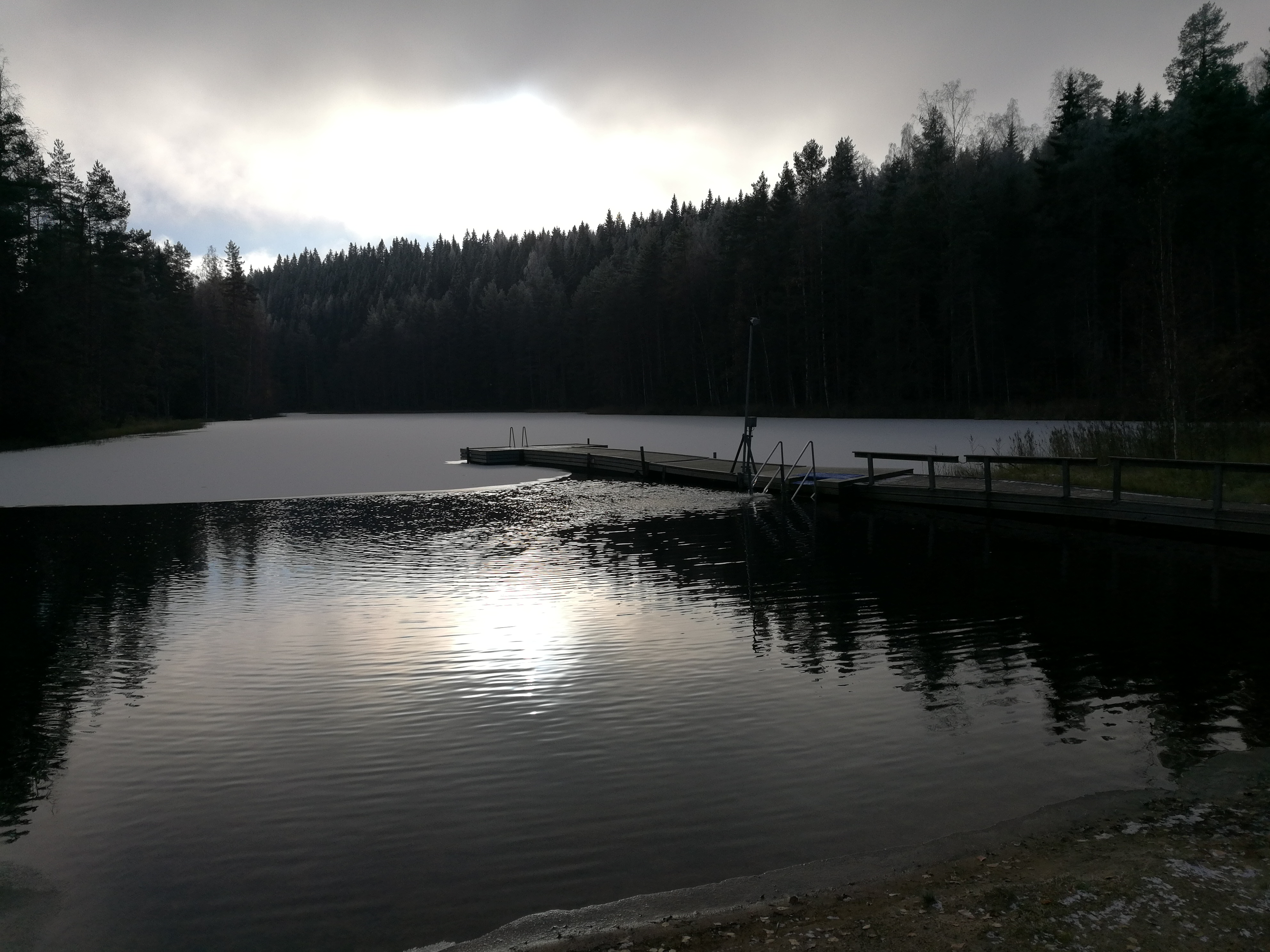
- Interactive map of Kaakkolampi
- Location: Huhtasuo, Jyväskylä
- Coordinates: 62°16′08″N 25°49′12″E
- Basin countries: Finland
- Max. length: 300 m (980 ft)
- Max. width: 100 m (330 ft)
- Surface area: 1.35 ha (3.3 acres)
- Average depth: 4.11 m (13.5 ft)
- Max. depth: 6.6 m (22 ft)
- Water volume: 55,300 m^{3} (1,950,000 cu ft)
- Surface elevation: 134 m (440 ft)
- Islands: 0

Kaakkolampi is a pond or a small lake in the Huhtasuo district of Jyväskylä, Finland. The residential areas of Kaakkolampi and Sulku are respectively located to the east and north of the lake.

== Details ==
Kaakkolampi is located 134 meters above sea level. Its depth is 6.6 meters. The area is 1.4 hectares and the coastline is 0.75 kilometers long. The highest point in the vicinity is 200 meters above sea level, 3 km east of the pond.

Kaakkolampi is part of the Kymijoki main catchment area, specifically its Autiojoki basin, which discharges into Leppävesi. Kaakkolampi drains into the nearby Vääräjärvi via an unnamed stream beginning from the northeastern end of the lake.
