= Huhtasuo =

City district in Jyväskylä, Finland

Coordinates: 62.2715°N 25.8039°E

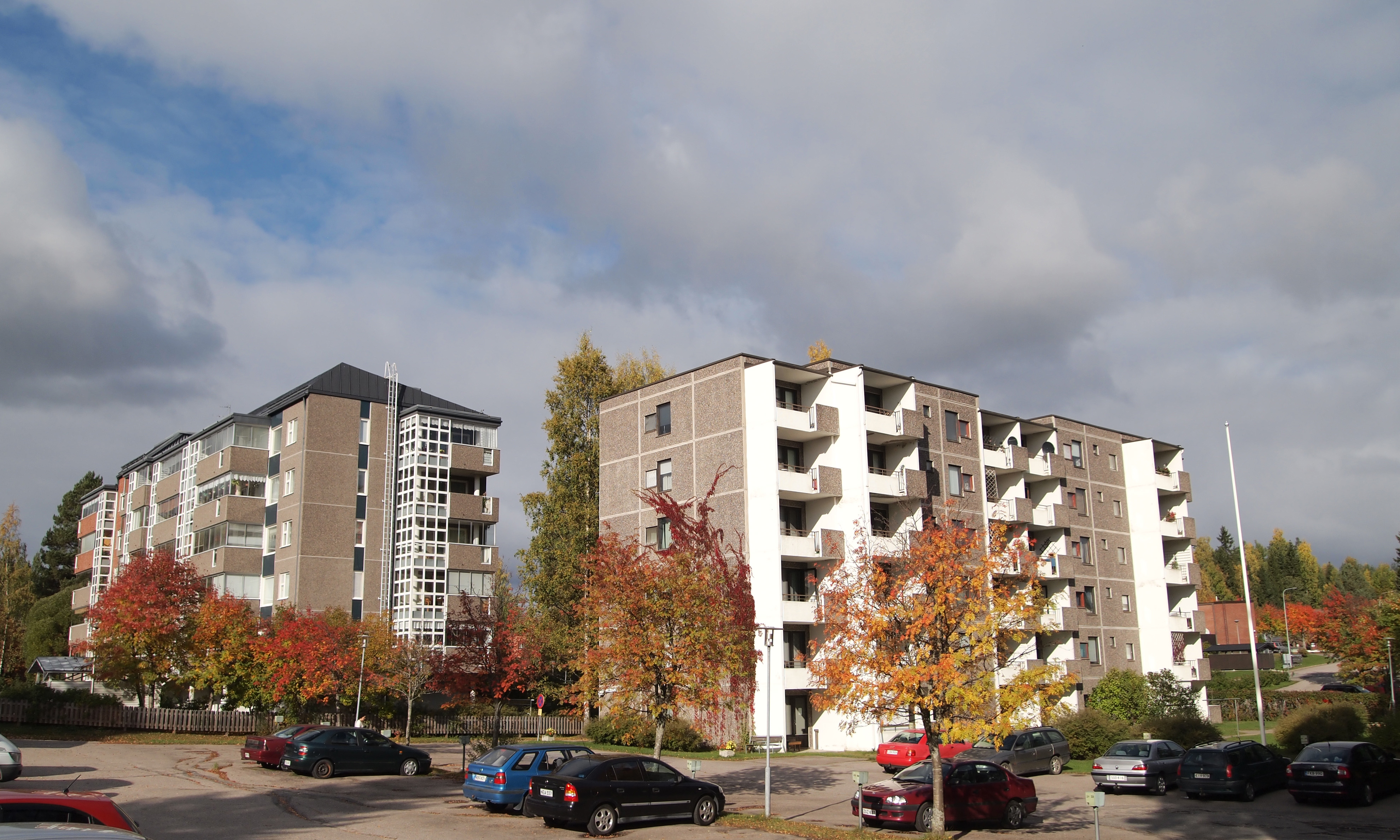
Apartment houses in Kangaslampi.

Huhtasuo is one of the districts of Jyväskylä, Finland. It is located about 4–5 kilometers from the city center to the northeast. Kangaslampi, Sulku, Varikko, Huhtakeskus and Kaakkolampi are subareas of the district. Along with the neighboring Kangasvuori district, Huhtasuo district is a part of the Huhtasuo ward.

The construction of the suburban housing estates, consisting largely of apartment buildings, started in Huhtasuo in the 1970s, as a continuation of the development of Kangasvuori during the previous decade. There are also row houses and single-family houses in the area. Local services include a library, a school, and convenience stores. The Huhtakeskus shopping centre was built to be the service hub of its surrounding residential areas.

The population of Huhtasuo was 4,542 in 2020. Huhtasuo has big number of immigrants compared to the other areas in Jyväskylä.

== Gallery ==
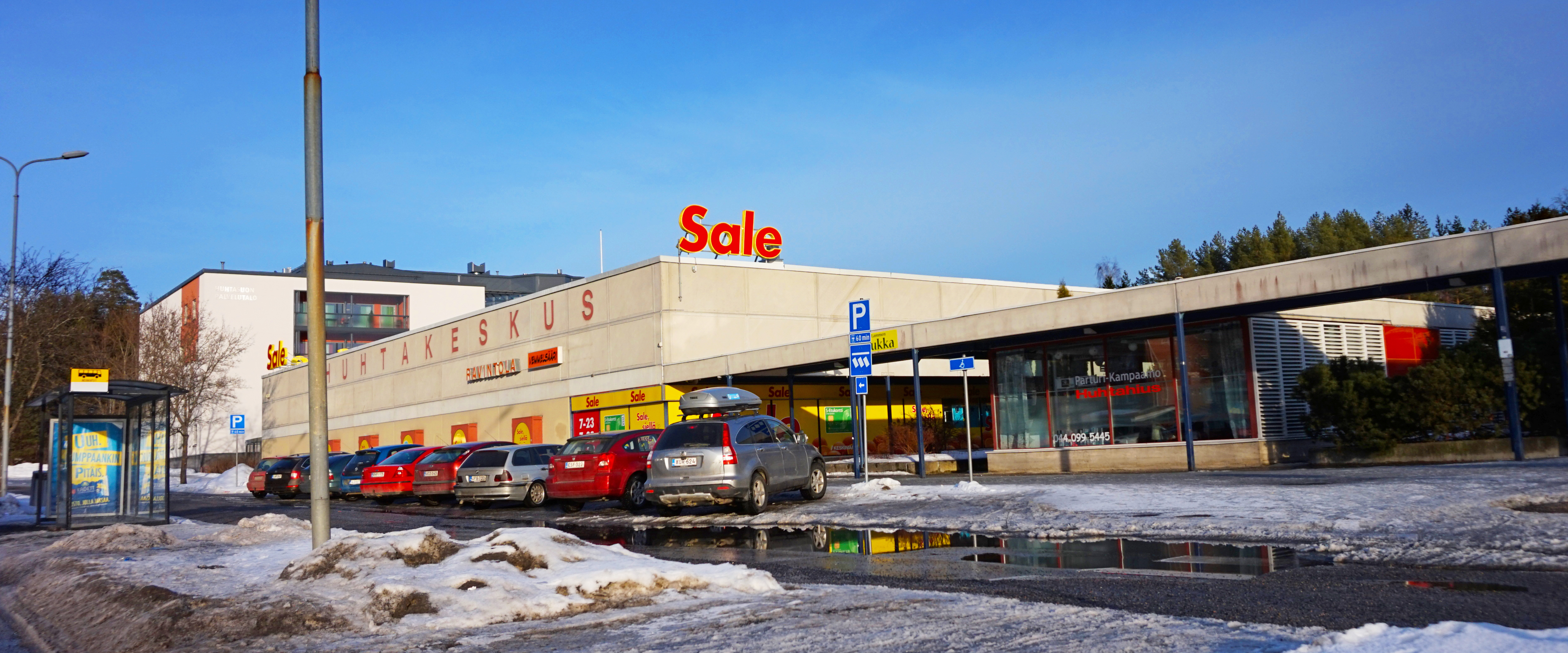
Huhtakeskus shopping centre

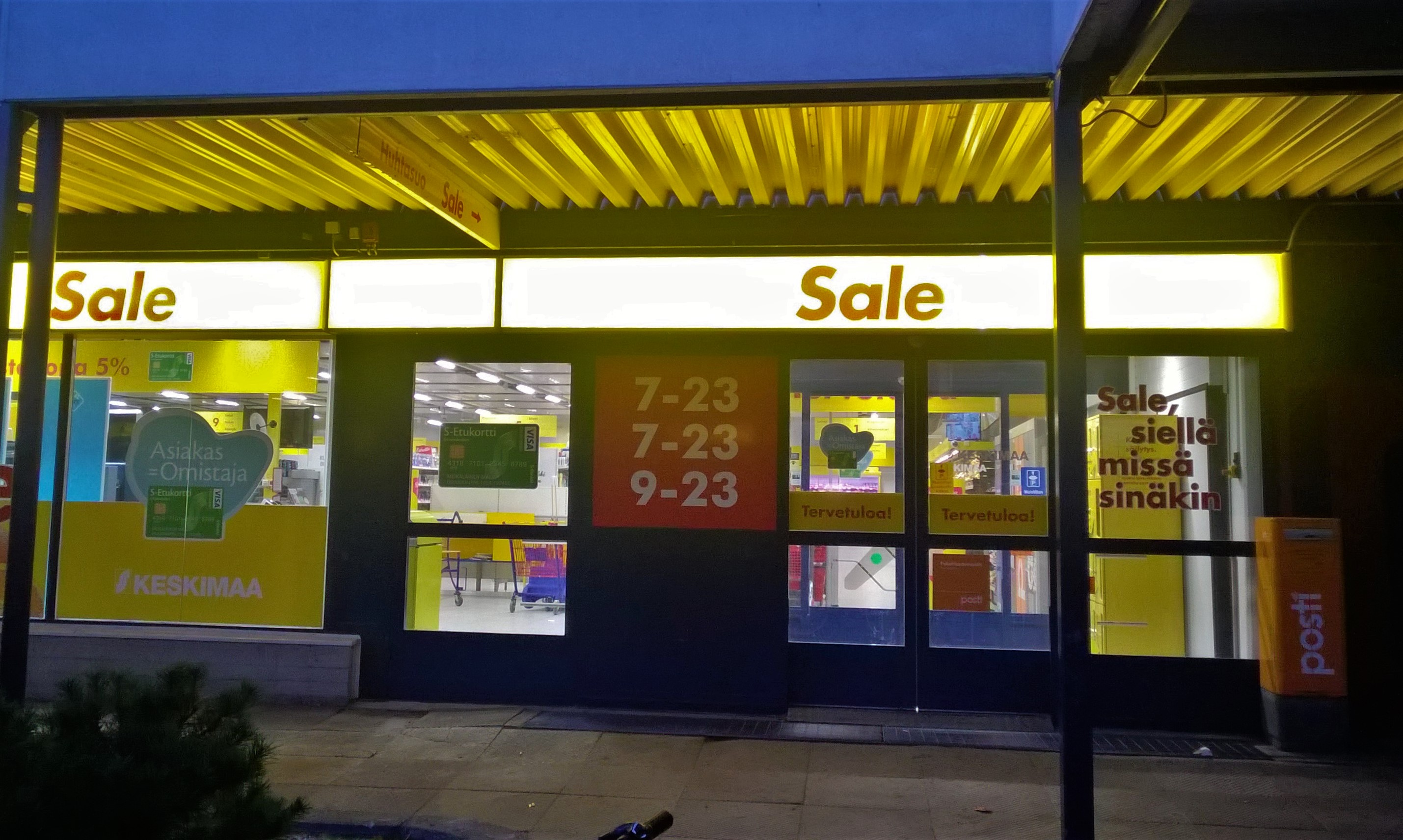
A Sale store in Huhtakeskus

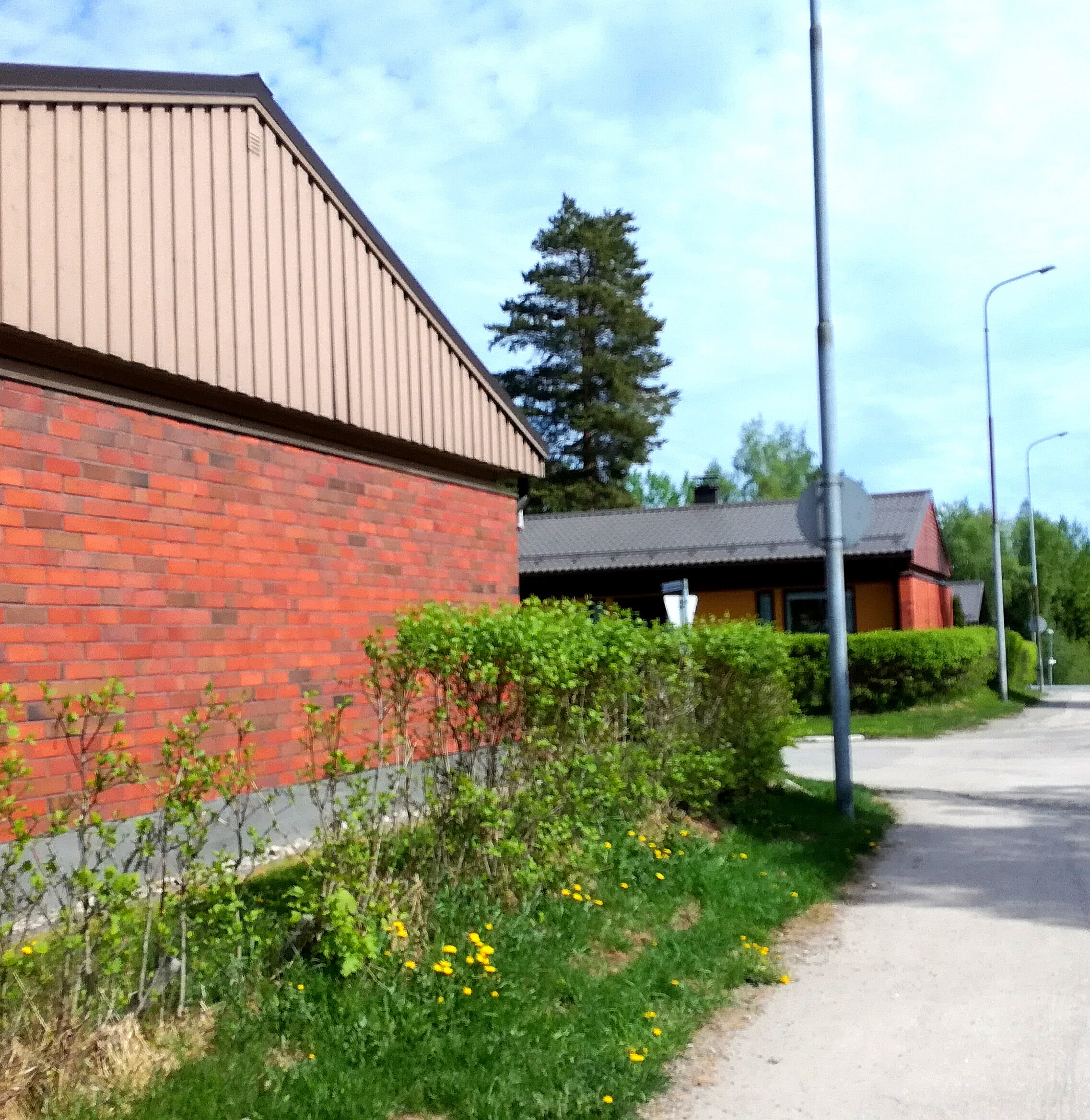
Single-family houses in Kaakkolampi.

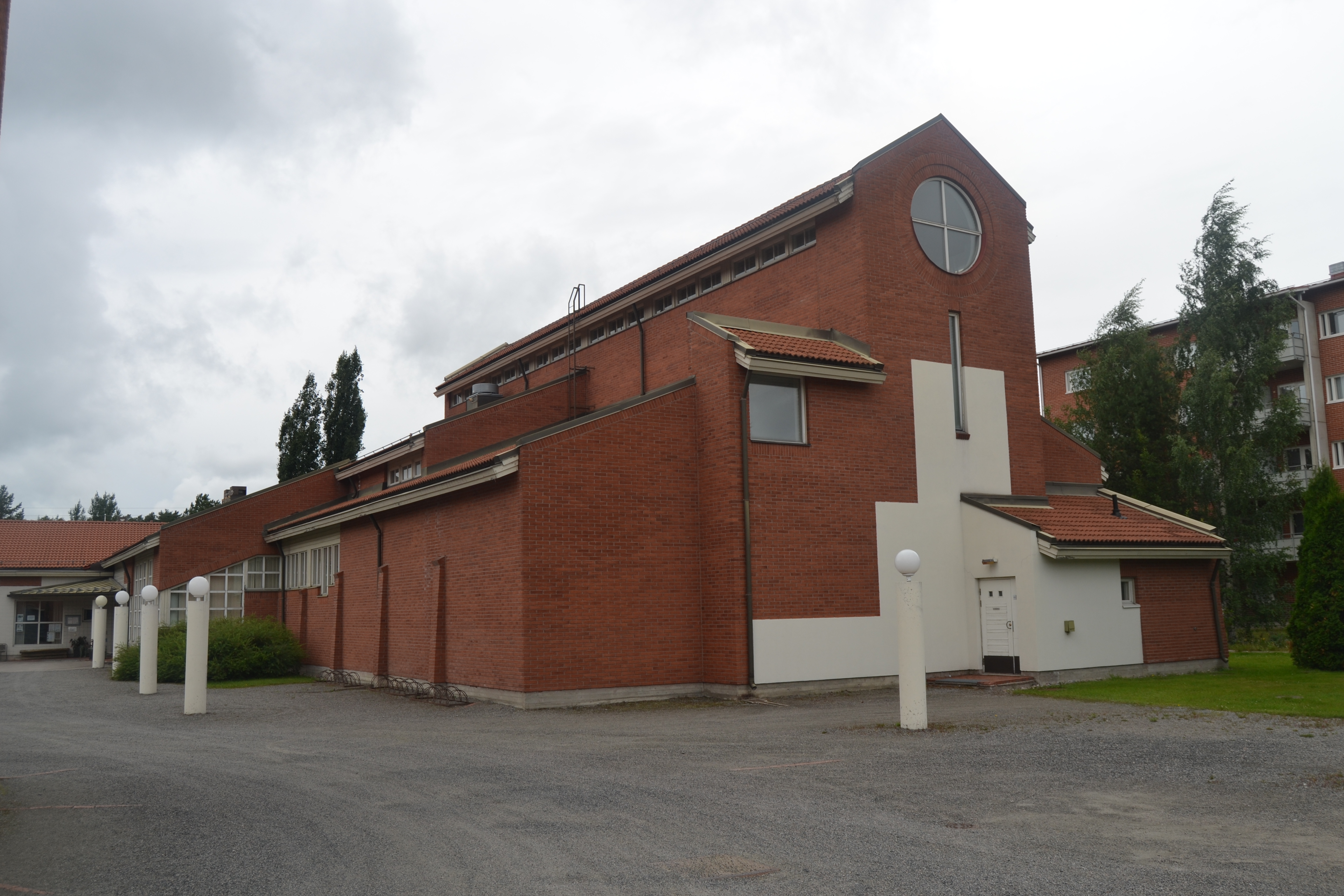
The Huhtasuo church was closed in 2017 because of building-related symptoms.

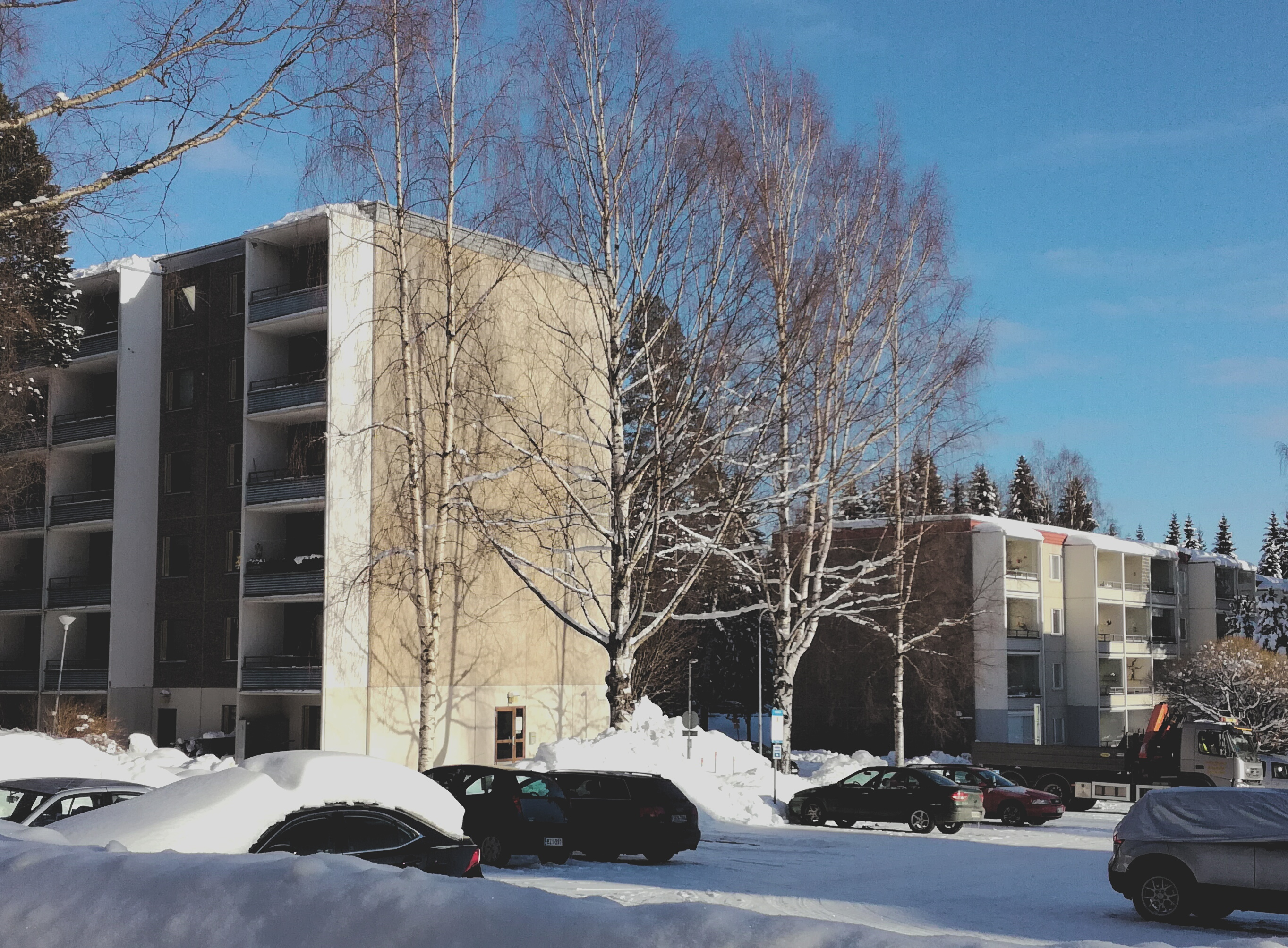
Residential buildings in Sulku.

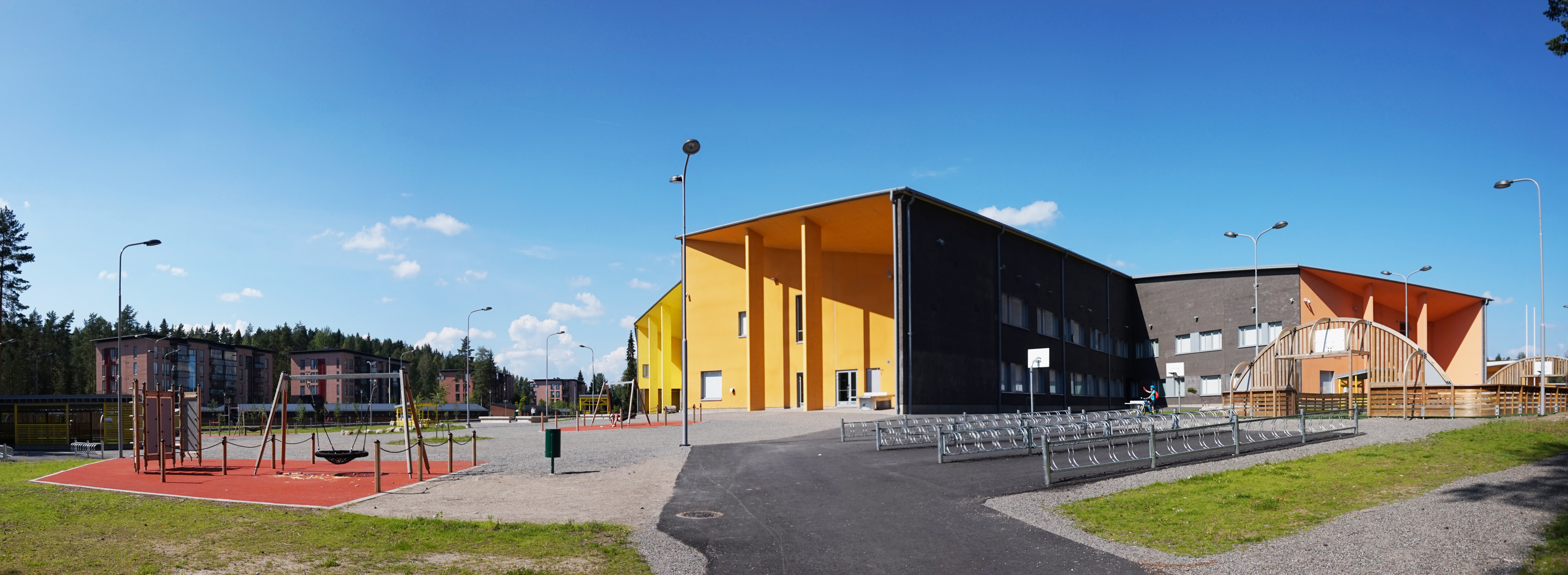
The Huhtasuo school.
