= Soaring Eagle Casino =

Casino and Resort in Mount Pleasant, Michigan

Coordinates: 43.608167°N 84.712567°W

Soaring Eagle Casino & Resort
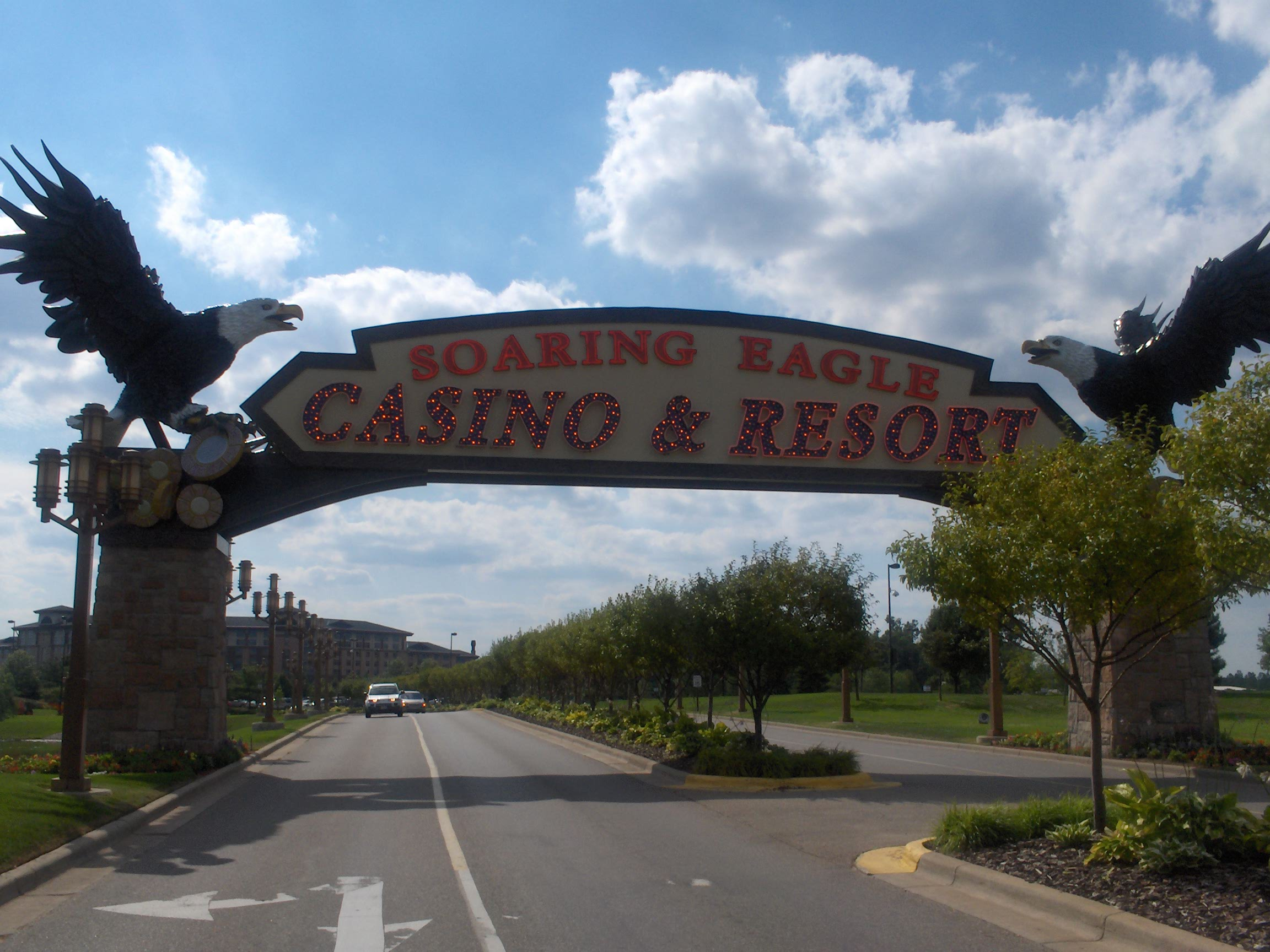
- Main entrance to resort (c.2006)
- Interactive map of Soaring Eagle Casino & Resort
- Location: Isabella Indian Reservation; 6800 Soaring Eagle Blvd, Mount Pleasant, Michigan 48858-8432
- Opened: April 22, 1998
- Gaming space: 210,000 sq ft (20,000 m^{2})
- Notable restaurants: Siniikaung Bistro; Ruth’s Chris; Chicken Guy!; Bubbakoo’s Burritos; Ike’s Love & Sanwiches; Bonanno’s New York Pizza Kitchen; Johnny Rockets
- Owner: Saginaw Chippewa Tribal Nation
- Renovated in: 2018
- Website: Casino Website

The Soaring Eagle Casino & Resort is a casino, hotel, and entertainment venue located near Mount Pleasant, Michigan, United States. It is owned and operated by the Saginaw Chippewa Tribal Nation.

== Features ==
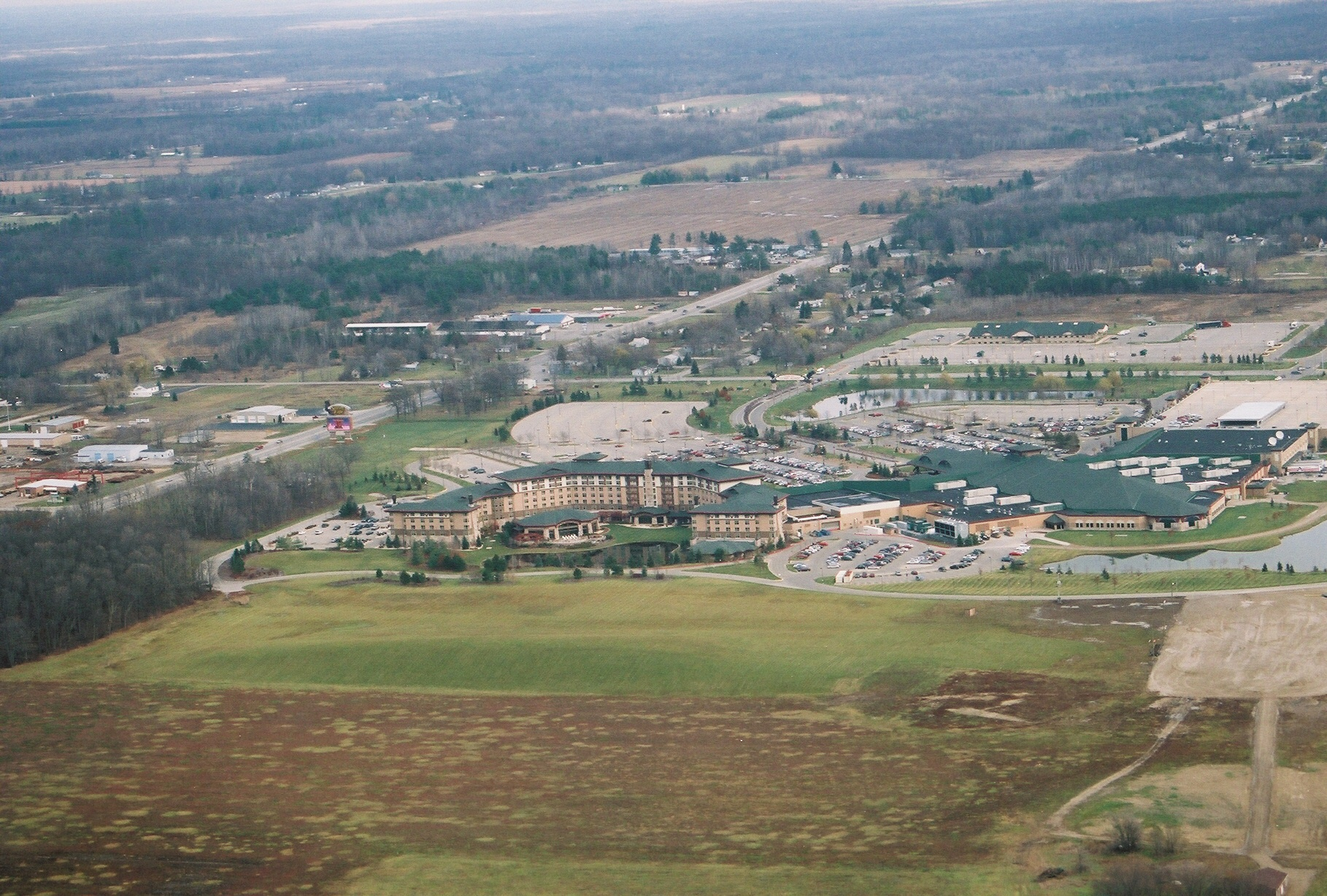
Aerial view of the casino, 2008.

Soaring Eagle Casino offers a typical selection of pit and table games such as:

- Blackjack
- Single-Deck Pitch Blackjack
- Baccarat
- Roulette
- Craps
- Three Card Poker
- Let It Ride
- Mississippi Stud
- Criss-Cross Poker
- Crazy 4 Card Poker
- Ultimate Texas Hold'em
- Jackpot Hold'em

In addition to slot machines in the main casino, an additional gaming hall called the "Slot Palace" is located across the street and offers Bingo, Keno, and additional slot machines.

The casino also includes an 18-table poker room, which features games such as Texas hold 'em, seven-card stud, and Omaha hi-low. The poker room also features a bad beat jackpot and weekly Texas hold 'em tournaments.

The resort includes eight restaurants, a pool with an underwater sound system, a full-service spa, an arcade, a day care, a concert hall, and an amphitheater.

In 2022, the casino introduced sports betting, and subsequently launched the online casino and sports betting platform Eagle Casino & Sports, becoming the last of Michigan's 15 federally-vetted Indian tribes to launch an online betting platform. In 2023, the casino became smoke-free.

== Venues ==
Entertainment

- The Entertainment Hall: Former bingo hall converted into a concert venue in 2000.
  - Capacity: 3,260 reserved seating, 3,285 general admission
- Soaring Eagle Outdoor Arena: Amphitheater that opened in 2005. Hosts the annual "Outdoor Concert Series"
  - Capacity: 5,089 reserved, 11,000 general admission

Meeting rooms

- Saginaw Chippewa Ballroom
- Three Fires Room
- Ojibway Room

== Renovations ==
In July 2017, a series of renovations were approved by the Saginaw Chippewa Tribal Council. The plans include incorporating a new sports bar and night club near the gaming floor called the Ascend Sportsbook & Lounge, updating the Entertainment Hall, enclosing the non-smoking area, re-designing the Kid's Quest and Cyber Quest areas, a new high-limit and VIP lounge area, a relocated poker room and re-branding of the current sub shop. Social distance adjustments were made in the aftermath of the coronavirus.

== See also ==
- List of casinos in Michigan
