= Yaamava' Resort & Casino =

Casino in San Bernardino, California

Coordinates: 34.1503°N 117.2293°W

Yaamava' Resort and Casino
- Interactive map of Yaamava' Resort and Casino
- Location: 777 San Manuel Blvd Highland (Note: The casino has a Highland address as that is the recommended "city name" for the 92346 ZIP Code. However, the casino is entirely within San Bernardino city limits.), CA 92346
- Opened: July 24, 1986
- No. of rooms: 432
- Gaming space: 290,000 sq ft (27,000 m^{2})
- Signature attractions: Yaamava' Theater; Serrano Spa
- Notable restaurants: The Pines Modern Steakhouse; Serrano Buffet; The 909 Food Hall
- Casino type: Land
- Owner: Yuhaaviatam of San Manuel Nation
- Previous names: San Manuel Indian Bingo; San Manuel Indian Bingo and Casino; San Manuel Casino
- Renovated in: 2021
- Website: http://www.yaamava.com

Yaamava' Resort and Casino at San Manuel (formerly San Manuel Casino) is a tribal casino and hotel on the San Manuel Indian Reservation in San Bernardino, California. It is owned by the Yuhaaviatam of San Manuel Nation. Opened as a bingo hall in 1986 and renamed in 2021, it has more than 7,500 slot machines, a 17-story, 432-room hotel and the 3,000-seat Yaamava' Theater.

== History ==
The original San Manuel Bingo opened on July 24, 1986. In 1994, the bingo hall was expanded to a casino with slot machines and card games. The facility was renamed San Manuel Indian Bingo and Casino. Further expansion occurred with the passage of Proposition 5 in 1998 and Proposition 1A in 2000, which authorized the state to sign compacts with Indian tribal governments to expand tribal gaming. The bingo hall was closed in 2017 and replaced with slot machines.

In a case regarding unionization of the casino's employees, the Federal Court of Appeals found, "for many years, the Tribe had no resources, and many of its members depended on public assistance. As a result of the Casino, however, the Tribe can now boast full employment, complete medical coverage for all members, government funding for scholarships, improved housing, and significant infrastructure improvements to the reservation." Some employees are members of the Communication Workers of America Local 9400.

In 2021, the facility was renamed Yaamava' Resort and Casino at San Manuel, in conjunction with opening a 432-room, 17-story hotel tower, the hotel. The hotel and the theater were part of a $760 million expansion of the property. Yaamava is the Serrano word for "spring" and the tribe has stated it is a metaphor for rebirth of the casino. Another reason for the name change was to disambiguate the efforts of the San Manuel Gaming and Hospitality Authority, the entity which runs the Palms Casino Resort, which the tribe purchased in 2021 and reopened in 2022.

Overnight guests who cannot be accommodated at Yaamava' can stay at the Bear Springs Hotel, approximately two miles away, also owned by the tribe. The hotel was the designated overnight accommodations for the casino prior to the opening of the resort.

In April 2025 the tribe changed its name from the San Manuel Band of Mission Indians to the Yuhaaviatam of San Manuel Nation. The property marked its 40th anniversary on July 24, 2026.

== Entertainment ==
In March 2022, Yaamava's entertainment chief, Drew Dixon, signed a partnership with Live Nation to book touring artists during time off from their tours. It was reported by the Los Angeles Times that Yaamava' pays millions of dollars to artists to play there, comparable to the amount they earn at arena shows. The next month, the Yaamava Theater opened a 3,000-seat concert venue with a 3,800-square-foot stage, with Red Hot Chili Peppers being the inaugural act. All shows at the Yaamava Theater are open to fans over the age of 21.

== Casino ==
The casino floor covers two levels with more than 7,500 slot machines, the most of any casino in California and the western United States, and over 150 table games, including blackjack, baccarat, pai gow poker, Mississippi Stud, Three Card Poker and Ultimate Texas Hold ‘em. Five high-limit rooms, including The Enclave, The Vault and Lotus 8 Palace hold more than 500 high limit slot machines and about 40 high limit table games, with table limits of up to $25,000.

== Hotel and spa ==
The 17-story hotel tower opened on December 13, 2021, with 432 rooms and suites, including invitation-only Cloud Villa Suites on the top floor. The third floor holds a pool deck with private cabanas and the Serrano Spa, which has eight treatment rooms and a full-service salon in more than 22,000 square feet and has held a Forbes Travel Guide Five-Star rating since 2023. The property has more than 20 restaurants and bars, including The Pines Modern Steakhouse, The 909 Food Hall and Serrano Buffet.

== Awards and recognition ==
- Yaamava' was named Property of the Year – North America at the 2024 Global Gaming Awards Americas.
- In the 2023 Forbes Travel Guide Star Awards, the Serrano Spa received a Five-Star rating and the hotel and The Pines Modern Steakhouse each received Four-Star ratings and all three have retained their ratings through the 2026 awards.
- AAA awarded the hotel a Four Diamond rating in 2023 and added it to its Five Diamond list in December 2024.
- In USA Today’s 10Best Readers’ Choice Awards, it was voted the best casino outside Las Vegas, and The Pines the best casino restaurant, in 2023, 2024 and 2025.
- The World Casino Awards named it California’s Best Casino in 2021 and 2022 and North America’s Best Casino in 2023.
- The Pines Modern Steakhouse holds Wine Spectator’s Best of Award of Excellence.
