= Foxwoods Resort Casino =

Hotel and casino complex in Connecticut

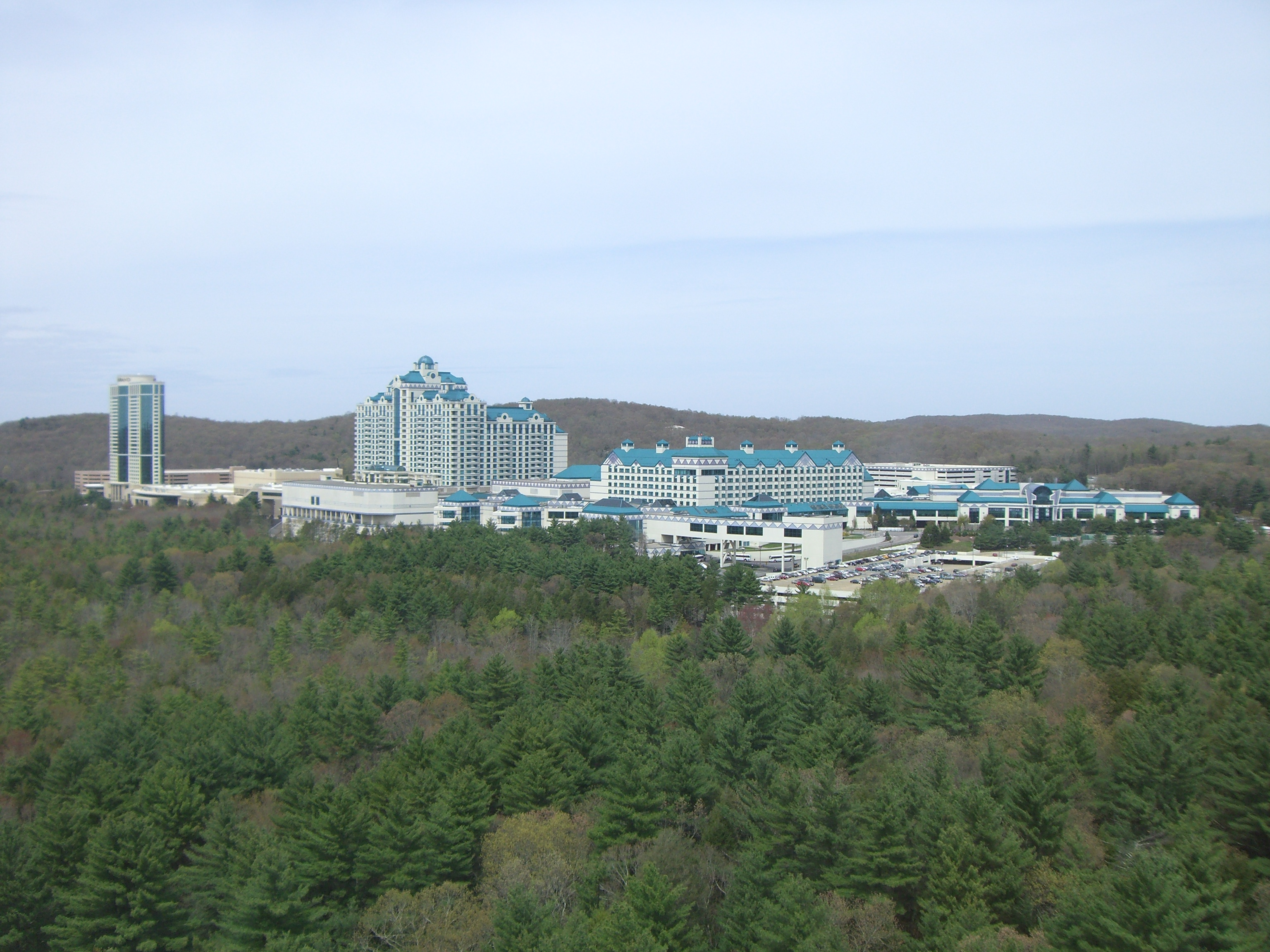
- Interactive map of Foxwoods Resort Casino
- Location: Mashantucket Pequot Tribe Reservation; 350 Trolley Line Boulevard Ledyard, CT 06338; 41°28′26″N 71°57′29″W
- Opened: July 5, 1986 (bingo); February 15, 1992 (casino); 1997 (hotel)
- Theme: Native American
- No. of rooms: 2,228
- Gaming space: 344,000 sq ft (32,000 m^{2})
- Casino type: Land-based
- Owner: Mashantucket Pequot Tribe Nation
- Previous names: Mashantucket Pequot Bingo Hall (1986–1992)
- Renovated in: 1992, 1994–1997, 2002–2003, 2005–2008
- Website: Property Website

Foxwoods Resort Casino is an integrated resort owned and operated by the Mashantucket Pequot Tribal Nation on their reservation located in Ledyard, Connecticut. Including six casinos, the resort covers an area of 9,000,000 sq ft (840,000 m^{2}). The casinos have more than 250 gaming tables for blackjack, craps, roulette, and poker, and have more than 5,500 slot machines. The casinos also have several restaurants, among them a Hard Rock Cafe. It has been developed since changes in state and federal laws in the late 20th century enabled Native American gaming on the sovereign reservations of federally recognized tribes.

Foxwoods has two hotel towers, with a total of 2,228 hotel rooms, and an arcade for children and teens. The original tower, Great Cedar was opened in 1992, and the second tower, called the Grand Pequot Tower, opened in 1997, while the third opened in 2008 as the MGM Grand. It was re-branded the Fox Tower in 2013. In 2015, a retail complex, known as the Tanger Outlet Mall, opened between the two hotel towers, with 85 stores featuring luxury goods.

== History ==
The Mashantucket Pequot Tribe gained federal recognition and legal control of their reservation by an act of Congress in 1983, which overrode a veto by President Ronald Reagan. The tribe moved forward with development. They founded Foxwoods in 1986 as a high-stakes bingo hall on their reservation.

The tribe partnered with Lim Goh Tong, a Chinese Malaysian who founded the only legal casino in Malaysia, for financing to expand Foxwoods into a full gaming casino.

In 1992, the tribe added table games, followed by additional slot machines in 1993. G. Michael Brown became the chairman of the casino in 1993. In an agreement negotiated with the state of Connecticut, to gain their approval of the casino, the tribe agreed to pay 25 percent of the slot revenue to the state, a sum that amounted to almost $200 million per year as of 2007. In the fiscal year ending June 2008, Foxwoods' 6,300 slots handled more than $9.1 billion. In January 2012, the "hold" was $45 million. A poker room and a high-limit 30-table game area were added in 1995.

Because Foxwoods is located on sovereign Mashantucket Pequot land, it is not required to comply with state laws related to smoking. Constructed in 1996, the casino is not a smoke-free facility. Due to complaints in the early 21st century from patrons and employees, it has designated many common areas, such as hallways, walkways, hotel lobbies, retail stores, and most restaurants, as non-smoking areas. In addition, it has designated certain areas for smokers. The poker room is non-smoking, and separate table gaming and slot areas are designated as non-smoking.

In 1997, the associated deluxe Grand Pequot Tower was opened for business.

Foxwoods was once reported to be the world's largest casino, though it was later surpassed by the Venetian Macau.

=== Debt default ===
For years after opening in 1992, Foxwoods had a monopoly on casino gambling in the region. It made billions of dollars in profits. Shortly before the market recession of 2008, Foxwoods borrowed heavily to finance a massive expansion to include new hotel and conference facilities. Starting in 2009, Foxwoods defaulted on debts totaling over two billion dollars. As a result, in 2014 Standard & Poor's lowered Foxwoods' credit rating. The Mashantucket Pequot, owners of Foxwoods, have applied for and received millions of dollars in federal grants.

== Design ==
Over time, the casino management achieved full build-out of the resort by hiring several design and construction entities. The majority of the work from 1992 to 2001 was completed by Construction Managers CR Klewin aka Klewin Building Co. and the Architect of Record was JCJ Architecture (formerly Jeter, Cook & Jepson) of Hartford, Connecticut. Planning and concept designs were by New England Design Inc. and Nick606 Inc. Later phases were completed by Shawmut Design & Construction, Perini Building Co., AZ Corporation, and others, with design work by Steelman Partners, HKS, Inc., and others. The resort managers revamped the whole resort and casino, re-branding it as "The Fox".

The resort's appearance inspires frequent comparisons or references to it as the "Emerald City", after the city seen in the film The Wizard of Oz.

== Gaming ==
Games available at Foxwoods include:

- Traditional "big table" Baccarat (Punto Banco style) and "Mini-Baccarat", where a dealer handles the cards. In both variants the casino banks the game.
- Bingo, with a bingo hall able to accommodate up to 5000 players.
- Blackjack with 6- or 8-deck shoes. A variant called Spanish 21 is also played. The casino offers a rare "Dollar blackjack" table (minimum bet is $1).
- Craps.
- Keno drawings.
- A money wheel in the Fox Tower
- Pai gow is offered in the Asian gaming section of the Rainmaker Casino.
- Sic Bo, an Asian game with three dice in a shaker, is also played in the Asian gaming section.
- Table variants of poker (played against the house) include Caribbean Stud Poker, Casino war, Crazy 4 poker, High Five poker, Let It Ride, Pai Gow Poker, Texas Hold 'Em bonus, and Three card poker.
- Roulette: Almost all of the wheels are of the American variety (with two green spots, 0 and 00), although there are a few European-style wheels with only one zero.
- Slot machines: It has 3,500 slot machines.
- Stargazer Room: The VIP room. This section requires a minimum of 20,000,000 coins in your account.
- A race book facility with a cafe. Bets may be made on Jai-Alai. They may also be made on a total of more than 60 tracks (combined) for dog racing and horse racing. Races are projected on 50-foot (15 m) high digital screens.

=== Poker (formerly WPT World Poker Room) ===
The Poker Room (formerly known as the WPT-World Poker Tour World Poker Room until 2012) (Note: As of 2012 Foxwoods no longer has any affiliation with the World Poker Tour.) is located one floor below the Rainmaker Casino. Poker games of varying stakes are conducted here, including limit and no-limit Texas hold 'em, limit and pot-limit Omaha hold 'em (including hi/lo), and seven-card stud (high only and hi/lo).

The poker room was relocated and expanded in March 2006, increasing the number of tables from 76 to 114, making it the largest poker room outside California. It is the third-largest poker room in the world, after the Commerce Casino and the Bicycle Casino.

=== Sporting events / entertainment ===
Tony DeMarco, Jimmy Burchfield Sr. and Harold Lederman in the ring at Fox Theatre, Foxwoods Resort Casino.

Since 2014, three major mixed martial arts events have been held at Foxwoods: UFC Fight Night: Jacaré vs. Mousasi, World Series of Fighting 20: Branch vs. McElligott and, most recently, World Series of Fighting 24: Fitch vs. Okami.

== Fox Tower ==
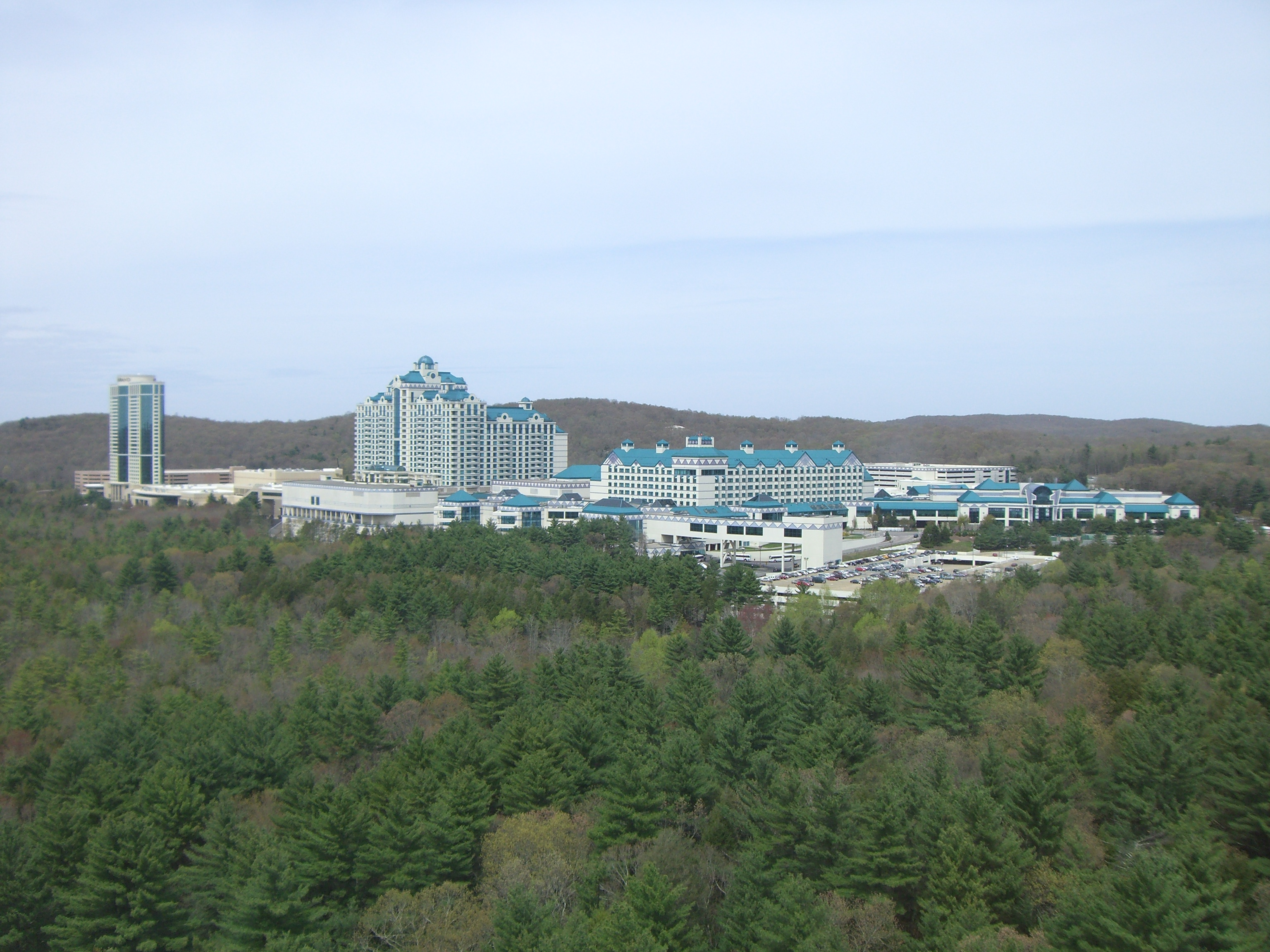
Foxwoods Resort, 2009

Construction started in November 2005 on a $700 million expansion at Foxwoods. On April 25, 2006, Foxwoods announced that they would lease the MGM Grand brand name for the new building, and that MGM Mirage would be a partner in the expansion project. The expansion, entitled MGM Grand at Foxwoods, opened on May 17, 2008. It is a separate building from the main Foxwoods resort. A moving walkway and Tanger Outlets Foxwoods (built in 2015), now connect the two complexes. Amenities at the MGM Grand at Foxwoods included:

- 53 table games
- 1,400 slot machines
- 825 hotel rooms/suites
- 4,000 seat performing arts theater
- Four restaurants and four retail outlets

In late 2013, MGM Mirage split from Foxwoods. The tribe renamed the building The Fox Tower, part of a re-branding effort as they face new competition from other casinos in the region.

In 2015, Tanger Outlets Foxwoods opened within the complex, located between the two hotel towers. Constructed for $120 million, the 85-store mall features luxury brands.

=== Attractions ===
Ride name	Manufacturer	Model
Amusement rides
HighFlyer Zipline	Soaring Eagle Rides	Soaring Eagle Zipline Ride
Monza World-Class Karting	On Track Karting/PGK Designs	Go-Karts
XD Dark Ride		Dark ride

== Restaurants ==
- California Pizza Kitchen
- Gordon Ramsay's Hell's Kitchen
- David Burke Prime Steakhouse
- Guy Fieri's Foxwoods Kitchen + Bar
- Hard Rock Cafe
- High Rollers Luxury Lanes & Sports Lounge
- Cedars Steakhouse & Oyster Bar
- Johnny Rockets
- Sugar Factory American Brasserie
- Wingstop
- Wahlburgers
- Regina Pizzeria
- Alta Strada
- Momosan
- The Bedford by Martha Stewart

== Unionization of employees ==
Beginning with an employee-led website to gain support and share ideas of how to react to changes employees had been going through, a small base of employees approached several union organizations to explore unionizing of dealers at Foxwoods Resort Casino. After the dealer group decided on the United Auto Workers in June 2007, the UAW helped start collecting signatures from dealers in support of a union. The UAW announced in September 2007 that it had collected the requisite number of signatures needed to hold an election to determine whether table games and poker dealers desired union representation or not.

The Tribe challenged the jurisdiction of the National Labor Relations Board for their on-reservation Native American enterprises. Following hearings and review of the petitions, the NLRB ruled in favor of the union and ordered a union election to be conducted. On November 24, 2007, employees voted to unionize: 60 percent were in favor and 40 percent were against. The Foxwoods dealers cast 1,289 ballots for the union, 852 against representation, with challenges to 36 additional ballots. Approximately 2,700 dealers and dual-rate dealers were eligible to vote in the election.

After the workers won the right to unionize, Foxwoods Casino appealed the election results, reasserting its jurisdictional challenge. In addition, it said that the NLRB had made mistakes in conducting the vote. It had printed the ballot only in English and provided notices explaining the election in only one form of the Chinese language, thereby disenfranchising workers who spoke other languages. Furthermore, it said that interactions between union officials and some voters were unlawful. An NLRB Administrative Law Judge ruled that the union and the board provided ample explanation of the election in a variety of languages. Foxwoods appealed the decision.

The Foxwoods dealers' union asked the state of Connecticut to improve the conditions of their workplace. Workers and union organizers pushed for legislation to ban smoking on the casino floors of Foxwoods and Mohegan Sun. The Mashantucket tribe opposed a complete ban on smoking; however, in May 2009 Connecticut Governor M. Jodi Rell signed an agreement with Foxwoods by which they would limit smoking areas in the casino.

On January 26, 2010, dealers at Foxwoods reached a labor contract with the Mashantucket Pequot Tribe. They are the largest group of union-represented dealers at any U.S. casino. On August 7, 2013, the union announced a tentative new contract that would give dealers retroactive and future raises, set stricter limits on second-hand smoke, and give dealers the right to decide how tips are distributed.

In April 2018, an additional 300 cleaning and maintenance workers voted to join the UAW.

== See also ==
- Gambling in Connecticut
- List of casinos in the United States
- Mashantucket Pequot Museum and Research Center
- Mohegan Sun—Connecticut's other casino
- Native American gaming
- List of integrated resorts
