= Southland Casino Racing =

Combination greyhound race track and casino in West Memphis, AR, US

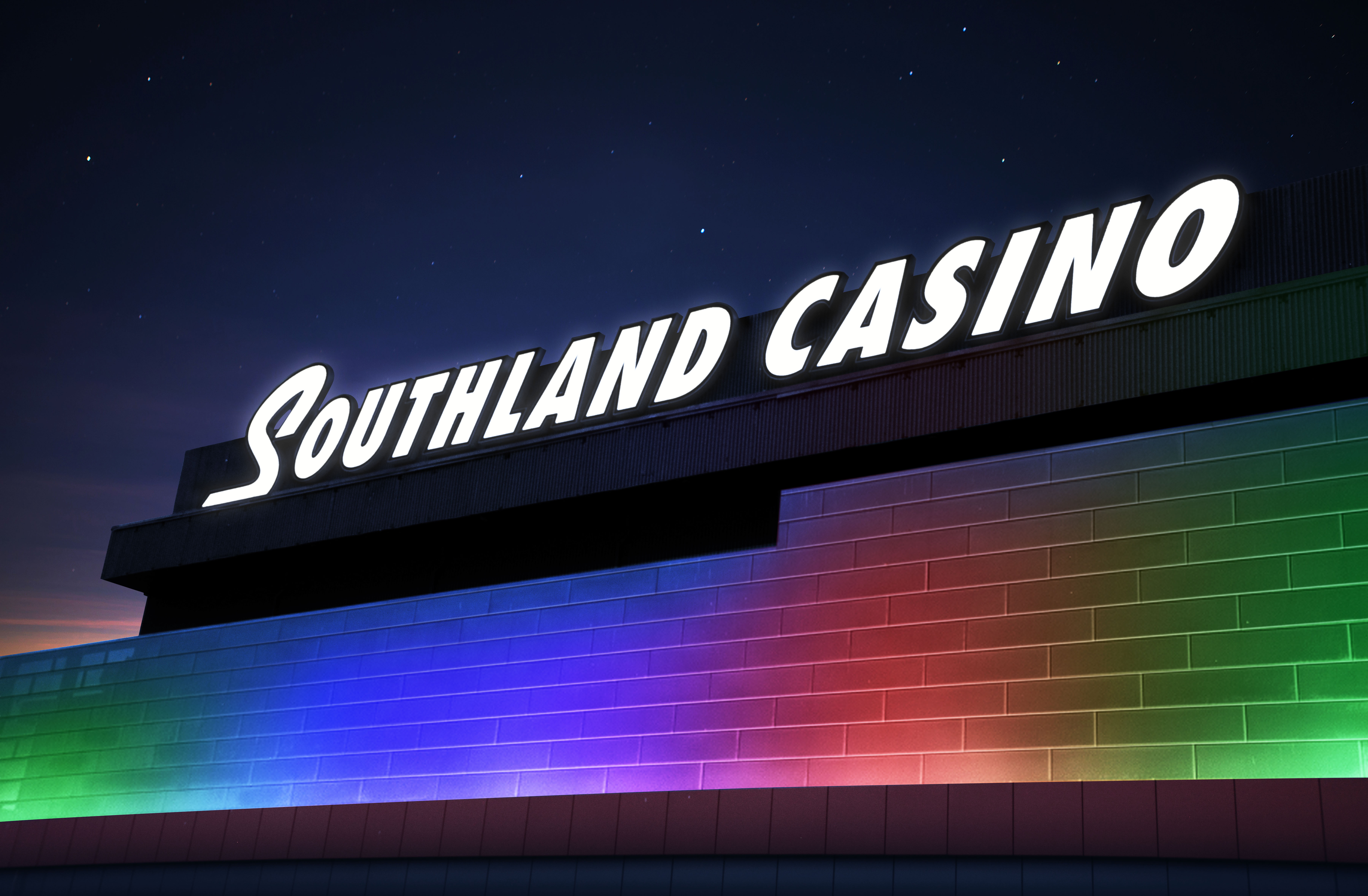

Southland Casino Racing (formerly Southland Greyhound Park and Southland Park Gaming and Racing) is a casino in West Memphis, Arkansas. Simulcast thoroughbred horse races from other tracks around the United States are also offered, along with greyhound racing from West Virginia.

The venue has been expanded through the years, and with the decline in greyhound racing, shifted from being solely a racing track to becoming a full-fledged casino, finally expanding to such in April 2019 after the constitutional amendment allowed it to do so. It made it the closest casino to Memphis, Tennessee across the Mississippi River. Because of this, it is one of West Memphis's largest attractions.

== History ==
Southland Park began as a dog racing track in 1956. At its opening in 1956, Southland became Arkansas's only greyhound racetrack, following in the tradition of the earlier Riverside Kennel Club, which was the first greyhound track in West Memphis. Riverside had been located at the Arkansas end of the Mississippi River bridge between West Memphis and Memphis, Tennessee, and proved to be a popular diversion. Based on that popularity, Southland was established after the demise of Riverside. Originally owned by the Upton family and other individuals, Southland was purchased by Delaware North Companies, Inc., based in Buffalo, New York, in the early 1970s. In the 1993 film The Firm, Southland appears as the backdrop for a pivotal scene between Tom Cruise and Ed Harris.

In 2019, it was announced that greyhound racing would cease at Southland by December 2022. The last greyhound race was held on December 31, 2022.

== Casino ==
Prior to April 1, 2019, the state of Arkansas did not use traditional slot machines; all games offered were "electronic games of skill," which was defined by section 10.17 of the Final Rules of the Arkansas Racing Commission Regulations for Franchise Holders Operating Electronic Games of skill as "game(s) played through any electronic device or machine that affords an opportunity for the exercise of skill or judgment where the outcome is not completely controlled by chance alone." At that time, the state of Arkansas did not permit live table games, but Southland Park did have electronic versions of Blackjack, Craps, Roulette, Three Card Poker, Ultimate Texas Hold'em and Mississippi Stud.

As of April 1, 2019, Southland became a full casino pursuant to Amendment 100 to the Constitution of Arkansas, approved by voters in 2018. As such, it now has live versions of blackjack, craps, and other games, as well as sports wagering; it may also have traditional slot machines, though many of the former "electronic games of skill" machines continue to operate under its casino license.
