= Hard Rock Casino (video game) =

- PlayStation 2 cover art
- Developer: List: MumboJumbo (computer versions) Jamdat Mobile (mobile version) FarSight Studios (PlayStation versions)
- Publisher: List: Jamdat Mobile (Windows and mobile versions) MacPlay (Macintosh) PlayStation versions Crave Entertainment (North America) Oxygen Games (Europe)
- Producer: Stacey Ganem
- Designer: Bobby King
- Artist: Tom Green
- Composer: Nelson Everhart
- Platforms: Microsoft Windows; Macintosh; Mobile phone PlayStation 2 PlayStation Portable
- Release: 2003–07: Windows NA: 2003 Macintosh NA: January 2004 Mobile NA: 2004 PlayStation 2 NA: November 28, 2006 EU: April 2007 PlayStation Portable; NA: April 24, 2007; EU: April 2007
- Genre: Gambling
- Modes: Single-player, Multiplayer

Hard Rock Casino is the title of several gambling video games released between 2003 and 2007, and based on the Hard Rock Cafe brand. The first Hard Rock Casino game, developed by MumboJumbo and published by Jamdat Mobile for Microsoft Windows, was released in the United States in 2003. The game was subsequently published by MacPlay for Macintosh in the United States, in January 2004. Later in 2004, Jamdat Mobile developed and published a version for mobile phones in the United States.

In July 2005, Crave Entertainment announced an agreement with Hard Rock International to create Hard Rock Casino video games. FarSight Studios developed Hard Rock Casino for the PlayStation 2 (PS2), and Crave Entertainment published the game in the United States on November 28, 2006. FarSight Studios also developed a version for the PlayStation Portable (PSP), which Crave Entertainment released in April 2007, in North America. In Europe, the PlayStation versions were published by Oxygen Games during the same month. The PlayStation versions of Hard Rock Casino received generally negative reviews, according to Metacritic.

== Gameplay ==
The computer versions of Hard Rock Casino include blackjack, craps, keno, and poker. The mobile version starts the player off with $5,000, and includes three casino games: blackjack, poker, and a slot machine.

The PlayStation versions feature four casinos and 22 casino games, including slot machines, poker, blackjack, roulette, craps, baccarat, pai gow, Let It Ride and Casino War. The player is given body type and clothing options to create a customized player character. The game includes a story mode in which the player tries to win enough money to gamble at high roller casinos. To progress through the story mode, the player must play and win the various gambling games to advance from one casino to the next casino. The PSP version includes a wireless multiplayer option.

== Reception ==
Reception

Aggregate score
Aggregator	Score		
Aggregator	mobile	PS2	PSP
Metacritic		45/100	44/100

Review scores
Publication	Score		
Publication	mobile	PS2	PSP
Eurogamer			3/10
GameSpot	6.9/10		
GamesRadar+		1.5/5	
GameZone			6.6/10
IGN	7/10	4.5/10	4.5/10
Pocket Gamer			4/10

The PlayStation versions of Hard Rock Casino received generally unfavorable reviews, according to Metacritic. Reviewers criticized the PlayStation versions for their simple gambling games and repetitive gameplay, with Rob Fahey of Eurogamer stating that none of the games were "particularly fun to play." Reviewers noted that some of the games were played by pushing a single button. Reviewers also criticized the gambling games' graphical user interface, with some comparing it to a flash game.

IGN's Chris Roper, reviewing the PlayStation versions, called the game a "poor attempt at a decent idea." Roper stated that the "biggest problem" with the game was the lack of instructions in the manual and the in-game career mode; instructions are instead accessed from the game's main menu. Mark Walbank of Pocket Gamer, reviewing the PSP version, stated that the game could not match the feeling of a real casino and "as a consequence it all feels rather flat and functional." Louis Bedigian of GameZone praised the graphics of the PSP version and wrote that it "is presented and implemented more efficiently than any other casino game collection," while noting that the casino games were "simple, random fun" and "the replay value is higher than any standalone poker game."

Levi Buchanan of IGN praised the graphics of the mobile version, but stated that there were better versions of each gambling game available elsewhere. Carrie Venetia of GameSpot reviewed the mobile version and was disappointed by the minimal casino sound effects, and wrote that the game "is a wonderful value, but it's also very straightforward," stating that it "won't surprise or impress in any way."
