= Derek Webb (businessman) =

British businessman and campaigner

- Occupations: Businessman; Campaigner
- Known for: Creating Three Card Poker; Funding campaigns for gambling regulation

Derek Webb (born June 1950) is a British businessman, former professional poker player and campaigner for tighter gambling regulation. He invented Three Card Poker and owned Prime Table Games, which marketed and licensed casino table games. Galaxy Gaming acquired the company's assets in 2011. He later financed commercial litigation in the gambling industry.

Webb founded and financed the Campaign for Fairer Gambling, which campaigned to reduce the maximum stake on fixed-odds betting terminals (FOBTs), electronic gaming machines in betting shops, from £100 to £2. The government announced the reduction in 2018 and implemented it in April 2019. He has since financed campaigns and research advocating tighter regulation and higher taxation of online gambling. He was Labour's fifth-largest individual donor between 2023 and the 2024 general election.

In 2011, Webb called for lower taxes and fewer restrictions on casinos, while advocating tighter regulation of bookmakers. Some bookmakers accused him of favouring casino interests, while his political spending and lobbying also drew criticism.

== Early life ==
Webb grew up in Derby, where his father worked for Rolls-Royce. He took up poker as a teenager and became a professional player, competing internationally.

== Business career ==
=== Three Card Poker ===
Webb devised Three Card Poker in 1994 and began promoting it to American casinos in 1996. Webb obtained a patent for the game in 1997. By 2009, it was offered at more than 1,600 tables in US casinos and cardrooms. He marketed it through Prime Table Games. In 1999, Shuffle Master acquired most of the distribution rights to Three Card Poker, while Webb retained the rights in the United Kingdom.

In 2011, Galaxy Gaming acquired Prime Table Games' assets in a deal announced at $23 million, including the British rights to Three Card Poker that Webb had retained. Webb was a Galaxy shareholder when the transaction was announced and still held shares in 2018.

=== Litigation ===
Webb's dispute with Progressive Gaming International, formerly Mikohn Gaming, concerned patents relating to Three Card Poker and alleged anticompetitive conduct. After Progressive sued him for patent infringement, Webb sued the company, arguing that it had sought to exclude his game from the Mississippi market. A federal jury found in his favour in 2007, and Progressive settled the case that November for $20 million plus legal fees.

In 2008, Webb and Prime Table Games sued Shuffle Master, which had previously acquired distribution rights to Three Card Poker, bringing antitrust, contract and patent claims. The parties settled in December 2010 under an agreement that also licensed intellectual property to Shuffle Master.

Webb later financed litigation brought by other companies. In 2015, he funded plaintiffs in an antitrust case against Scientific Games, whose subsidiary supplied FOBTs. The case itself concerned automatic card shufflers. In December 2018, Scientific Games agreed to pay the three plaintiff companies $151.5 million to settle the case without admitting liability. Webb described his financing as "an investment" and "a bet".

== Gambling policy campaigns ==
In 2011, Webb submitted proposals to Parliament on behalf of the Fairer Gambling Campaign, calling for lower casino taxes, fewer restrictions on casinos, tighter regulation of betting shops and protection against unauthorised use of proprietary games. In 2013, he said that finding an altered version of Three Card Poker on FOBTs had prompted him to fund campaigning rather than pursue legal action.

The Campaign for Fairer Gambling launched Stop the FOBTs in 2013, seeking to cut the maximum stake on betting-shop terminals from £100 to £2. It used a 2014 study by NERA Economic Consulting to challenge bookmakers' warnings of shop closures and job losses, and later sponsored ResPublica's 2017 report Wheel of Misfortune, which also recommended a £2 limit. Both reports were criticised by bookmakers. The government announced the reduction in May 2018, and it took effect on 1 April 2019. The campaign also advocated lower casino taxes and fewer restrictions on casinos. Peter Craske of the Association of British Bookmakers criticised these proposals, while some bookmakers accused Webb of acting in casinos' interests, but he denied the allegation.

Webb has financed the Social Market Foundation (SMF), a policy think tank, and two campaign groups: Clean Up Gambling and the Coalition to End Gambling Ads, which opposes gambling advertising and sponsorship. Matt Zarb-Cousin ran the Campaign for Fairer Gambling and later led Clean Up Gambling. Webb also financed Gamban, a commercial provider of gambling-blocking software co-founded by Zarb-Cousin.

Webb retained SMF researcher James Noyes as an adviser. In 2019, he said he had funded Noyes's work with the office of Labour deputy leader Tom Watson on proposed gambling legislation. He also said he had funded legal assistance for Gambling with Lives, a charity supporting families bereaved by gambling-related suicide. Christopher Snowdon, a researcher at the Institute of Economic Affairs, wrote in The Critic that Webb also financed Peers for Gambling Reform.

The Campaign for Fairer Gambling relaunched in 2023 with a focus on US online gambling policy, retaining consultants for federal and state-level work.

In 2024, Webb commissioned an SMF report by James Noyes proposing to raise Remote Gaming Duty, a tax on online gaming revenue, from 21% to 42%. Webb had contributed up to £40,000 to the think tank over two years. The report helped bring higher gambling taxes onto the political agenda.

In December 2024, Clean Up Gambling called for separate regulation of horseracing bets and online casinos, including exempting racing bets from affordability checks. In a January 2025 email, Zarb-Cousin proposed to "peel off and neutralise racing" by distancing the partly bookmaker-funded sport from opposition to online-casino restrictions. The SMF convened racing representatives at a meeting chaired by Noyes in May and proposed higher online-gaming taxes, lower duty on racing bets and increased bookmaker levy payments. The November 2025 Budget raised Remote Gaming Duty to 40% from April 2026 and excluded bets on British horseracing from a planned increase in remote betting duty.

A 2026 study commissioned by the Campaign for Fairer Gambling from Gaming Compliance International estimated gross gaming revenue (stakes minus winnings) from online sports betting and casino games in Great Britain at about £800 million for unlicensed operators and £8 billion for licensed operators in 2025. The study estimated year-on-year growth of 33% and 5%, respectively. Webb argued that the unlicensed market, estimated at under 9%, had less impact in Britain than in other major jurisdictions. The Betting and Gaming Council argued that even this share posed serious risks and warned that tighter regulation could drive customers to unlicensed sites.

== Political donations and parliamentary funding ==
Webb's campaign clashed with Conservative MP Philip Davies, who represented Shipley. Following a complaint by the Campaign for Fairer Gambling, Davies was found in 2013 to have breached the parliamentary code of conduct by failing to declare hospitality from Ladbrokes during parliamentary proceedings on gambling, although he had registered it in the Register of Members' Financial Interests. Davies complained about the campaign's anti-FOBT advertisements, and the Advertising Standards Authority upheld his complaint on appeal in 2014. Before the 2015 election, Webb donated £25,000 to the local Labour Party organisation in Davies's constituency. In 2016, Davies accused Webb and his associates of "sheer vindictiveness".

Webb donated £25,000 to the Liberal Democrats by 2013 and a further £250,000 during the 2024 general-election campaign. He also donated £1.3 million to the Labour Party between 2023 and the election, making him its fifth-largest individual donor during that period.

Webb also financed all-party parliamentary groups (APPGs), informal groups of MPs and peers. By January 2023, he had provided £120,000 to the APPG on Gambling Related Harm. In 2025–26, Webb's campaign paid public-affairs firm DGA Group to run the secretariat of the Gambling Reform APPG.

Christopher Snowdon argued in The Critic in 2024 that Webb's spending on lobbying for tighter gambling laws deserved more scrutiny than the smaller gifts from gambling companies that had attracted media attention. In The Spectator two years later, Rupert Hawksley questioned Webb's shift from selling casino games to campaigning for restrictions and accused the anti-gambling lobby he funded of putting ideology ahead of reason.
