= Caesars Palace 2000 =

Simulation video game

- North American Dreamcast cover art
- Developer: Runecraft
- Publisher: Interplay Entertainment
- Platforms: PlayStation; Dreamcast; Microsoft Windows
- Release: PlayStation: EU: June 16, 2000; NA: June 29, 2000; Dreamcast: EU: June 16, 2000; NA: September 20, 2000; Microsoft Windows: NA: June 2000
- Genre: Gambling simulation
- Modes: Single-player multiplayer

Caesars Palace 2000 is a gambling simulation video game developed by Runecraft and published by Interplay Entertainment. It was released in North America and Europe in 2000 for the PlayStation, Dreamcast and Microsoft Windows' PCs. It is named after the famous Caesars Palace luxury hotel and casino on the Las Vegas Strip in Las Vegas, Nevada.

Interplay announced in late 1999 that they were working on a title for the Dreamcast which was known to be a 3D simulation of gambling with traditional casino games. The game was fully licensed by the Caesars Palace casino and features six card games, table games, five slot machine themes, and video game machines. Each game plays by official Caesars Palace rules and uses casino odds and payouts verified by a Ph.D. in statistics. The PC version of the game received praise for its graphics and sound, but the Dreamcast version received criticism for its presentation, graphics, and slow pace.

== Gameplay ==
The roulette table in the Dreamcast version. The display box at the top shows the player's name and the current amount of money the player has. The display box at the bottom shows the current actions the player can take.

There are eleven casino games, authentic Caesars Palace cards, chips, rules, and tutorial guides for beginners throughout each game. In the PlayStation version of the game, there are six card games, including variations of poker and blackjack; table games, including roulette and craps; video game machines, including video poker and keno; and five slot machine themes. For each of the various games included, official Caesars Palace tables and equipment are used. Each game plays by official Caesars Palace rules and uses casino odds and payouts confirmed by statistician William Bertram, Ph.D. Tutorials and in-game hints can be shown on each of Caesar's Palace 2000: Millennium Gold Edition's various games. The tutorials and hints are displayed at times when the game notices that the player is making moves considered incorrect by casino standards. For further assistance, Caesar's Palace 2000: Millennium Gold Edition also features the Caesars Palace Guide to Gaming Handbook, which details rules and strategies for the included games.

In the PC and Dreamcast versions of the game, an initial stake of $2,000 is given, though more is available through loans at a virtual automated teller machine. Official Caesars Palace rules and tutorials are given for each game, along with genuine cards and chips. Odds and payouts are confirmed by Bertram. The card games include blackjack, Pai gow poker, Mini-Baccarat, Red dog, Casino war, and Spanish 21. The table games include craps and roulette, while machine gambling include video poker, poker challenge, and video Keno. The five slot machine themes include Ancient Egypt, Baseball Challenge, Halloween Spooky, Progressive Fruit, and Wild West. They all have different payouts and odds. The settings can be customized for some games, including the volume, coaching, number of decks, card tracking, bet limits, and animations.

== Development ==
In September 1999, publisher Interplay Entertainment announced the arrival of several Dreamcast titles to be developed by Rage Software. Interplay revealed that they were working on another title, known as Caesars Palace 2000 for the Dreamcast. It was known to be a 3D simulation of gambling, and they promised that it will be "one of the most realistic portrayals of the casino atmosphere ever". It was going to have traditional casino games, like blackjack, poker, and slots, and was slated for a late fourth-quarter release in 1999.

In May 2000, developer Runecraft was simultaneously working with publisher Ripcord Games on the Dreamcast port of Spec Ops, while developing Caesars Palace 2000. It was announced that the game was set for release on the PC, Dreamcast, and PlayStation. They promised to include all the things associated with gambling, and a release in late May 2000. The game was fully licensed by the Caesars Palace casino, with twenty-three different gambling games and adhering to the Official Caesars Palace Rules. Runecraft promised a title that "reflects the ambiance of Caesars Palace, including dealers with personality". Players would also be able to track their performance and do some statistical analysis.

== Reception ==
Reception

Aggregate score
| Aggregator | Score |
|---|---|
| GameRankings | 55% (PC); 45% (DC) |

Review scores
| Publication | Score |
|---|---|
| AllGame | 3/5 (PC); 3/5 (PS); 1.5/5 (DC) |
| GameSpot | 4.4/10 (PC); 2.4/10 (DC) |
| IGN | 7.2/10 (PC); 5/10 (PS); 2.5/10 (DC) |

Caesars Palace 2000 received mixed reviews from critics, while the PC version received the most positive reaction. It received aggregate scores of 55% and 45% from GameRankings for PC and Dreamcast respectively.

For the PC version, GameSpot editor Stephen Poole stated "You'll be better off looking for free online versions of the various games contained in Caesars Palace 2000". In contrast, IGN was more favorable to the PC version of the game. Francois Laramee of Allgame praised the game for its "excellent audio-visuals. The 3D accelerated graphics, specifically the tables, the cards and the dealers' hands, are well modeled and lit, and the playing chips are beautiful. The sound effects are accurate, and the voice actors, competent". However, he noted that "some of the 3D effects are not particularly wieldy, the menus flicker, it's often hard to stop the scrolling menus at the right time, and the camera angles switch too fast and frequently to be anything but distracting. The slot machine wheels are a bit on the small side and difficult to read". Laramee went on to call the game "a competent effort, but is essentially dry and uninspired". ComputerAndVideoGames.com's Alex Huhtala criticized the game for its "Poor, vomit-inducing presentation".

For the PlayStation version, IGN's David Zdyrko cited that "Many of the games are quite enjoyable, but the truth of the matter is that it never quite matches the thrill of the real thing" and criticized on how "the visuals are very bland on the whole. It has low-resolution backgrounds, and pretty much nothing at all to get excited about". He also called the music "boring and completely uninspiring". Allgame editor Matt Grandstaff commended the card games, as they "require a fair amount of strategy, and thus remain entertaining" and that "the look and feel of Caesars Palace 2000 recaptures the feel of one of the most successful casinos of all-time". He stated that the game "is definitely not about the looks" but "does an admirable job recreating the casino experience". Grandstaff felt that the game "has the sound of a real casino. From background clatter to the voices of the dealer, this is Caesar's Palace". He noted that players "will enjoy sitting through hours of card games" but to "Avoid the slots". Grandstaff also commented that the strategy book that comes with the game "should be packed on any trip to Vegas".

The Dreamcast version was heavily criticized. Ryan Davis of GameSpot stated that "the best bet for all involved would be to take your chips elsewhere". Similarly, IGN editor Jeremy Dunham noted that "the blandness of the game's presentation would probably disappoint the most basic of cavemen. Even the graphics are disappointing. True, those card tables can look very realistic, but what else is there to marvel at? Nothing! Without any type of exploration feature, or other characters there isn't anything to render". Allgame's Bryan Hightower criticized that "there are not enough games, there are annoying wait times, and the help mode is terrible". He also complained that "the dealer deals painfully slow and has to say what cards you have twice. You can already read your hand right on the screen, so you don't need the dealer to waste your time". Hightower also cited that "when you win at slots, the camera always goes to the bottom of the machine to show you the payout scale" which "becomes frustrating after a few credits because it is so slow. The act of leaving the table or machine is even slower". He also said that the advice the game gives you is "Perhaps the most irritating 'feature' of this game" because "Each time you do something the computer wouldn't have done, a pop-up screen will appear that adds more time to the lengthy procedure of completing a bet". Hightower commented that "The above-par graphics are quickly negated by the rock-bottom enjoyment factor" and that "this game doesn't have any of the character the real casino has".
