= PGIC =

PGIC may refer to:

- Patient global impression of change, a measure of effectiveness used in medical studies, such as for testing the effectiveness of gabapentin
- Progressive Gaming International Corporation, a defunct casino game-making company previously known as Mikohn Gaming that went bankrupt in 2009
- Undecaprenyl phosphate N,N'-diacetylbacillosamine 1-phosphate transferase, a.k.a. PglC, with the letter 'l' (lowercase of 'L') mistaken for the letter 'I' (uppercase of 'i')
