= Derek Webb (disambiguation) =

Derek Webb (born 1974) is an American singer-songwriter.

Derek Webb may also refer to:

- Derek Webb (businessman) (born 1950), British businessman and inventor of Three Card Poker
- Derek Webb, British playwright and author of Bringing Back the Bluestones
