= David Robbins =

David Robbins may refer to:

- David B. Robbins (born 1959), American investor
- Dave Robbins (trombonist) (1923–2005), American-Canadian trombonist, composer, and teacher
- Dave Robbins (basketball) (born 1942), American basketball coach
- David P. Robbins (1942–2003), American mathematician
- David L. Robbins (Oregon writer) (born 1950), American fiction and non-fiction writer
- David L. Robbins (Virginia writer) (born 1954), American writer of historical fiction
- David Robbins (composer) (born 1955), American composer of film soundtracks
- David Robbins (artist) (born 1957), American artist and writer
