= Wizard of odds =

Wizard of Odds may refer to:

- Michael Shackleford (born 1965), expert on the math behind casino games
- Donald Angelini (1926–2000), Chicago gambling mobster
- The Wizard of Odds, a 1973 television game show starring Alex Trebek
