= Deck Mate =

Card shuffling machine

Deck Mate was a shuffling machine, designed by SHFL entertainment in 2002, used by casino poker rooms to assist dealers in shuffling. The original machine can shuffle a deck in approximately 45 seconds. SHFL entertainment had a virtual monopoly over shuffling machines and generally rented them out to casinos for about $US500 a month.

In 2013, SHFL entertainment was acquired by Bally Technologies. In August 2014, Bally agreed to be acquired by Scientific Games, now Light & Wonder.

== Deck Mate 2 ==
In 2012, SHFL entertainment released Deck Mate 2 which can shuffle a deck in 22 seconds and includes card recognition, allows operators to call the "clock", and has a remote touchscreen display. The latest card shuffling device from Light & Wonder is the MDX, with the capability to shuffle up to 10 decks simultaneously.
