= Santos Manuel =

Mission Indians chief (1814–1919)

Paakuma (1814 – October 25, 1919) known by his Spanish-language name Santos Manuel, was the Captain (chief) of the San Manuel Band of Mission Indians (now known as the Yuhaaviatam of San Manuel Nation).

== Life ==
Santos Manual was born in a village in the Bear Valley region of the San Bernardino Mountains in the 1810s. An alternative account from a visitor to the reservation in 1896 gave his age as 57, which would make his birth year closer to 1839. The 1900 Census lists his birth year as 1833.

After gold was discovered in Holcomb Valley in the 1860s, an influx of Americans came to the area. American settlers formed militias after the deaths of some settlers, that were not caused by the Yuhaaviatam. However, the settlers did not distinguish between the Native Americans, causing heavy losses to Yuhaaviatam in the thirty-two day campaign. In 1866, Santos Manuel led the remaining members of the clan (fewer than 30) to the San Bernardino Valley floor to the banks of Warm Creek (a tributary of the Santa Ana River). Later, the tribe moved to Harlem Springs (roughly near the intersection of Victoria and Base Line in Highland, California). Here, they were "pushed out by the white men," and were forced north to land that was barely arable, or as a newspaper put it in 1903, land that "the white folks had declined."

In about 1882, the tribe moved to its present location in the foothills of San Bernardino. Contemporary accounts often refer it to "Manuel's Village" and "Santa Manuel" On January 12, 1891, the 55th Congress passed "An act for the relief of the Mission Indians in the State of California." President Benjamin Harrison established the San Manuel Reservation in 1891. The reservation originally consisted of 640 acres (one square mile), most of which were foothills. Of those, 13 acres were tillable.

Under Santos Manuel, the Yuhaaviatam attempted to keep their traditions alive, including a traditional system of justice on the reservation.

Santos Manuel and his men participated in the Tournament of Roses in Pasadena on January 1, 1902.

An election was held and Tom Manuel (Santos' son) was elected captain in an election held in 1909.

Flat land was purchased for the reservation, but it took until 1910 to get it irrigated with water from the North Fork Canal east of the reservation.

Among the white population of the San Bernardino Valley, Santos Manuel was "well respected by his white neighbors."

The Special Indian Census of 1913 showed that the reservation had 60 inhabitants, but that declined to 50 by the 1916 Special Indian Census.

Santos Manuel would sometimes participate in society off the reservation, like when he, his son Thomas and his interpreter Pete Brown attended the 30th Anniversary meeting of the Pioneer Society of San Bernardino

About a year before his death, he was taken to Bear Valley by a party of men who were looking to locate some old monuments. Cold weather overtook the party and Santos Manuel became ill, the effects of which lingered until his death.

Santos Manuel died on October 25, 1919, at the San Manuel Reservation, and was buried in the reservation cemetery with Catholic and Native rites on October 27, 1919.

== Family and legacy ==
The 1900 Census lists his family as Maria Catalina, wife, born 1833, married 1866, son Pomocono, born 1866, son Ignacio, born 1883, died September 11, 1925, and son Alessandro, born 1876. Pomocono Manuel predeceased Santos on April 13, 1916. Son Thomas Manuel was born in 1864 and succeeded Santos Manuel as leader. Santos' grandson, and Thomas' son, Roy Manuel, succeeded Thomas Manuel as leader until his death in 1937. Other successors to Santos Manuel as leader include his great-granddaughter Chairwoman Geraldine Campos (great-granddaughter), Chairman Ken Ramirez (great-great-grandson). His great-great grandson, James Ramos is a member of the California Assembly.
