= Yuhaaviatam of San Manuel Nation =

Native American tribe in Southern California

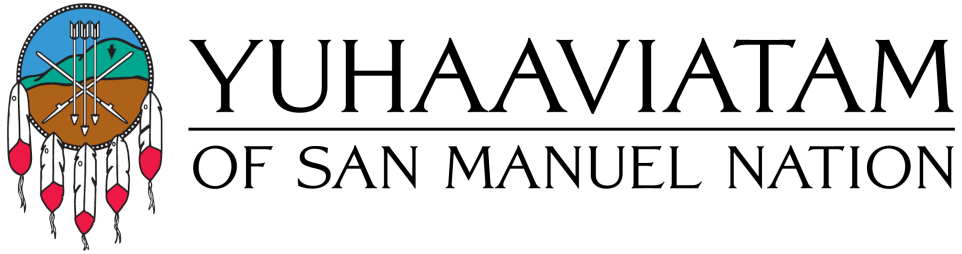

Total population
- 200

Regions with significant populations
- United States (California)

Languages
- English, Serrano

Related ethnic groups
- other Serrano people

The Yuhaaviatam of San Manuel Nation is a federally recognized tribe of Serrano people in San Bernardino County, California.

They are made up of the Yuhaaviatam tribe of Serrano people, who have historically lived in the San Bernardino Mountains. The tribe was formerly named the San Manuel Band of Mission Indians.

The other federally recognized Serrano tribe is the Morongo Band of Mission Indians, located in San Bernardino County, California.

== Government ==
The Yuhaaviatam of San Manuel Nation is headquartered in Highland in San Bernardino County. The tribe is governed by a democratically elected, seven-person tribal council. Their current [when?] tribal chairperson is Lynn Valbuena.

== Reservation ==
Location of San Manuel Reservation

San Manuel Reservation is a federally recognized Indian reservation in San Bernardino County. Originally, it was 658 acres (266 ha) in size, but has expanded to 800 acres (320 ha). Established in 1891, the reservation was named for Santos Manuel, a prominent tribal leader.

== Economic development ==
=== Businesses ===
The Yuhaaviatam of San Manuel Nation employ more than 7,000 employees in the Inland Empire region of California. They own and operate Yaamava' Resort & Casino, Serrano Buffet, The Pines, Chingon's Kitchen, Tutu's Food Court, and Big Mo's, all located in San Bernardino.

On May 4, 2026, the Yuhaaviatam of San Manuel Nation announced a deal to purchase The Mission Inn Hotel & Spa in Riverside.

=== Philanthropy ===
In December 2016, the tribe arranged the lighting of their Arrowhead landmark, a California Historical Monument, for 14 nights, in honor of the 14 victims killed by domestic terrorists the year before in San Bernardino. Together with the Morongo Band of Mission Indians of Southern California, the San Manuel Band made a "joint donation totaling $600,000 to the San Bernardino United Relief Fund shortly after the shooting last year."

In 2019, the tribe made a donation of $25 million to the Loma Linda University Children’s Hospital. In honor of the donation, the fifth floor of the children's hospital is slated to be named the San Manuel Maternity Pavilion. In 2020, the band made a $9 million gift to the University of Nevada, Las Vegas. The gift was to be used for education and innovation related to tribal gaming operations and law.

In 2025, the tribe endowed $3 million to the public university, California State University San Marcos. This built on a previous endowment from 10 years before which went towards the launch of the California Indian Culture and Sovereignty Center.

=== Casinos ===
The Yuhaaviatam of San Manuel Nation own and operate Yaamava' Resort & Casino which was renovated in 2016.

On October 4, 2021, at Global Gaming Awards Las Vegas 2021, the Yuhaaviatam of San Manuel Nation won the "Responsible business of the year" award and were runners-up for the "property of the year award" for the Yaamava Resort & Casino.

On December 17, 2021, The tribe purchased Palms Casino Resort near the Las Vegas Strip in Paradise, Nevada, for $650 million. Palms Casino Resort subsequently became the first Las Vegas resort to have a Native American owner.

== Education ==
The reservation is served by the San Bernardino City Unified School District.

== See also ==
- Indigenous peoples of California
- Mission Indians
- Serrano people

== Notes ==
=== References ===
- Pritzker, Barry M. A Native American Encyclopedia: History, Culture, and Peoples. Oxford: Oxford University Press, 2000. ISBN 978-0-19-513877-1
