= Mississippi Stud =

Casino table game

Mississippi Stud is a casino table game based on poker introduced by Scientific Games.

== Gameplay ==
Like other poker-based table games, such as Caribbean stud, Let It Ride, and Three Card Poker, Mississippi stud is a "house-banked" game, meaning the players are playing against a house dealer, not other players at the table as in other poker games. Unlike the other house banked games, Mississippi stud hands are not compared to a dealer's hand, but only against a payout table that pays out on the result of the player's hand. In this regard it is similar to video poker.

In Mississippi Stud, each player first places an ante bet to buy into the game. The dealer then deals two hole cards face down to each player and three community cards face down at the middle of the table. A player may then fold, forfeiting their ante, or they may continue by raising their bet by an amount of one to three times their ante, known as the "3rd Street" bet. The first community card is then turned over, and the players may fold or make another raise, the "4th Street" bet. The second community card is then turned, and the final "5th Street" round of betting proceeds as before. After that the final community card is revealed, and the players are paid out based in the payouts below:

=== Payouts ===
Payout schedule
Hand	Payout
Royal flush	500 to 1
Straight flush	100 to 1
Four of a kind	40 to 1
Full house	10 to 1
Flush	6 to 1
Straight	4 to 1
Three of a kind	3 to 1
Two pair	2 to 1
Pair of Jacks or better	1 to 1
Pair of 6s thru 10s	Push
All other	Loss

In this regard, if the player was dealt a pair, 6 or higher in his two hole cards he will at least get a push and if it is a pair, jack or better the player automatically wins.
