= Relativity Media =

American media company

Relativity Media, LLC
- Type: Subsidiary
- Industry: Conglomerate; Digital; Film; Media
- Genre: Independent films
- Founded: May 18, 2004; 22 years ago
- Founders: Lynwood Spinks; Ryan Kavanaugh
- Headquarters: Beverly Hills, California, United States
- Key people: Lex Miron (Co-CEO); Ryan Kavanaugh (CEO); David B. Robbins (Chairman)
- Products: Motion pictures; Music; Media; Television; Sports
- Services: Acquisitioning; Film development; Film production; Film distribution
- Owner: UltraV Holdings
- Number of employees: Approximately 350 (2013)
- Divisions: Studios; Home Entertainment; Television; International; Sports; Digital Studios; Relativity Music Group; Animation
- Subsidiaries: Madvine; Trigger Street Productions; R2 Entertainment; RED (Relativity EuropaCorp Distribution) (joint venture with EuropaCorp); Rogue Pictures
- Website: relativitymedia.com

Relativity Media, LLC is an American independent digital media and film production company founded on May 18, 2004 by Lynwood Spinks and Ryan Kavanaugh. The company brokered film finance deals and later branched into film production and other entertainment ventures. The company was commercially successful prior to bankruptcy.

In 2015, Relativity Media filed for Chapter 11 bankruptcy after lawsuits and missing loan payments. The bankruptcy was noted as one of the most notorious in entertainment industry history. As a result, the company began selling off previously acquired films. Relativity Media reorganized and emerged from bankruptcy in March 2016, but in May 2018 it filed for bankruptcy again. The studio is now a wholly owned subsidiary of UltraV Holdings.

== History ==
=== Launch and operations ===
Relativity Media was founded by Ryan Kavanaugh and Lynwood Spinks in 2004. Kavanaugh convinced Spinks, a former Carolco Pictures executive to invest $1 million into the venture. Relativity began operations as a middleman brokering deals between film studios and banks, private equity firms, and hedge funds to finance multi-film slates. In 2005, the funding needs of Hollywood studios became more critical when a German tax shelter that had supported them for 25 years was eliminated, and Relativity Media met that need with Wall Street's plentiful funds in the early 2000s. Relativity arranged financing for slates produced by Warner Bros., Universal Pictures, and Sony Pictures. For each film, Relativity received equity and brokerage fees of $500,000 to $1 million, and Kavanaugh arranged an executive producer credit for himself.

In 2007, Kavanaugh sued Spinks after the partners had a falling out.

In 2008, Elliott Management bought 49.5% of Relativity Media for $67 million and provided access to about $1 billion in capital and a revolving credit line. The increased funds allowed Relativity to expand involvement with film production companies. In 2009, Relativity reached an output deal with Lionsgate, and bought Rogue Pictures from Universal Pictures for $150 million. In 2010, a deal with Netflix allowed Relativity Media-owned films to be streamed on the platform, and Relativity purchased Overture Films' distribution and marketing operations.

Elliott Management's funding eventually allowed Relativity Media to begin operating its own studio, producing and distributing its own films. The studio distributed its first film on December 3, 2010.

In 2011, Elliott Management pulled its financial backing from Relativity amid reports of tension between the companies. In May 2011, Relativity's president Michael Joe moved to Elliott Associates to manage their investment in Relativity after Elliott had invested hundreds of millions of dollars with very little in return. Kavanaugh had structured a slate deal between Elliott and Universal titled "Beverly 2" that comprised the majority of Elliott's investment in Relativity at the time, but the investment turned out poorly for Elliott and further enormous losses were forecasted. Relativity was also scheduling their own movies opposite Universal's, including competing Snow White adaptations, which Universal executives saw as Relativity using "Beverly 2" funds to gain a competitive advantage. Elliott put pressure on Kavanaugh to hand Beverly 2 over to Elliott in exchange for releasing Michael Joe from his non-compete. Two weeks before the opening of Relativity's first big-budget epic Immortals, Elliott reportedly threatened to further reduce its investment unless Kavanaugh made significant concessions when Relativity was already short on funds.

Relativity took out a $200 million loan from Ron Burkle, who had other entertainment investments including with Bob and Harvey Weinstein through his associated firm Colbeck Capital. The loan was taken in part to cover the multi-million dollar marketing costs for Immortals. In January 2012, as Relativity continued to struggle financially, Kavanaugh sought a new major investor, and Burkle, and his invested between $600 million and $800 million and became a shareholder.

In May 2012, Relativity announced that Colbeck structured $350 million in debt financing for the company, with Elliott departing from its investment in the company. Later that month, it signed a co-production and co-financing deal on two movies with EuropaCorp that Relativity would distribute in the United States. Relativity also has co-production deals with Atlas Entertainment including Project.

On June 12, 2012, Relativity Media and Rogue sold 30 of their films to Manchester Library Company, which was acquired by Vine Alternative Investments in April 2017.

In July 2012, Relativity merged its Rogue Sports, a Maximum Sports Management basketball agency, a football agency, and SFX Baseball into Relativity Sports. Relativity Sports represented more than 400 clients including Amar'e Stoudemire.

In 2013, hedge fund investor Carey Metz made a $10 million investment in Relativity Media based on what he later described as Ryan Kavanaugh's lies.

In April 2013, Relativity partnered with Glenn Kalison to create a film and performing arts school called Relativity School. In 2014, the company signed a deal with EuropaCorp to launch a distribution partnership, Relativity EuropaCorp Distribution, where Relativity distributed movies produced by EuropaCorp.

Most of the studio's movies performed poorly at the box office. The movie slate financing Relativity Media brokered for Wall Street investors also fared poorly for equity holders.

=== 2015 bankruptcy ===
In July 2015, Relativity Media filed for Chapter 11 bankruptcy. With liabilities estimated to be between $500 million and $1 billion, and claimed assets thought to be worth only $100 million to $500 million, the company was reportedly paralyzed by its unpaid debts. The bankruptcy filing came after a last-ditch effort from investors to salvage the company by preventing Kavanaugh and Relativity from carrying out any unsupervised transactions. The Hollywood Reporter later called it "one of the most notorious Hollywood bankruptcies ever." The company would remain in U.S. Bankruptcy Court reorganizing itself for nearly eight months, until March 2016.

As a result of the bankruptcy, Relativity sold off previously acquired films, including:

- Suffragette was sold to Focus Features for North America and select international territories. Kavanaugh resigned as producer of the film.
- Jane Got a Gun was acquired by TWC.
- The Bronze was purchased by Sony Pictures Classics and Stage 6 Films.
- Love the Coopers was bought by Lionsgate and CBS Films.
- The Space Between Us and The Foreigner were sold to STX Entertainment.
- Solace was acquired by Lionsgate Premiere.
- Collide was purchased by Open Road Films.
- Kidnap was bought by Aviron Pictures.
- Before I Wake and Animal Crackers were sold to Netflix.
- Shot Caller was acquired by Saban Films.
- Hillsong: Let Hope Rise was purchased by Pure Flix Entertainment.
- Fallen and The Secret Scripture were bought by Vertical Entertainment.

Relativity's distribution rights to EuropaCorp films were transferred to STX Entertainment in January 2017.

In September 2015, three women who were involved in a Relativity Media reality show filed a lawsuit alleging the company never followed through on promises to support the women in escaping sex work and gaining improved housing, educational, medical and legal situations. The first litigant said she was paid $250 for her appearance and assured the "real" compensation would come in the form of assistance after the show. Two of the women also sued Relativity Media for not blurring their faces in footage as they had promised to do for the women. One of these women said she "has suffered incessant humiliation and embarrassment which continues to this day".

=== Reorganization ===
On January 6, 2016, Relativity Media acquired Trigger Street Productions. Owners Kevin Spacey and Dana Brunetti were given the roles chairman and president of Relativity Studios, respectively. That March, Spacey announced that he would not accept Relativity's offer; Brunetti's position is still in place.

On January 26, 2016, Relativity Television, Relativity Media's television division, became an independent company named Critical Content after the post-bankruptcy.

On March 18, 2016, the company reemerged from the supervision of U.S. Bankruptcy Court Judge Michael Wiles. In the wake of the bankruptcy, Ryan Kavanaugh chose to pay himself $2.6 million between April and November 2016 while his company failed to pay bankruptcy fees or file tax returns.

On September 8, 2016, it launched R2 Entertainment which will be based in Canada and is now an independent film distributor focused on releasing films with budgets under $15 million. It will be co-headed by Mark Kassen and Dana Brunetti.

On October 28, 2016, Kavanaugh announced that he was selling Relativity to Singapore-based social networking platform YuuZoo for $250 million. Other companies have attempted to bid, including Chinese technology company Lenovo. On March 2, 2017, YuuZoo announced they were canceling the investment in the fledgling studio saying "conditions precedent to the investment had not been met".

=== 2018 bankruptcy and sale ===
In May 2018, the company filed for bankruptcy once again and arranged to sell all of its assets. The U.S. Trustee's office expressed concern at the bankruptcy filing, saying that it appeared "designed to benefit Kavanaugh and lender UltraV Holdings at the expense of other creditors" and advocated for a robust investigation. This concern was partially based on the negligence of Relativity to satisfy even the administrative fees owed from the 2016 bankruptcy. Greg Zipes, the attorney for the U.S. trustee's office in New York wrote "the Debtors [Relativity Media] have apparently been unable to pay even the administrative claims owed under the confirmed (bankruptcy) plan" of 2016... In summary, while the Debtors appear to have raised some capital and paid down some debt, their finances are largely a mystery, apparently even to themselves." The filing from the trustee's office also uncovered the $2.6 million Kavanaugh paid himself between April and November 2016 while remaining delinquent on what Relativity owed from the bankruptcy agreement. The trustee's office also expressed concern that this 2018 bankruptcy filing might be an "arm's length transaction", as Kavanaugh continued to have inappropriate access to computer systems, email, bank accounts, and servers at Relativity after the filing stated Kavanaugh had left the company.

In June 2018, Netflix sued Relativity Media for breaching an exclusivity agreement after five films that were to be exclusively featured on Netflix were provided to Amazon and Starz. According to the suit, Netflix paid Relativity Media for licensing fees and exclusive rights to stream The Lazarus Effect, The Woman in Black 2, Beyond the Lights, And So It Goes, and Hector and the Search for Happiness, but Relativity's led to their loss of control over the titles which third parties then distributed to Amazon and Starz. Netflix also alleged Relativity Media failed to provide their contracted number of films. Relativity Media promised to provide Netflix with 22 films between 2016 and 2018, including eight in 2017, but allegedly delivered only three.

In June 2018, an arbitration case found that executives from Relativity Media, including Kavanaugh, had fabricated a memo alleging sexual harassment by a former co-president of the company. A forensic audit of Relativity Media found that the memo had been altered by a user named "kav kav". Kavanaugh stated that the finding was "patently false" and filed a counterclaim alleging a violation of the arbitration process.

Also in June 2018, investor Carey Metz filed a lawsuit against Relativity's CEO Ryan Kavanaugh alleging Kavanaugh's deceptive representations of his proprietary algorithm had defrauded Metz of $12.5 million. After a 5-year relationship with Relativity, Metz described Kavanaugh's algorithm as a poor predictive tool which Relativity used only inconsistently in determining which films to finance.

In August 2018, the US Bankruptcy court approved the sale of the company to Ultra V Holdings.

In 2020, Lex Miron, CEO of Relativity Media, announced that Come Away would be the first commercial release of the "new Relativity Media" under Ultra V Holdings. Miron gave an interview to The Hollywood Reporter about taking two years after the 2018 bankruptcy to "quietly and deliberately rebuild the studio and its industry relationships" and said Relativity Media's strategy going forward would be to focus on smaller to mid-budget films.

In May 2025, Relativity received a strategic growth equity investment from Content Partners Capital, bolstering Relativity Media's capital base for acquiring new films for theatrical distribution. Relativity intends to spend approximately $100 million acquiring domestic film rights over the next three – five years.
