= David B. Robbins =

American investor

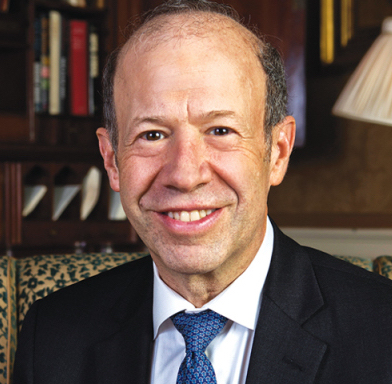
- Education: Wharton School of the University of Pennsylvania (BS); NYU School of Law (JD)
- Occupations: Attorney, hedge fund manager, investor
- Known for: Chairman of Bally Technologies, Relativity Media
- Spouse: Jill L. Robbins
- Children: 3

David B. Robbins is an American attorney, hedge fund manager, and private equity investor. He was formerly the chairman of Bally Technologies until its sale to Scientific Games in 2014 and currently serves as a managing partner in various investment partnerships, including Relativity Media, UltraV Holdings, Alexiam Capital, and Trevi Health Capital.

== Life and career ==
Robbins received his BS in Economics from the Wharton School of the University of Pennsylvania and his JD from the NYU School of Law.

Following a career as a corporate attorney, Robbins has founded and managed multiple private equity and growth capital funds, investing in media and entertainment, gaming, healthcare, and life sciences.

In 2005, Robbins co-founded Trevi Health Capital, a healthcare-focused private equity firm, with an emphasis on healthcare information and medical technology.

He served as chairman of Bally Technologies (NYSE:BYI), a publicly traded gaming equipment and technology company from 1996 until its sale to Scientific Games (NASDAQ:SGMS) in 2014.

In 2018, Robbins acquired Relativity Media, a film and television distribution and production company, through UltraV holdings, a partnership between Robbins and SoundPoint Capital.

Robbins has invested as a producer in multiple Broadway productions, most notably, Pippin, for which he received a Tony Award for Best Revival of a Musical in 2013.

== Civic engagement ==
Robbins’s family foundation focuses on medical research, with an emphasis in neurology, sponsoring research programs at the Columbia University Institute for Genomic Medicine and NYU Langone Medical Center.

Robbins is an active supporter at NYU FACES (Finding a Cure for Epilepsy and Seizures) and serves on the board of trustees for the McCarton Center (addressing autism and developmental disabilities), the steering committee for the NYU Langone Comprehensive Epilepsy Center, and Columbia University’s Precision Medicine Council.
