= EssNet =

EssNet AB was founded in Stockholm, Sweden, 1936 under the name Hugin Kassaregister AB. It was a provider of solutions to lotteries, including lottery terminals, central software and knowledge. The company has inherited a long tradition within paper handling since it was born from the old and traditional Esselte company. EssNet also provided the reading machines for lottery coupons for many years, and converted their business gradually towards modern online technology offerings from the early 1990s. In 2003 the company started a new division for gaming machines and offered a modern software based technology: EssNet Interactive. At the most EssNet had approximately 400 employees/hired consultants.

In 2006 EssNet sold the lottery-operations to Scientific Games Corporation and the gaming business to Aristocrat Technologies.
