= Volponi =

American-bred Thoroughbred racehorse (1998–2025)

- Sire: Cryptoclearance
- Grandsire: Fappiano
- Dam: Prom Knight
- Damsire: Sir Harry Lewis
- Sex: Stallion
- Foaled: April 13, 1998
- Died: February 14, 2025; South Korea
- Colour: Bay
- Breeder: Amherst Stable (Kathy Johnson)
- Owner: Amherst Stable & Spruce Pond Stable
- Trainer: Philip G. Johnson
- Record: 31: 7-12-5
- Earnings: $3,187,232

Major wins
- Pilgrim Stakes (2000); Pegasus Handicap (2001); Poker Handicap (2002) Breeders' Cup wins: Breeders' Cup Classic (2002)

Volponi (April 13, 1998 – February 14, 2025) was an American Thoroughbred racehorse, who was best known for winning the 2002 Breeder's Cup Classic.

== Background ==
Bred by trainer Philip G. Johnson's family operation, Amherst Stable, he was sired by Florida Derby winner Cryptoclearance. His dam, Prom Knight, was a daughter of the 1987 Irish Derby winner Sir Harry Lewis, who was a son of the great French runner Alleged, who won back-to-back editions of the Prix de l'Arc de Triomphe.

== Career ==
In 2002, Volponi earned the most important win of his career when he won the Breeders' Cup Classic by 6½ lengths, the largest margin in the race's history at the time. In winning the Classic, Volponi overcame odds of 44/1 to beat an outstanding field that included runner-up Medaglia d'Oro, Milwaukee Brew, Evening Attire, Macho Uno, Hawk Wing, War Emblem, and Harlan's Holiday, among others. His longshot victory inadvertently exposed the largest betting scandal in the United States in a century.

At age five, Volponi made eight starts in 2003 without a win but had five seconds and two third-place finishes.

Retired to stud duty, his offspring have met with limited success in racing. At the end of 2005, he was sent to Jeju Stud Farm in South Korea. His best runner in terms of career earnings is daughter Clearly Foxy, who won the 2007 Grade III Natalma Stakes.

== Death ==
Volponi died in South Korea on February 14, 2025, at the age of 27.

== Pedigree ==
Pedigree of Volponi, bay stallion, 1998
Sire Cryptoclearance 1984	Fappiano	Mr. Prospector	Raise a Native
Sire Cryptoclearance 1984	Fappiano	Mr. Prospector	Gold Digger
Sire Cryptoclearance 1984	Fappiano	Killaloe	Dr. Fager
Sire Cryptoclearance 1984	Fappiano	Killaloe	Grand Splendor
Sire Cryptoclearance 1984	Naval Orange	Hoist The Flag	Tom Rolfe
Sire Cryptoclearance 1984	Naval Orange	Hoist The Flag	Wavy Navy
Sire Cryptoclearance 1984	Naval Orange	Mock Orange	Dedicate
Sire Cryptoclearance 1984	Naval Orange	Mock Orange	Alablue
Dam Prom Knight 1992	Sir Harry Lewis	Alleged	Hoist The Flag
Dam Prom Knight 1992	Sir Harry Lewis	Alleged	Prince Pout
Dam Prom Knight 1992	Sir Harry Lewis	Sue Babe	Mr. Prospector
Dam Prom Knight 1992	Sir Harry Lewis	Sue Babe	Sleek Dancer
Dam Prom Knight 1992	Dancing Party	Danzig	Northern Dancer
Dam Prom Knight 1992	Dancing Party	Danzig	Pas de Nom
Dam Prom Knight 1992	Dancing Party	Irish Party	Irish Lancer
Dam Prom Knight 1992	Dancing Party	Irish Party	Party Favor (family: 16-f)

== Sources ==
- Volponi's pedigree and partial racing stats
- Volponi's complete race record
- Volponi at the Thoroughbred Times Interactive Stallion Directory
