= 2002 Breeders' Cup betting scandal =

Betting scandal

The 2002 Breeders' Cup betting scandal was an incident that arose when computer programmer Chris Harn conspired with two friends, Derrick Davis and Glen DaSilva, to manipulate bets in the 2002 Breeders' Cup, held at Arlington Park in Arlington Heights, Illinois. This enabled him to arrange a $3 million USD payout to the trio. The scam was exposed when 43-1 longshot Volponi won the Breeders' Cup Classic. This unanticipated victory made Davis the sole winner of the Pick 6 jackpot. Eventually, Harn, Davis and DaSilva pleaded guilty.

The incident was the largest betting scandal to take place in the United States in a century. It also exposed serious security flaws in the system used to collect bets for horse races.

== Background ==
Harn was a computer programmer at Autotote, which handled the wagers for 65 percent of horse races in North America at the time. In the fall of 2001, Harn discovered unclaimed ticket data that if claimed, would total hundreds of thousands of dollars. Using this data, he reprinted the unclaimed tickets so that he and his friends could claim them at local tracks. However, cashing them was another matter. As an Autotote employee, he was restricted from making wagers himself. In any event, he was too well known at the tracks to cash them.

To solve this problem, he talked DaSilva and Davis into cashing the tickets at various tracks. The three men had been friends and fraternity brothers at Tau Kappa Epsilon during their days at Drexel University. DaSilva now lived in New York City while Davis lived in Baltimore. Davis and DaSilva traveled to several tracks in New Jersey, New York, and Pennsylvania to cash the vouchers. The three men then split the winnings.

However, Harn soon realized that if they kept it up too long, they'd eventually be tracked down. He looked for a way to get one big payoff that could allow him to easily cover his tracks. He found it in the Breeders' Cup, the richest day in American horse racing. Harn decided to go for the Ultra Pick 6, in hopes of scoring a win by picking the winners of the six major races of the competition—the Classic, Turf, Sprint, Distaff, Juvenile and Mile.

== Finding a weak link ==
At the time, all wagers placed at the numerous off-track betting parlors around the country that were still live after the second race of a Pick 4 and the fourth race of a Pick 6 were forwarded to Autotote headquarters in Newark, Delaware and to the track where the race was held. Harn discovered that there was a half-hour delay between the end of the second or fourth race and when the live wagers were forwarded—enough time to alter the results. Harn was uniquely positioned to take advantage of this weak link. He was a "super user"—the highest level of access at Autotote. In fact, he was responsible for maintaining the entire network.

He had DaSilva set up an account at the Catskill Off-Track Betting Corporation in Pomona, New York. Harn liked Catskill because its security was fairly lax. Unlike other OTB parlors, it didn't require the bettor to be physically present to open an account, and also didn't have a transaction history file. It was also a fairly low-traffic facility, making it easier to alter bets. He'd set up the system himself, so he knew how it could be exploited.

== The scheme ==
Harn had DaSilva conduct two dry runs of their scheme. On October 3, DaSilva bet on the Pick 4 harness races at Balmoral Park, about 45 miles from Arlington Park. After the first two races, Harn logged in and altered the original bets on the first two races, then picked every horse in the last two races. As a result, DaSilva netted $80,000 in winnings. Two days later, Harn and DaSilva repeated the pattern in a Pick 6 at Belmont Park. This time, DaSilva scored $100,000. For the Breeders' Cup, Harn had Davis open an account at Catskill in case the authorities got suspicious of DaSilva. Davis then called Catskill from his home in Baltimore to buy a $12 Pick 6 ticket, picking one winner in the first four races.

On Breeders' Cup Day, Harn slipped into his office at Autotote. To make sure he was covered, he remotely ejected the backup tape at Catskill before the first race. He then took several calls from Davis while the races were underway. After the fourth race, and half an hour before the Turf, Harn hacked onto the system and tracked down Davis' bet. He then changed Davis' original bet to reflect the actual four winners. After having the Catskill techs reinsert the tape, he bet on every horse running in the Turf and Classic, assuring that he would win. The plan worked, and they were able to turn their original $1,152 bet into almost $3.1 million in winnings--$2.57 million for winning the Pick 6, plus $498,000 in consolation prizes for picking five out of six winners.

== Suspicions mount ==
Unfortunately for Harn and his friends, the Classic was won by Volponi, a 43-to-1 longshot. Had a horse won with shorter odds, or if more money had been bet on Volponi, there would have been more winners—and a smaller payout—and Davis' bet would have looked normal. As it turned out, Davis held the only jackpot winner.

The nature of the bet raised suspicions as well. While most bettors pick more than one horse to increase their chances of winning, as mentioned above Davis selected only one horse for the first four races and effectively played the same ticket six times. It also seemed unusual that all the bets were placed through Catskill, a fairly small operation. The New York Racing Association asked the New York State Racing and Wagering Board to launch an investigation. As a first step, the board asked Arlington Park and Catskill not to pay out Davis' winnings. The New York State Police, FBI and the U.S. Attorney for the Southern District of New York later joined in the investigation.

Harn and Davis were very nervous, but finally decided their only course was to claim the bet was legitimate. Davis went to the press, maintaining his innocence. He said the only reason that the payout was so large was that he'd intended to make a $2 bet rather than the $12 bet he'd actually made. Davis demanded proof of any wrongdoing.

== Caught ==
The fact that the nature of the ticket changed so abruptly after the first four races (the same four winners picked for the first four races on every bet and then every possible combination of horses in the last two races) led investigators to wonder early on if someone had hacked into the system and changed the ticket. Naturally, the focus turned to the Autotote system. Autotote immediately suspected an inside job, and questioned all of its employees in Newark. They soon discovered that Harn wasn't scheduled to work on the day of the race, but had still been in the office. Even more seriously, they discovered Harn had tapped into the system and altered Davis' ticket after the first four races. When Harn couldn't explain his activity or what he was doing at work in the first place, Autotote fired him and turned over the results of its own investigation to New York State and federal officials.

Investigators soon discovered that Harn and Davis had been members of Drexel's Tau Kappa Epsilon chapter. Not long after that, they discovered DaSilva had been a member of that fraternity at the same time as Harn and Davis, and also had an account at Catskill. They soon discovered that DaSilva's bets at Balmoral and Belmont were similar in nature to the larger bet Davis made at the Breeders' Cup—raising suspicions that they were dry runs for the Breeders' Cup bet. The New York State Police also seized computers from Autotote and Harn's house, and also subpoenaed Harn's phone records. On November 12, Harn, Davis and DaSilva were each charged with one count of wire fraud in White Plains, New York. James Comey, the U.S. Attorney for Southern New York, portrayed the scheme as a 21st-century version of The Sting.

In the face of mounting evidence—including numerous calls from Davis' cell phone to Harn's Autotote phone and witnesses who saw Harn logged into the Catskill site while on the phone— Harn opted to cooperate with investigators. He not only admitted rigging the Breeders' Cup bet and the test runs he'd conducted with DaSilva, but also told investigators about his scheme to cash unpaid tickets—something they didn't know anything about. Federal law requires anyone cooperating with prosecutors to disclose all criminal activity in which they'd engaged.

On November 20—a week after the indictment—Harn pleaded guilty to conspiracy to commit wire and computer fraud and conspiracy to commit money laundering. He admitted to rigging the Breeders' Cup, Balmoral and Belmont bets. He also admitted to bilking legitimate winners out of $92,500 with his duplicate ticket scheme. On December 11, DaSilva pleaded guilty to similar charges, but claimed he didn't know Davis was in on the scheme and that he took no part in the Breeders' Cup bet. The next day, Davis pleaded guilty to conspiracy to commit wire fraud and gave up all claims to the money.

On March 20, 2003; Harn was sentenced to a year and a day in federal prison. Davis received 37 months while DaSilva received two years. The $3.1 million payoff was split among 78 people who'd gotten five out of six races right; each got $39,000 in addition to their original $4,600 consolation prizes.

== Fallout ==
Even though Autotote officials characterized the scheme as the actions of a "rogue software engineer", the National Thoroughbred Racing Association took swift action in the face of a growing outcry once the nature of the scam emerged. It required all tote companies to modify their software to transmit betting information immediately after the bet has closed. It also pressured its member tracks into not doing business with parlors that didn't have the ability to record wagers taken over the phone.

The scheme was profiled on the Canadian television series Masterminds.
