= Mikohn Gaming =

- Defunct: 2009
- Headquarters: Las Vegas, Nevada, United States
- Products: Slot machines

Mikohn Gaming was a company founded Las Vegas, Nevada, in 1986 to produce original slot machines and signage for casinos. Formed by John Acres and Mike Stone, the company's principal activity was to develop, manufacture and market branded slot machine and table games, gaming machines, gaming products including signage, progressive jackpot systems, and table game management systems. The company was restructured and renamed to Progressive Gaming International Corporation (PGIC) in 2005, and was publicly traded on NASDAQ with the trading symbol PGIC. At its peak, the company had about 300 employees and had offices in various other cities around the world. It went bankrupt in 2009.

== Products ==
Some of the slot machine game themes produced by Mikohn Gaming included several that were based on well-known brands, including:

- Several games produced by Hasbro:
  - Trivial Pursuit
  - Clue
  - Yahtzee
  - Battleship
- The rock band Kiss
- The comic strip Garfield

The Garfield game faced some criticism over the potential for it inappropriately appealing to children.

- Wink's Survey of America

== Timeline ==
- 1986: Mikohn is founded in Las Vegas, Nevada.
- 2005: Mikohn is restructured and renamed to Progressive Gaming International Corporation (PGIC), and was listed on NASDAQ with the trading symbol PGIC. Part of the restructuring included buying VirtGame, a company that made slot machines using a central server-based system architecture with downloadable content, for $20 million in stock swap value. At its peak, the company had about 300 employees and had offices in various other cities around the world.
- 2006: PGIC introduces Rapid Bet Live, a system for live real-time sports and race betting that supports betting on details within ongoing games, launching the system at The Palms Hotel and Casino, where it proves popular. The system receives the "Product of the Year Award for 2006" by Casino Journal and is extended to support wireless mobile betting devices.
- 2007 PGIC's Rapid Bet Live system is pulled out from The Palms without explanation.
- 2007: After failing to prevail in litigation against the game maker Derek Webb in which it had alleged patent rights violations by Webb's Three Card Poker game, PGIC agrees to pay a $20 million settlement for alleged anticompetitive behavior in attempting to enforce patent rights claims that were not valid.
- 2007: PGIC's Table Games Division, including the rights to all of PGIC's specialty table game titles, is sold to Shuffle Master for an upfront payment of $23.4 million and future payments, with an estimated net value between $37.4 million and $46.5 million.
- 2008: Having difficulty maintaining compliance with regulatory requirements for public trading amidst a general slowdown of the gaming industry during the Great Recession, PGIC conducts a 1-to-8 reverse stock split.
- 2009: PGIC files for Chapter 7 bankruptcy, listing assets of $263,600 and unsecured debts of $5.6 million. Most of the company's assets had been sold to International Game Technology (IGT) in a foreclosure sale just before the bankruptcy declaration. The company's largest unsecured creditor was Hasbro, to which it owed $1 million from a 2007 lawsuit settlement.
