= Michael Shackleford =

American mathematician

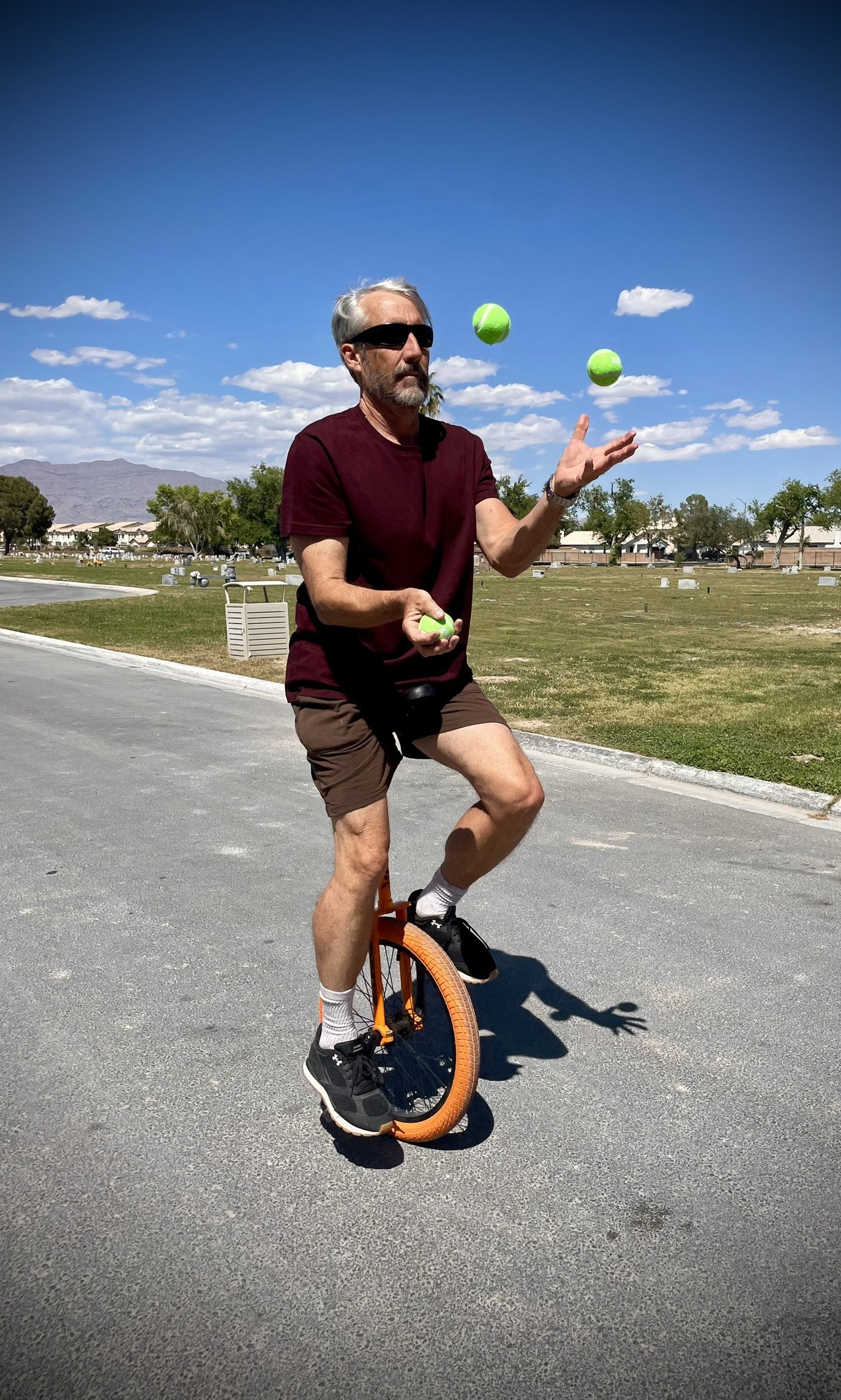
- Shackleford showing his talent juggling while riding a unicycle
- Born: May 23, 1965 (age 61); Pasadena, California, United States
- Other names: "Wizard of Odds", "Wizard of Vegas"
- Citizenship: American
- Known for: Work in Actuarial science, game studies, and gambling studies
- Scientific career
- Fields: Mathematics and actuary
- Institutions: University of Nevada, Las Vegas

Michael Shackleford (born May 23, 1965), also known as "The Wizard of Odds" (a title taken from Donald Angelini), is an American mathematician and an actuary.

Shackleford is best known for his professional analysis of the mathematics of the casino games, and for founding the websites The Wizard of Odds and The Wizard of Vegas, which contain analyses and strategies for casino games. He is also an adjunct professor of actuarial science and mathematics at the University of Nevada, Las Vegas.

== Early life ==
Shackleford discovered his affinity for mathematics when he began to study algebra in school at approximately 11 years old. He became interested in the mathematics of gambling at a young age after reading John Scarne's Guide to Casino Gambling.

== Career ==
=== Government employment ===
Before launching his websites, Shackleford worked as a claims adjuster and later as an actuary for the United States Social Security Administration from 1992 until 2000. His main responsibility there was estimating short-term costs and benefits of Social Security law changes, but he also did research on the most popular baby names for each year since 1880. The results of this research have been published in many books, newspapers, and magazines, and the Social Security Administration now officially publishes a new list every year of the previous year's most popular names, along with all the previous years' names.

=== Statistics and consulting ===
After consulting with his wife, Shackleford left his job as an actuary to work on his websites, The Wizard of Odds and The Wizard of Vegas. He later sold the websites on September 19, 2014 for $2.35 million to LCB Network.

In 2002, after moving to Las Vegas, he published a paper with rankings of slot machine payout percentages that were previously considered unavailable. The Time Out Las Vegas referred to the survey as "groundbreaking". This paper was referenced by Palms Casino Resort to advertise their competitive payouts.

Shackleford also analyzes new games for game developers and casinos. Clients include Hilton, Realtime Gaming, Playtech, and Shuffle Master. He is the author of Gambling 102: The Best Strategies for All Casino Games (Huntington Press, 2005). Previously, he was an adjunct professor of Casino Math at the University of Nevada, Las Vegas and a contributing editor to Casino Player magazine.

Shackleford is periodically consulted on gambling issues outside of Nevada. In 2010, Pittsburgh Live requested a consult on whether the gaming companies in Pennsylvania would tighten their blackjack rules.

Every year, professional gambler Max Rubin hosts the Blackjack Ball, an invitation-only event where a winner is given the title of "The Best Gambler in the World". To win this title, participants are quizzed with gambling trivia and mathematical questions. They also face a second series of tests where their skills are put to the test (card counting, signaling, etc.) The 2011 winner was Michael Shackleford, who beat Anthony Curtis to take the title.
