= WMS Gaming =

Manufacturer of gaming hardware and software

WMS Gaming is a manufacturer of slot machines, video lottery terminals and software to help casinos manage their gaming operations. It also offers online and mobile games. WMS was originally a subsidiary of WMS Industries, which became a wholly owned subsidiary of Scientific Games Corporation in 2013.

WMS entered the reel-spinning slot machine market in 1994, and in 1996, it introduced its first hit casino slot machine, Reel 'em In, a "multi-line, multi-coin secondary bonus" video slot machine. It followed this with a number of similar games like Jackpot Party, Boom and Filthy Rich. By 2001, it introduced its Monopoly-themed series of "participation" slots. Since then, WMS Gaming has continued to obtain licenses to manufacture gaming machines using several additional famous brands. The company continues to sell gaming machines and to market its participation games.

== History ==
WMS Gaming was founded as a subsidiary of WMS Industries, whose roots date back to the 1943 founding of Williams Manufacturing Company. Over the last decades of the 20th century, Williams produced popular pinball machines and video arcade games. By 1996, WMS had transferred its video game library to its video game subsidiary, Midway Games, which it took public and finally spun off in the late 1990s. With the rapid decline of the arcade industry in the 1990s, the company's pinball business became unprofitable, and WMS discontinued the pinball line in 2000.

Meanwhile, in 1991, WMS created a new division, Williams Gaming, to enter the gaming and state video lottery markets, developing and releasing its first video lottery terminals for the Oregon market in 1992. Williams Gaming entered the reel-spinning slot machine market in 1994, but the company's video gaming roots ultimately would prove to be its strength when, in 1996, it introduced its first hit casino slot machine, Reel 'em In, a "multi-line, multi-coin secondary bonus" video slot machine. WMS followed this with a number of similar successful games like Jackpot Party, Boom and Filthy Rich. During the 1990s, the gaming industry grew as additional states permitted casino gambling and video lottery games, and as Native American tribes built gaming casinos. The division was incorporated as WMS Gaming in 1999 and has since focused exclusively on the manufacture, sale, leasing, licensing and management of gaming machines.

In 2001, a glitch was uncovered in the company's software that allowed players to earn credits on some machines without paying for them. The industry leader IGT also sued WMS for patent infringement related to its reel-spinning games, winning a judgment that required WMS to limit the flexibility of its line of reel-spinning games. WMS Gaming's new video operating platform, CPU-NXT, debuted in 2003. It employed a faster, more open architecture that took advantage of the economies of scale enjoyed by Intel and other PC component vendors. The slot machine platform is based on the Linux operating system, initially ran on an Intel Pentium III processor and was the first to use flash memory rather than erasable programmable read only memory.

By 2001, WMS introduced its very successful Monopoly-themed series of "participation" slots, which the company licenses or leases to casinos, instead of selling the games to the casinos. The company's subsequent participation games have included machines based on well-known entertainment-related brands as Men in Black, Hollywood Squares, The Wizard of Oz, Star Trek, The Lord of the Rings and Clue. Some of these games are networked within casinos and even between multiple casinos so that players have a chance to win large jackpots based on the number of machines in the network. These branded games proved popular with players and profitable for WMS, as the net licensing revenues and lease fees generated by each game have exceeded the profit margins of its games for sale. The company's revenues grew to a high of $783.3million in 2011, but they decreased to $689.7million in 2012.

WMS Gaming's parent, WMS Industries, merged with Scientific Games in October 2013, becoming a wholly owned subsidiary of Scientific Games. Scientific Games paid $1.5 billion for WMS, and WMS shareholders received $26.00 per share. At the time of the merger, the company's stock ceased trading on the New York Stock Exchange.

== Products, technology, business ==
WMS Gaming's products have helped to move the industry trend away from generic mechanical slot machines and toward games that incorporate familiar intellectual properties and more creative ways to pay off. For more than a century beginning in the late 1800s, mechanical slot machine reels employed limited themes: card suits, horseshoes, bells and stars, varieties of fruit, black bars and the Liberty Bell. WMS's 1996 video slot machine Reel 'em In, introduced multi-line and multi-coin secondary bonus pay-outs. Later, the company's licensed themes, beginning with Monopoly, helped to greatly expand its sales and profits.

Some of WMS Gaming's product designs reflect the changing demographics of its industry. Younger players raised on video games often seek more challenging experiences, both physical and mental, than do women age 55 to 65 – the traditional audience for slot machines. Accordingly, some of the company's machines incorporate surround sound, flat-panel display screens and animated, full-color images.

The company also manufactures the G+ series of video reel slots, the Community Gaming family of interconnected slots, as well as mechanical reels, poker games, and video lottery terminals. WMS began to offer online gaming in 2010 to persons over 18 years old in the UK and in 2011 in the US at www.jackpotparty.com. In 2012, WMS partnered with Large Animal Games to incorporate several of WMS's slot machine games into a cruise ship-themed Facebook game application titled "Lucky Cruise". By playing games and enlisting Facebook friends' help, players can accumulate "lucky charms" (instead of money). The game play is similar to playing a slot machine but includes a "light strategy component".

In 2012, after experiencing a decline in revenues from the contracting casino market, the company introduced gaming on mobile devices and focused its efforts on expanding its online game offerings. For casinos, it introduced My Poker video poker games.

WMS Gaming technologies include:

- Transmissive Reels gaming platform, which employs video animation that is displayed around, over and seemingly interactively with mechanical reels. The technology is based on the CPU-NXT2 operating platform.
- Operating platforms. CPU-NXT2 operating platform, which incorporates an Intel Pentium IV class processor, up to 2 gigabytes of random-access memory, an ATI 3-D graphics chip-set, and a 40 gigabyte hard disk drive, is used in most of the games. The CPU-NXT3 operating platform was introduced in 2012 for participation games and new cabinets.
- Cabinets: The Bluebird2 gaming cabinet, which includes a dual 22-inch wide screen, high-definition displays, Bose speakers, and an illuminated printer and bill acceptor, was introduced in 2008. The Blade and Gamefield xD cabinets were introduced in 2013.

Approximately 70% of WMS's revenues are derived from U.S. customers. Its corporate office and manufacturing facilities are in Las Vegas, Nevada. It has other development, sales and field services offices across the United States and international development and distribution facilities located in Argentina, Australia, Austria, Canada, China, India, Mexico, the Netherlands, South Africa, Spain and the United Kingdom and an online gaming center in Belgium.
