= Bally Technologies =

American gambling technology company

Bally Technologies, Inc.
- Formerly: Advanced Patent Technology; Alliance Gaming
- Type: Division
- Traded as: NYSE: BYI
- Industry: Casino games Accounting systems
- Founded: 1968; 58 years ago
- Headquarters: Enterprise, Nevada, US
- Key people: Richard Haddrill (CEO); David Robbins (chairman)
- Products: Video slot machines Reel Slot machines Casino Management systems Deck Mate
- Revenue: ▲$997 million USD (2013)
- Total assets: ▲US$ 979.265 million (2013); ▲US$ 970.467 million (2012)
- Parent: Light & Wonder

Bally Technologies, Inc. is an American manufacturer of slot machines and other gambling technology based in Enterprise, Nevada. It is owned by Light & Wonder.

The company was founded in 1968 as Advanced Patent Technology. It eventually changed its name to Alliance Gaming and in 1996 acquired Bally Gaming International, a former division of Bally Manufacturing. In 2006, the entire company adopted the Bally name.

Scientific Games (now Light & Wonder) acquired the company in 2014. Today, Bally constitutes one of the three brands of Light & Wonder, along with WMS and Shuffle Master.

== History ==
=== Advanced Patent Technology ===
Advanced Patent Technology was founded in 1968 by Jack Solomon and Alvin Snaper, entrepreneurs who held patents in fields including medicine, optics, and electronics. The company's stock was publicly offered the next year. Its first 12 years were spent in the development stage. It boasted a portfolio of over 80 patents, but generated considerable publicity for five in particular: an ultrasonic fluidic fuel system for combustion engines, an ultrasonic endodontics device, a "louvered television screen", an ultrasonic meat tenderizer, and an ultrasonic dry cleaning machine.

=== Entry into gaming ===
Advanced Patent made its move into the gaming industry in 1979, acquiring United Coin Machine Company, one of the largest slot route operators in Nevada, and announcing plans for the Colorado Belle hotel and casino in Laughlin, the first of a series of hotels to be built in the Las Vegas area. An obstacle arose in July 1980 in the form of an SEC investigation, alleging inadequate financial disclosure and sale of unregistered stock. Under scrutiny from the Nevada Gaming Commission, Solomon was forced to step down as chairman, as a condition of licensing for the casino. Three new directors were added in November to the company's board as part of a settlement under discussion with the SEC, but by March 1981, regulators still had questions about the company's public disclosure, and trading in the stock was suspended for 10 days. The SEC investigation ended in 1983 with no further action against the company, while Solomon personally agreed to an injunction against any further securities violations, rather than fighting charges that he illegally sold stock in the company between 1975 and 1980 to raise money for its gaming ventures.

A management shake-up in the wake of the SEC probe saw C. Richard Iannone installed as president in 1981. According to Iannone, he was told the company "won't last six months", but he cut expenses and restructured debt, effecting a turnaround by 1983. The company changed its name to Gaming and Technology Inc. in March 1983 to better reflect its focus. The Colorado Belle, described as unprofitable, was sold the following year to Circus Circus Enterprises for $4 million.

=== Cal Omega takeover ===
On January 1, 1985, the company merged with Omega Enterprises, a manufacturer of video slot machines through its Cal Omega subsidiary, in a "reverse acquisition". Gaming & Technology acquired Omega's assets, and Omega's shareholders received 72.5% of the company's stock. One of Omega's owners, Alfred Wilms, was named CEO of the combined company.

By 1986, machine sales were in a slump, and slot route operations accounted for 80 percent of the firm's revenue, so the Cal Omega plant in Carlsbad, California was closed. The company changed its name again in 1988, to United Gaming Inc., acknowledging United Coin as its principal asset.

In 1989, United outlined a plan to become a major casino operator. It opened a $40 million line of credit to finance the construction of five mini-casinos. It partnered with the developer of the under-construction Chaparral Casino to build and operate the property's casino and dining facilities, and with another developer on the planned Double Eagle hotel and casino. It leased the casino at the Mizpah Hotel in Tonopah, Nevada, bought the Plantation Casino in Sparks, Nevada for $9.5 million, and opened two small casinos in Downtown Las Vegas, Miss Lucy's and the Trolley Stop. Wilms pumped more money into the company, investing $10 million in June 1990 to raise his ownership stake to 54 percent.

The company began restructuring its operations in summer 1990. It abandoned the Double Eagle project after its development partner ran into financing difficulty, and withdrew from the Chaparral project because of its own financing problems. By the winter, it was missing payments to its creditors, but a debt restructuring was achieved in September 1991. United closed Miss Lucy's Casino in February 1992.

In 1992, United Gaming expanded to Louisiana, where video poker had been legalized the year before. In August, it began operation of 600 machines at two race tracks, the New Orleans Fair Grounds and Jefferson Downs, and their eight off-track betting parlors. United also planned to install 1,000 machines at bars and truck stops in the state.

=== Kirkland-Fort Worth takeover ===
In 1993, United Gaming and Wilms reached an agreement with Kirkland-Fort Worth Investment Partners, a group affiliated with Texas investor Richard Rainwater, for a $5 million investment in exchange for 11 percent of the company. Wilms owned 62 percent of the company, but agreed to give up control to Kirkland, allowing them to name 4 of the 7 directors, in exchange for the investment. Concurrently, the company sold $85 million in convertible debentures. Rainwater outlined a plan to "become a really large factor" in the gaming industry, looking for bargain-price casinos "in every jurisdiction".

Rainwater's level of involvement in United became a matter of some dispute. After George W. Bush's ties to Rainwater, a fellow member of the group that owned the Texas Rangers baseball team, became a campaign issue in the 1994 race for governor because of Rainwater's involvement in gambling, Kirkland head Joel Kirschbaum described Rainwater's interest in the company as "passive". But a later lawsuit by Bally Gaming alleged that United admitted downplaying Rainwater's level of control because Major League Baseball frowned on team owners being involved in the gaming industry.

Within months of the Kirkland investment, United partnered in a bid for a gaming license in Evansville, Indiana, to build the River City Casino, was in discussions to acquire a stake in the under-development Diamond Jo Casino in Dubuque, Iowa, agreed to buy a 45 percent stake in the under-construction Rainbow Casino in Vicksburg, Mississippi, and agreed to invest $20 million for a 43 percent stake in Capital Gaming International, which was developing casinos with various Indian tribes and the Crescent City Queen casino in New Orleans.

The company came under scrutiny in November for its relationship with Antoine Saacks, Assistant Superintendent of the New Orleans Police Department, who had worked as a consultant for United's video poker operation in Louisiana. Saacks was suspended and later fired for violating a department policy against officers working for video poker companies, and for his connection to Frank Caracci, a nightclub owner tied to the New Orleans crime family. A week after the scandal broke, the company pulled out of its deal with Capital Gaming; United said the timing was coincidental, but a Capital Gaming insider said the situation could impact licensing of the New Orleans casino.

In March 1994, United bought 90 percent of USA Gaming of Native America, which had gaming development agreements with four Indian tribes. In June, United formed a joint venture with Casino Magic to build and operate a casino at Camptown Greyhound Racing in Frontenac, Kansas. In July, United agreed with Lone Star Casino Corp. to invest $15 million for a 50 percent stake in the Pine Hills Casino to be built in Bay St. Louis, Mississippi.

Some plans did not pan out. In August, the River City Casino group withdrew its bid after receiving low marks from a local evaluation panel. The company announced plans in September to wind down some of its smaller operations, closing the Trolley Stop in December 1995, ending the Mizpah Hotel lease in April 1996, and selling the taverns it had acquired in the course of slot route operations. In December, the company decided, after performing due diligence, not to make an offer for the Diamond Jo.

With Kirkland's backing in place, analysts expected the company to execute a major merger. United was cited as a possible suitor to buy Casino Magic, Caesars World, or Circus Circus.

In December 1994, United changed its name to Alliance Gaming Corporation, to reflect the company's "revitalization and redefinition".

=== Bally Gaming acquisition ===
Alliance began seeking ways to apply its marketing strength in the equipment business. Company executives felt there was a market opportunity in new riverboat and Indian casinos, where a slot maker could compete for "shelf space" without having to convince casino managers to switch from machines built by IGT, the market leader with a 70 percent share. CEO Steve Greathouse felt that machines could be made more fun, more interactive, and therefore more profitable, in contrast with IGT, whose executives believed that slot gamblers were "not playing to be entertained". Starting from scratch against such a dominant competitor was daunting though, so Alliance looked for an acquisition. The natural choice was Bally Gaming International, the number two player with a 15 to 20 percent share.

Kirschbaum had contacted Bally Entertainment about a merger as early as 1993, but Bally's CEO rebuffed him because of Alliance's heavy debt load and lack of earnings, suggesting they "develop their company a bit". Talks began again in October 1994, until Alliance broke them off in February 1995. Bally reached out to Alliance the next month through Rainwater, who discussed possibilities including a three-way merger with Autotote, a maker of lottery and pari-mutuel wagering technology.

In June 1995, with Bally already considering a buyout offer from WMS Industries, Alliance made an unsolicited offer of $210 million in cash, stock, and assumed debt. Days later, Bally's board of directors accepted WMS's offer of $120 million in stock, conditioned on Bally selling its German subsidiary, Bally Wulff, for at least $55 million. Bally called Alliance's offer "illusory and highly conditional" on financing, and said that WMS stock would give shareholders more long-term value than Alliance stock, and that a combination of Alliance and Bally would be so undercapitalized as to raise licensing concerns among gaming regulators.

Alliance undertook a hostile takeover effort, suing to block the WMS merger, announcing a tender offer of up to $55 million for 4.4 million shares of Bally, enough to give it a controlling interest, and seeking consent from Bally's shareholders to replace a majority of the board. Bally and WMS fired back with separate lawsuits seeking to block Alliance's tender offer. Alliance raised its offer to $70 million for 5.4 million shares, and WMS, in turn, raised its total bid to $142 million. In October, Alliance announced that it had been tendered 5.8 million shares, and alleged that Bally and WMS had reached an impasse over Bally's failure to find a buyer for Bally Wulff. The next day, Bally's board capitulated, canceling the deal with WMS and approving a merger with Alliance on terms similar to those of the tender offer, with a total value of $215 million.

After the two companies agreed to revise the deal down to $185 million to ensure the combined company would have enough cash to grow, and Alliance raised $166 million in financing, the acquisition was completed on June 18, 1996. Bally was organized as three divisions within Alliance Gaming: Bally Gaming, which made slot machines, Bally Systems, which made casino accounting and management systems, and Bally Wulff. Bally Gaming and Systems were combined into a single unit in 1998.

In 1999, Bally launched Thrillions, a wide-area progressive jackpot system, as part of a strategy to focus on games to be installed on a revenue-participation bonus instead of being sold outright to casinos. The game initially launched with a Betty Boop theme, and later added variants based on Blondie and Popeye.

This period also saw the introduction of the EVO VIDEO game platform and the EVO 3, which was created in partnership with Microsoft.

The company began seeking buyers for its slot route and casino operations in late 1999, to narrow its focus on gaming technology. After six months, no acceptable bids were received for the Rail City and Rainbow casinos. An agreement was reached to sell United Coin to a pair of Iowa riverboat casino operators for $118 million, but Alliance backed out of the sale a year later because of increased profits at the subsidiary.

=== The 2000s ===
Bally took the publicly traded company from the brink of NASDAQ delisting in 2000 to record revenues and profits just two years later. On December 12, 2002, Alliance Gaming moved from NASDAQ to the New York Stock Exchange, trading under the ticker symbol “AGI”.

The effort to divest non-core assets resumed in July 2003, with agreements to sell United Coin for $127 million to Century Gaming, the largest slot route operator in Montana, Bally Wulff for $16.5 million to German company Orlando Management, and Alliance's 49 percent share in the Louisiana video poker operation to New Orleans–based Gentilly Gaming. In December, Alliance agreed to sell the Rail City casino to Sands Regent for $38 million.

Meanwhile, Alliance considered acquiring Multimedia Games, a leading maker of Class II machines for Indian casinos and bingo halls, but the asking price was too high. Instead, the company in 2004 acquired Sierra Design Group for $165 million, giving it a strong entry into the markets for Class II machines, video lottery terminals, and centrally linked progressive machines for Washington state.

Determining that its Evo platform lacked the horsepower to produce satisfying video games, Bally re-engineered its entire line of video and reel-spinning slot machines. Alpha, its new platform based on Sierra's operating system, dramatically improved Bally's entire portfolio of games, leading to the release of Hot Shot Progressives, a new series of video and reel machines. Overtaking the Blazing 7s line, Hot Shot Progressives quickly became the company's biggest seller and the most successful product launch in the company's history. Bally also introduced several new gaming platforms, including the V20 upright, the dual-screen V20/20 video slot, the S9E reel-spinner and the CineVision wide-screen video gaming device. As of July 2009, more than 550 casinos worldwide utilize Bally systems products running on more than 400,000 slot machines.

In 2006, Alliance changed its name to Bally Technologies, Inc., discontinuing the use of Bally Gaming and Systems as a subsidiary, to present a unified identity.

In 2007, Bally Technologies celebrated the 75th anniversary of the Bally trademark with a series of special customer events in Atlantic City, Las Vegas, and Chicago. Also, the company commissioned Christian Marfels, author of the book Bally - The World's Game Maker to write an updated second edition, a copy of which was given to every Bally employee.

In 2008, Bally acquired CoolSign, a multi-media management tool, from Planar. On the games side, in 2008 and 2009, Bally released a number of new gaming products, including its new Digital Tower Series, whose games feature dynamic, interactive and animated top-box displays. Additionally, in 2009 the company released its new "Jumbo" cabinets, which measure nearly eight feet high by over three feet wide. In late 2009, Bally displayed their new Pro Series V22/22 upright and Pro Series Slant Top slot featuring a 22" game display and a 26" top display. Bally engineered reduced power consumption in these new platforms. Bally also developed Ultimate Texas Hold'em in 2009.

In 2010, Bally sold the Rainbow Casino to Isle of Capri Casinos for $80 million.

On November 25, 2013, Bally acquired SHFL entertainment, a global gaming supplier operating in five primary categories: Utility products (including Deck Mate card shufflers and roulette chip sorters), proprietary table games, electronic table systems, electronic gaming machines (including video slot machines) and iGaming.

In 2014, Bally won four awards in the 'Slot Floor Technology Awards' as well as earning two spots in the annual ‘Top 20 Most Innovative Gaming Technology Products' awards.

In August 2014, Bally agreed to be acquired by Scientific Games (now Light & Wonder), maker of lottery and sports betting equipment, for $3.3 billion plus $1.8 billion in assumed debt. The acquisition was completed on November 21, 2014. Today, Bally constitutes one of the core brands of Light & Wonder.

== Today ==
Bally Technologies is focused on the casino gaming industry, specifically slot machines. Acquisitions of such companies as Casino Marketplace, MindPlay and Advanced Casino Systems Corporation (ACSC) enabled Bally to grow. The company’s past acquisitions include the now-defunct firm Honeyframe Cashmaster of Telford, England, and Micro Clever Consulting (MCC) of Nice, France. Those two firms made casino-management software.
