= Let It Ride (card game) =

Card game based on poker

Let It Ride logo

Let It Ride is a casino table game based on poker, where the player wagers on a five-card poker hand formed by their own three cards and two community cards. It is a product of Bally Technologies, under its Shuffle Master brand.

== History ==
The game was invented by Shuffle Master founder John Breeding, with the goal of fueling demand for the company's shuffling machine.

Initially popular in many casinos, the popularity of the game has waned since then because of its relatively high house edge. Like blackjack and video poker, player decisions in Let It Ride affect the house edge. With the standard pay table and optimal strategy, the house edge is 3.51%, several times that of blackjack and craps.

== Basic rules ==
Let It Ride is a variation of five-card stud, based on three player cards and two community cards. The two community cards are initially dealt face down. The most distinguishing feature of Let It Ride is that the player is given two opportunities to withdraw exactly one-third of their initial wager. One chance occurs after the player looks at their hand but before the first community card is revealed, and the second occurs after the first community card is revealed, but before the second is revealed. The player may reduce their wager on either of these occasions, or on both, or neither. If the player decides not to withdraw part of their wager, they are said to "let it ride." In order to ensure that the player's initial wager is divisible by three, each player must distribute their wager over three betting spots which must all contain the same chip value. On some table layouts these spots are given the symbols 1, 2 and $, with 1 and 2 indicating the thirds of the wager which the player can withdraw before the first and second community cards respectively are turned up, and $ representing the third of the wager which there is never a chance to withdraw.

After players have placed their bets, the dealer starts from their left, and deals each player one card, followed by the first face-down community card, followed by a further card to each player, followed by the second community card, followed by a final card to each player. Players are not permitted to show their cards or to see the cards of other players at any point before the end of the deal.

In the event of a winning hand after the second community card is revealed, what remains of the player's wager is paid out according to a payout table such as the one given below. There are small variations in payoffs between casinos, but the lowest paying hand in Let It Ride is typically a pair of 10s; a pair of nines or less is a losing hand, which results in the player forfeiting their remaining wager to the house.

=== Payouts ===
Payout schedule
| Hand | Payout |
|---|---|
| Royal flush | 1,000 to 1 |
| Straight flush | 200 to 1 |
| Four of a kind | 50 to 1 |
| Full house | 11 to 1 |
| Flush | 8 to 1 |
| Straight | 5 to 1 |
| Three of a kind | 3 to 1 |
| Two pair | 2 to 1 |
| Pair of 10s or better | 1 to 1 |

== Three Card Bonus ==
The Three Card Bonus is an optional side bet offered at some tables. The bet is placed on the player's three cards only. Winnings from a fixed payout table are awarded based on the three-card hand, following the hand rankings of three-card brag. This is comparable to the "Pair Plus" side bet in the casino game of Three Card Poker.
