= SHFL Entertainment =

Nevadan gambling company

SHFL entertainment, Inc.
- Formerly: Shuffle Master
- Industry: Gaming
- Founded: 1983; 43 years ago in Minneapolis
- Founder: John Breeding
- Defunct: November 25, 2013
- Fate: Acquired by Bally Technologies
- Headquarters: Paradise, Nevada, U.S.
- Products: Deck Mate

SHFL entertainment, Inc. (previously named Shuffle Master) was a manufacturer of shuffling machines, table games, slot machines, and other casino products, based in Paradise, Nevada. Founded in 1983, it was acquired by Bally Technologies in 2013. Bally was itself acquired the following year by Scientific Games, now Light & Wonder, which continues to use the Shuffle Master name as one of its core brands.

The company designed Deck Mate, one of the primary card shuffling devices used in casinos. The company's table game products included Let It Ride, Three Card Poker, Blackjack Switch, and Casino War.

== History ==
Shuffle Master was formed by John Breeding, a former truck driver, in 1983. Inspired by a newspaper article about card counting in blackjack, he borrowed $30,000 to develop a mechanical shuffler that would allow every hand to be dealt from a fresh deck, nullifying the advantage of card counting, without losing valuable playing time. The device finally came to market in early 1992, and the company made its initial public offering later that year.

Casinos were increasingly using multiple decks for blackjack, limiting the sales potential of Breeding's single-deck shuffler. To fuel demand for the shufflers, he developed a new single-deck game, Let It Ride. By 1995, Let It Ride was generating more revenue for Shuffle Master than its namesake device.

In 1998, the company's headquarters moved from Minneapolis to the Las Vegas area. The firm expanded into the slot machine business in the late 1990s, developing games based on licensed properties like The Honeymooners, Press Your Luck and Let's Make a Deal and partnering with larger companies like IGT and Bally to manufacture and distribute them. The slots business failed to turn a profit, and Shuffle Master sold it to IGT in 2004 for $1.6 million.

In February 2004, Shuffle Master bought most of the assets of BET Technology, a developer of table games including Casino War and Fortune Pai Gow.

In 2006, the company returned to the slot machine field, buying Australian manufacturer Stargames Limited for $108 million. Among Stargames's products was Rapid Roulette, a roulette variant in which a dealer spins a physical roulette wheel, but wagers are placed and paid out on touchscreen terminals, increasing the pace of play.

Gavin Isaacs, a former Bally executive, was named CEO in March 2011. In March 2012, Shuffle Master agreed to buy Ongame Network, a provider of services to online poker sites, from bwin.party Services for $26 to 39 million, but it pulled out of the deal months later due to declining market conditions in Europe and uncertainty about the legalization of online poker in the US.

In October 2012, the company changed its name to SHFL Entertainment, to reflect the diversity of its product offerings.

In 2012 SHFL obtained the license to distribute Geoff Hall's blackjack variant, Free Bet Blackjack, worldwide excluding the UK and Nevada. At the Global Gaming Expo conference in October 2012, SHFL debuted Mulligan Poker, a game developed by Michael Shackleford and currently only offered online by casinos using IGT software. The game was set to be released in physical casinos in Kansas early in 2013.

In July 2013, Bally Technologies agreed to acquire SHFL for about $1.3 billion. The acquisition was completed on November 25, 2013.

== Market position ==
SHFL had a "virtual monopoly" in the card shuffler business.

Forbes named the firm as one of the 200 Best Small Companies in America for at least five years in a row.
