= Casino War =

Casino table game

Casino War is a proprietary casino table game based on the game of War. It is distributed by Shuffle Master, a division of Scientific Games.

== Game play ==
The game is normally played with six standard 52 card decks. The cards are ranked in the same way that cards in poker games are ranked, with aces being the highest cards.

One card each is dealt to a dealer and to a player. If the player's card is higher, they win the wager they bet. However, if the dealer's card is higher, the player loses their bet.

A tie occurs when the dealer and the player each have cards of the same rank. In a tie situation, the player has two options:

- The player can surrender, in which case the player loses half the bet.
- The player can go to war, in which case the player must double their stake.

If the player continues play in view of a tie, the dealer burns (discards) three cards before dealing each of them an additional card. If the player's card is ranked higher than the dealer's, then the player wins the amount of their original wager only. If the dealer's card is ranked higher than the player's, the player loses their (doubled) wager. If the ranks are equal, then the player wins the amount of their doubled wager.

A side bet is offered by which a player can bet on ties. If the player bets on the tie, and their card matches the dealer's, then the player wins 10 to 1 to their original wager on the tie bet.

== Strategy and house advantage ==
Surrendering has a slightly higher advantage for the house in the case that a bonus payout is offered, so based on the expected value probabilities a player should never surrender.

The dealer and the player each have a 46.3% chance of winning on the first card (in a standard game with 6 decks), so this seems like an even money game. The house advantage, however, comes from what happens in the case of a tie.

The house advantage increases with the number of decks in play and decreases in casinos who offer a bonus payout. The house advantage for this game is usually over 2%.

== History ==
The game was developed by Bet Technology, a small company based in Carson City, Nevada. The patent on the game was filed in 1993. By 1994, the game was offered at five Northern Nevada casinos, beginning with Harrah's Tahoe.

In 2004, Shuffle Master acquired most of Bet Technology's assets, including Casino War.
