= Ultimate Texas Hold'em =

Trademarked poker variant

Ultimate Texas Hold'Em
- Type: Community card poker
- Players: 2+, usually 2–9
- Skills: Probability, psychology, game theory, strategy
- Cards: 52
- Deck: French
- Rank (high→low): A K Q J 10 9 8 7 6 5 4 3 2
- Play: Clockwise
- Chance: Medium

Ultimate Texas Hold 'Em (also known as Ultimate Texas holdem and Ultimate Texas Hold'em) is a registered trademark of Bally Gaming, Inc. and refers to a reinvented variant of the classic poker game Texas hold 'em. In this variation, the player does not compete against other players. Instead, they play only against the dealer. At any point during the course of the hand, the player is free to make one raise. In this poker-based game (community cards), the earlier the raise is made, the higher its value is.

The game begins with the player making a blind bet and an ante. They are also provided with an optional Trips side which allows them to acquire a payout whether their hand loses or wins. Ultimate Texas Hold 'em is different from other poker-based games in the sense that the ante still remains in play even after the players made a raise and even if the dealer does not open.

== Objective ==
The format of Ultimate Texas Hold ‘Em is similar to other variants of poker available in most casinos and online poker sites. The objective is to outrank the dealer's hand by making the best five-card poker hand from two hole cards and five community cards.

The dealer and each player are dealt two hole cards. The player looks at their cards and decides if they wish to check or raise 3x or 4x their Ante bet. If the player decides to raise ("Play" bet) at any point during the hand, the player action ends for that hand.

After the player decides to check or raise, the dealer reveals three of the five community cards which are referred to as the “flop”. A player who did not raise before the flop has a choice to check again or raise 2x their Ante bet.

After the player decides to check or raise, the last two community cards are revealed. At this point, the player who has not raised is required to match their Ante 1x or fold. After this, the dealer reveals their two hole cards and grades the hand. In order for the dealer to qualify, they must possess at least a pair. If they fail to qualify, the Ante bet pushes before the hands are assessed.

The dealer compares their hand to the player hand. If the dealer qualifies and the player beats the dealer, both the Ante and Play bets pay 1-to-1. The Blind bet pays on a straight or better. If the dealer beats the player, Ante, Play, and Blind bets lose. Ties push the Ante, Raise, and Blind bets.

== History ==
Ultimate Texas Hold ‘Em was developed by Roger Snow of Bally Gaming, Inc. (formerly Shuffle Master). It is one of the newest variations of the poker game and is currently widely popular among US casinos. It is one of the most in-demand niche table games in casinos in Las Vegas and many other states.

Initially, Ultimate Texas Hold ‘Em was only available on multi-player electronic machines. However, through the years, its popularity increased and some casinos decided to pick it up and expand it, turning it into a table game.

== Rules ==
Like the common poker game formats, Ultimate Texas Hold ‘Em is played with a single, regular 52-card deck. Towards the end of the game, the dealer and the players left use any combination from their own two cards and the five community cards in order to come up with the best possible hand for themselves. The dealer will only be able to open if they possess at least a paired board. The play, ante, and blind bets are graded, depending on who wins, and whether the dealer will open. The table below illustrates the scoring guidelines.

Winner	Dealer Opens	Play	Ante	Blinds
Player	Yes	Win	Win	Win
Player	No	Win	Push	Win
Dealer	Yes	Lose	Lose	Lose
Dealer	No	Lose	Push	Lose
Tie	Yes or No	Push	Push	Push

Winning play and ante bets are rewarded 1 to 1. Look at the table below to learn how winning blind bets are paid out.

Player hand	Payout
Royal Flush	500 to 1
Straight Flush	50 to 1
Four of a Kind	10 to 1
Full House	3 to 1
Flush	3 to 2
Straight	1 to 1
All other	Push

On the other hand, the payout for trips bets depends on the value of the player’s hand – regardless of the value of the hand possessed by the dealer.
