= Three Card Poker =

Casino game

- Designers: Derek Webb
- Years active: 1994
- Genres: Casino game

Three Card Poker is a casino table game based on poker. It was designed in 1994 by Derek Webb.

== History ==
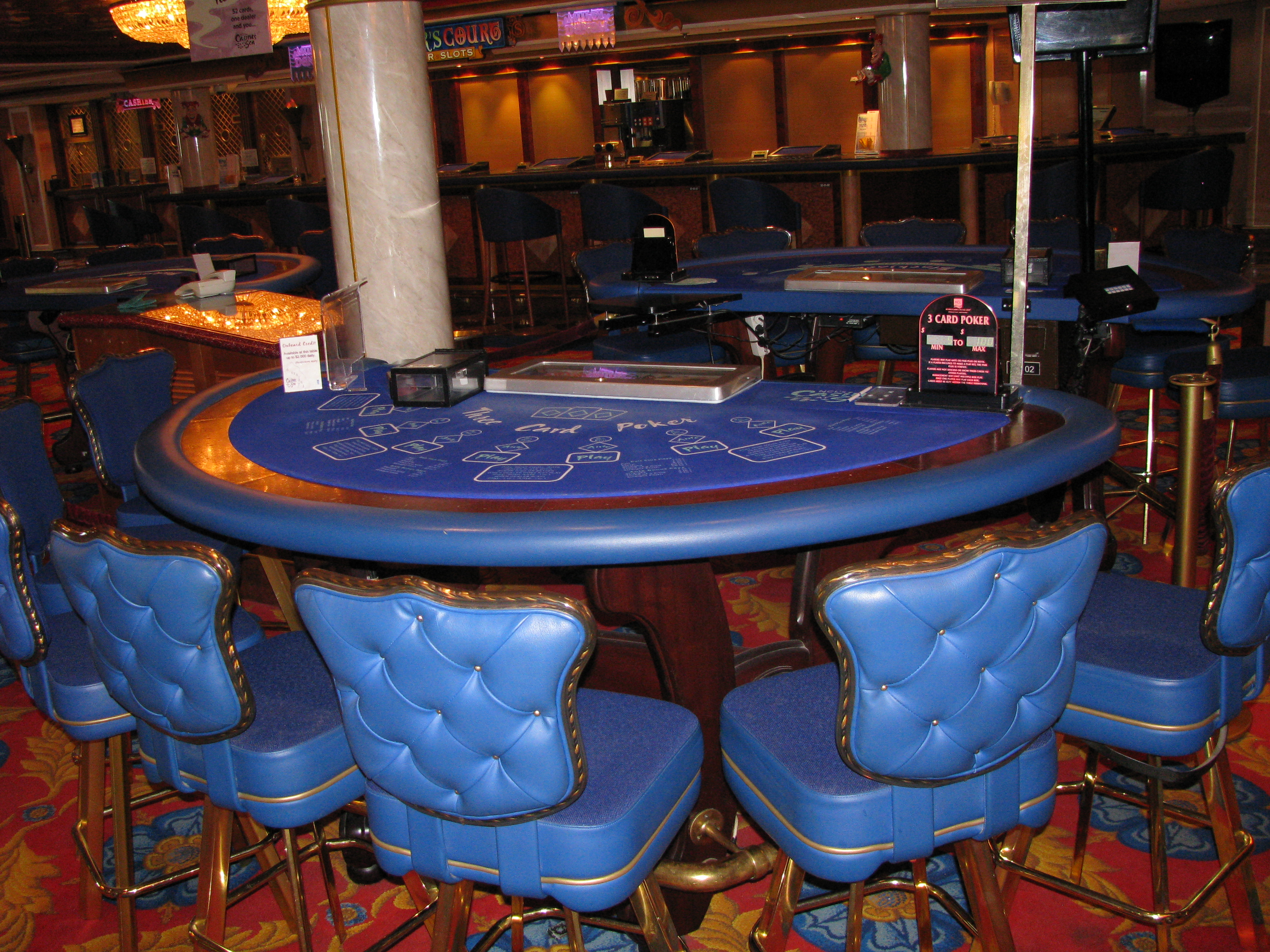
A Three Card Poker table in a casino aboard the Norwegian Dawn cruise ship

The casino variant of Three Card Poker was first created by Derek Webb in 1994 and patented in 1997. Webb's goal was to create a version of poker that played with the speed of other table games. It was important to Webb that he got the correct mix of three important factors for any casino game: the game rules were easy to understand, the payouts were large enough to attract players, and the house edge was enough that casino owners would be interested in adopting the game.

Webb established a business called Prime Table Games to market the game in both the United States and United Kingdom. The British Casino Association, now known as the National Casino Industry Forum (NCiF) suggested that Webb gain some experience in the US first, since the UK had regulations against such a table game and his application was not strong enough to convince regulators to make significant changes to their rules and regulations for a new game.

The first to adopt the game was Barry Morris, Vice President of Grand Casino Gulfport in Mississippi, after Webb had unsuccessful sales pitches with casino owners in Reno, Las Vegas, and Atlantic City. A key aspect of Webb's offer to Morris was to stand on the floor to train the dealers himself, as well as watch to make sure the game was being played correctly. United Kingdom gambling regulations were changed to allow the introduction of Three Card Poker in 2002.

Prime Table Games continued marketing Three Card Poker until 1999, when Shuffle Master acquired the rights to the game outside the British Isles. The sale was prompted by a lawsuit filed that year in US federal court by Mikohn Gaming, the then-owners of Caribbean stud poker, alleging patent infringement; Shuffle Master agreed to defend that litigation as part of the purchase. Subsequently, in 2007, Prime Table Games showed in a countersuit that the 1999 litigation was based on invalid patent claims; Mikohn (which had since been renamed as Progressive Gaming International Corporation – PGIC) settled the suit by paying $20 million. Further, Prime Table Games filed suit against Shuffle Master in 2008 alleging in part that Shuffle Master had undisclosed knowledge that the PGIC claims were invalid prior to the 1999 purchase; that lawsuit was later settled for over $2 million.

Shuffle Master, later renamed SHFL entertainment, was acquired by Bally Technologies in November 2013. Bally was acquired by Scientific Games in November 2014. Scientific Games was renamed Light & Wonder in April 2022. In 2023, the Washington State Gambling Commission approved updated rules for Three Card Poker submitted by Light & Wonder.

== Rules ==
Three Card Poker is played as heads-up between the player's hand and the dealer's hand. After all ante wagers are placed, three cards are dealt to each player and the dealer. Players have a choice to either fold or continue in the game by placing a "play" wager equal to their ante. Hands are then exposed and wagers resolved.

The dealer's hand must be Queen high or better for the dealer hand to play. If the dealer does not play, then there is no action on play wagers and ante wagers are paid 1 to 1. If the dealer does play, the dealer and player hands are compared. If the player hand loses, both the ante and play wagers are lost. If the player hand wins, both the ante and play wagers are paid 1 to 1. If the hands are tied, then there is no action on either wager.

Additional optional bets are offered. The Pair Plus wager is a bet that the player's hand will be a pair or better. The Pair Plus wager wins if the player has at least a pair of twos. The payoff applies regardless of the dealer's hand, as the Pair Plus wager is not in competition against the dealer's hand. Some casinos also offer an Ante Bonus, which is paid on the ante wager for a straight or better. The typical Ante Bonus paytable pays 5 to 1 for a straight flush, 4 to 1 for a three of a kind, and 1 to 1 for a straight. Like the Pair Plus wager, the Ante Bonus pays regardless of whether that hand beats the dealer's hand.

=== Hand ranks ===
Straight flush

Three of a kind

Straight

Flush

Pair

High card

Examples of poker hand categories in descending order

Hand Ranks of Three Card Poker
Rank	Description	Frequency	Probability
Straight flush	Three suited cards in sequence	48	0.22%
Three of a kind	Three cards of same rank	52	0.24%
Straight	Three cards in sequence	720	3.26%
Flush	Three suited cards	1,096	4.96%
Pair	Two cards of same rank	3,744	16.94%
High card	None of the above	16,440	74.39%
Total hands	-	22,100	-

Probability of Queen high or better is 69.59%

These probabilities give three card poker a house edge of about 3.37% on the ante bet, depending on the rules and payouts of a particular game.

== Variations ==
Some venues have added a wager called Prime in United Kingdom casinos and the game is known as Prime Three Card Poker. The Prime wager is optionally placed before cards are dealt and pays on the color of the player's cards. If all three cards are the same color the payoff is 3 to 1. However, when the dealer's cards are included if all six cards are the same color then the payoff is increased to 4 to 1.

Another variation is "six card bonus", in which the players are given a payout based on the best five-card poker hand that can be made using any combination of the player's three cards and the dealer's three cards. The payoff ranges from 5 to 1 for three of a kind to 1000 to 1 for a royal flush. Payoffs are paid regardless of whether any other bets pay.

== See also ==
- Teen Patti
- Three card brag
- Four card poker
- Kuhn poker
