= Light & Wonder =

American electronic gaming and gambling company

Light & Wonder, Inc.
- Formerly: Scientific Games Corporation
- Type: Public
- Traded as: ASX: LNW
- ISIN: US80874P1093
- Industry: Gambling
- Predecessor: Autotote Corporation
- Founded: 1973; 53 years ago
- Headquarters: Enterprise, Nevada
- Key people: Matt Wilson (CEO, president); Jamie Odell (chairman)
- Brands: Bally; WMS; Shuffle Master
- Revenue: US$3.2 billion (2024)
- Operating income: US$762 million (2024)
- Net income: US$399 million (2024)
- Total assets: US$5.421 billion (2024)
- Number of employees: 6,800 (2024-2025)
- Website: lnw.com

Light & Wonder, Inc., formerly Scientific Games Corporation (SG), is an American corporation that provides gambling products and services. The company is headquartered in Enterprise, Nevada, with a Las Vegas mailing address.

Light & Wonder's gaming division provides products such as slot machines, table games, shuffling machines, and casino management systems. Its brands include Bally, WMS, and Shuffle Master.

== History ==
The company traces its history to Autotote, a manufacturer of totalizator systems for parimutuel wagering at racetracks. The history of Autotote dates to 1917, when George Julius founded Automatic Totalisators Limited in Australia to build the totalizator system he had invented.

Automatic Totalisators opened its U.S. office in New York City in 1953, and then moved it to Wilmington, Delaware in 1956. It moved again to Newark, Delaware in 1972. In 1978, the U.S. division was renamed as Autotote Ltd., to reflect its diversification into businesses other than totalizators, such as lottery systems, off-track betting, and slot machine accounting.

In 1979, Autotote Ltd. was acquired for $17 million by a group led by Thomas H. Lee Co.

In 1989, United Tote, another leading totalizator company, purchased Autotote for $85 million. Before the companies' operations could be integrated, the merger was challenged by federal antitrust regulators. A 1991 court ruling forced the company to split back up. The former United Tote assets were sold back to that company's founders, the Shelhamer family, and what remained of the company was renamed as Autotote Corporation, now a publicly traded company.

In 2000, Autotote bought Scientific Games Holdings Corp., a maker of instant lottery equipment, for $308 million. Scientific Games was founded in 1973, and introduced the first secure instant lottery ticket in 1974. The combined company changed its name from Autotote to Scientific Games Corporation in 2001.

By 2002, two-thirds of the $20 billion wagered annually on racing in North America was tracked by Autotote computers. Autotote supplied parimutuel wagering systems worldwide. These were automated, computerized off-track and on-track systems for betting on horse races and greyhound racing. It was an integrated system for off-track betting, keeping track of race results and winning tickets, and race simulcasting. The security of Autotote software for the racing industry garnered media attention in 2002 when one of their software developers, Chris Harn, attempted to steal $3 million during the 2002 Breeders' Cup betting scandal through a hole in their software and processes described as "an example of a very simple exploitation of a rather stupid design flaw."

The National Thoroughbred Racing Association took swift action in the face of a growing outcry once the nature of the scam emerged. It required all tote companies to modify their software to transmit betting information immediately after the bet has closed. It also pressured its member tracks into not doing business with parlors that did not have the ability to record wagers taken over the phone.

In 2007, the New York Times credited Scientific Games and Gtech for transforming what was known "historically [as] an underground operation run by mobsters" into "a lucrative, state-sponsored corporate enterprise." Autotote's racing division, the core of the original Autotote, was sold to Sportech in 2010.

Scientific Games moved its headquarters to the unincorporated Las Vegas area community of Enterprise, Nevada, in 2015. After acquiring Bally Technologies, the headquarters were moved there and the previous offices were sold to UFC, which converted it into the UFC Apex.

In March 2017, Scientific Games acquired rights to use the James Bond franchise through a deal with Eon Productions and MGM Interactive.

SG launched its social gaming division, SciPlay, as a publicly traded company in 2019, selling a minority share in the business through an initial public offering.

In 2020, SG began a strategic review with the aim of deleveraging its balance sheet, as it struggled under $9.2 billion of debt. The company ultimately decided to sell its lottery and sports betting businesses, to focus on its casino gambling business. In 2021, SG agreed to sell its sports betting division to Endeavor Group Holdings for $1.2 billion, and to sell its lottery division (the core of the original Scientific Games) to Brookfield Business Partners for $6.1 billion. As the divested lottery business took the Scientific Games name, the company announced in March 2022 that it would rebrand as Light & Wonder.

In May 2022, Light & Wonder listed on the Australian Securities Exchange.

In November 2025, Light & Wonder delisted from the Nasdaq.

== Subsidiaries ==
Wholly owned subsidiaries of Light & Wonder include The Global Draw, Barcrest, Bally Technologies, WMS Industries, MDI Entertainment, LLC, NYX Gaming Group Limited and SciPlay.

In 2006, the company acquired the lottery operations of the Swedish firm EssNet, as well as The Global Draw which provides server-based gambling machines to betting shops in the UK. Another UK-based gambling company Barcrest was acquired from IGT in 2010. Barcrest is the owner of Deal Games and a producer of betting and gambling terminals.

In October 2013, the company bought WMS Industries, the third largest manufacturer of slot machines, for $1.5 billion. Scientific Games later acquired another slot machine maker, Bally Technologies, in November 2014, for $3.3 billion plus $1.8 billion in assumed debt.

In 2016, the company acquired DEQ Systems, a Canadian table-game maker. The mobile bingo app maker Spicerack Media Inc. was acquired in April 2017 to expand the Scientific Games social gaming division. Scientific Games also announced the $631 million acquisition of NYX Gaming Group Limited in September 2017. When NYX acquisition was completed, the company gained the sports-betting platform OpenBet which handles about 80% of all sports betting in the UK as of 2018. In November 2021, SG acquired Authentic Gaming, a provider of live streaming casino games.

In May 2022, after previously reaching an exclusive distribution agreement with the company in Europe and North America, Light and Wonder acquired Playzido.

In 2023, the company acquired the remaining 17% equity interest in its social gaming division SciPlay, making it a wholly owned subsidiary. Bloomberg reported in 2022 that Engine Capital sought this merger.

In February 2025, the company acquired Grover Gaming, a charitable gambling business, which operates in five states allowing charitable organizations to benefit from the sale of pull tabs.
