= Malaysian Pontoon =

Malaysian variant of the pontoon card game

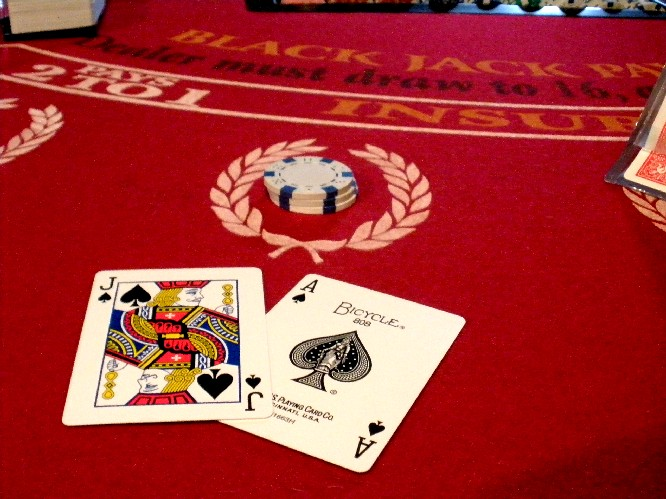
Pontoon, a hand consisting of an ace and a card worth 10 points

Malaysian Pontoon is a card game related to Pontoon and blackjack and, like those games, a descendant of Vingt-Un or Twenty-One. It is played by those in Australia, Malaysia and Singapore, where it is usually just called pontoon. This game is similar to match play 21 or Spanish 21, while original pontoon, played in Britain, holds closer to the traditional Twenty-One rules, but can be quickly distinguished by the use of the terms "twist" and "stick".

The Malaysian version of pontoon is played in Australian, Malaysian, British, and Singaporean casinos using multiple customized decks of cards. In the Treasury Casino, Brisbane, it is known as Treasury 21. In Jupiters Casino, Gold Coast, it is known as Jupiters 21, in the Reef Casino, Cairns, it is known as Paradise Pontoon, and in Tasmania, it is known as Federal Pontoon.

The British variant of Twenty-One called pontoon is played in the UK and Commonwealth with single 52-card decks. British pontoon uses the terms "twist" (hit), "stick" (stand) and "buy" (double the bet, not to be confused with doubling down) and a different set of rules. The rules for buying in pontoon include allowing the player to buy on any hand of 2 to 4 cards, allowing the player to twist after he buys.

== History ==
Pontoon is the British or domestic version of Twenty-One which was originally Vingt-Un (French for twenty-one), a French gambling game popular at the court of Louis XV and later, much favoured by Napoleon, especially at St. Helena. In the twentieth century it became the most popular game of the armed forces of English-speaking nations. Pontoon, unlike casino Blackjack, has no official rules and varies widely from school to school. Its name may be a corruption of the name of the similar French game.

== Object ==
The Australasian version of pontoon is an arithmetical game played on a table with the same layout as blackjack. In each deal, the player's aim is to receive cards totalling more in face value than the banker's, but not exceeding 21, otherwise he/she is "bust" and loses. A 21 consisting of an ace and a card worth 10 is a pontoon, and pays extra. A player's 21 or pontoon always beats a dealer 21 or pontoon. Like Spanish 21, it is played from either a shoe or a 4-deck continuous shuffling machine (CSM). The shoe games use six or eight Spanish decks, which are regular 52-card decks, minus the ten-spot cards. Cards Two to Nine count 2 to 9 respectively, courts 10 each, Aces 1 or 11, depending on what is better for the hand.

== Rules ==
Pontoon has similar rules to Spanish 21, with some notable differences, listed below.

1. Just like in Australian, Asian, and European blackjack, the dealer has no hole card (NHC). This means that the players do not know whether or not the dealer has a natural (a.k.a. blackjack, an ace and a 10-valued card) until the end of the round, when the dealer draws his second card. Therefore, it is possible to draw to "21" and win against a dealer natural, which is player advantageous and not possible in either Spanish 21 or blackjack.
2. Because the dealer has no hole card, it is possible to double and/or split and lose multiple bets to a dealer natural. All casinos, except for Adelaide Casino, offer either BB+1 or OBBO to compensate.
3. An Ace in a pre-double hand is always counted as 1, rather than 1 or 11. For example, if the player doubles on soft 18 (an Ace plus one or more cards totaling 7), he/she is essentially doubling on 8. This rule makes doubling on soft hands highly inadvisable.
4. Players are not allowed to draw on split Aces (NDSA), which means that if the player splits Aces, he/she is given one card only on each Ace.
5. Compared with Spanish 21, which allows splitting to four hands (SPL3), there are limitations on how many hands players are allowed to split to. Casinos in Queensland and New South Wales do not permit resplitting (SPL1). In most venues, players cannot resplit aces (SPA1), apart from Burswood Casino, Perth, and Casino de Genting, Malaysia, where it is allowed to resplit once (SPL2).
6. Players can only surrender against a dealer ace or face (a.k.a., picture) card. If the dealer ends up with a natural, the player will still lose the entire bet; moreover, he/she missed out on the opportunity to draw to "21" and win unconditionally. This is why surrendering is a less valuable play in Pontoon than in Spanish 21.
7. In Adelaide Casino and Casino de Genting, Malaysia, it is allowed to double only on two-card hands. Elsewhere, players can double on any number of cards, which is called "not last chance" (NLC) doubling.
8. The dealer always hits on soft 17, abbreviated as H17.
9. Pontoon has the same super bonus payouts are Spanish 21, with the exception of Casino de Genting, Malaysia, which has a super bonus payout of RM1,000 on bets of RM10 to RM99, and RM5,000 on bets of RM100 or above.

Despite the player disadvantage of rules 2–9, on average, the house edges for Pontoon are lower than for Spanish 21, because rule 1 is so profoundly player advantageous. The rule differences mean that there are several significant strategy differences between Spanish 21 and Pontoon.

=== OBBO and BB+1 ===
- BB+1 (Busted Bets plus one): After removing from the table all busted bets, all winnings and original bets from hands totaling 21, and all original bets from forfeited hands, the player loses just one bet, even if he has multiple split hands in the one box.
- OBBO (Original Bets and Busted Only): After removing from the table all busted bets, all winnings and original bets from hands totaling 21, and all original bets from forfeited hands, the player loses just one bet from each split hand remaining. If he has not split, he loses just one bet.

In summary, BB+1 is a loss of one bet per box, and OBBO is a loss of one bet per hand, given that busted bets, winnings, and original bets from forfeits and winning hands have been removed from the table. BB+1 is the more common of the two rules; the only casinos that have OBBO are Burswood Casino in Perth, and Casino de Genting, Malaysia.

== Basic strategy ==
Because pontoon has an element of player choice, players can reduce the casino advantage to less than 0.5% (with the exception of Adelaide, with house edge 0.62%), by playing optimally. The complete set of optimal plays is known as basic strategy, and is highly dependent on the rules. The computer-generated Pontoon basic strategy and house edge tables below are reproduced from The Pro's Guide to Spanish 21 and Australian Pontoon, with permission of the author, Katarina Walker. Pontoon strategy is far more difficult than Blackjack, however, casinos do not generally object to people using strategy charts at the table.

Pontoon strategy is very similar to Spanish 21 strategy, but there are some crucial differences, mainly due to the no-hole-card rule, and the limitations on soft doubling.

Pontoon does, on average, have a lower house edge than its American counterparts because the player is paid out immediately on any total of 21, regardless of whether the dealer ends up with a natural (a blackjack). In standard American blackjack, the dealer checks for blackjack before the player acts, and a dealer blackjack ends the hand immediately; the player loses all their bets unless they also have a natural.

Your hand	Dealer's face-up card									
Your hand	2	3	4	5	6	7	8	9	10	A
Hard totals
18–21	S	S	S	S	S	S	S	S	S	S
17	S	S	S	S	S	S	S6	S6	S6	H
16	S6	S6	S6	S	S	H	H	H	H	H
15	S4.	S5:	S6	S6	S	H	H	H	H	H
14	H	H	S4.	S5:	S6;	H	H	H	H	H
13	H	H	H	H	S4.	H	H	H	H	H
12	H	H	H	H	H	H	H	H	H	H
11	D4	D5	D5	D5	D5	D4	D4	D4	D4	D4
10	D5	D5	D	D	D	D4	D3	H	H	H
9	H	H	H	H	D	H	H	H	H	H
5–8	H	H	H	H	H	H	H	H	H	H
Soft totals
	2	3	4	5	6	7	8	9	10	A
A,9	S	S	S	S	S	S	S	S	S	S
A,8	S	S	S	S	S	S	S	S	S5	S5
A,7	S4	S4	S4	S4	S4	S6	S4	H	H	H
A,2 – A,6	H	H	H	H	H	H	H	H	H	H
Pairs
	2	3	4	5	6	7	8	9	10	A
A,A	P	P	P	P	P	P	P	P	P	H
10,10	S	S	S	S	S	S	S	S	S	S
9,9	S	P	P	P	P	S	P	P	S	S
8,8	P	P	P	P	P	P	P	P	P	H
7,7	P	P	P	P	P	P:	H	H	H	H
6,6	H	H	P	P	P	H	H	H	H	H
5,5	D	D	D	D	D	D	D	H	H	H
4,4	H	H	H	H	H	H	H	H	H	H
3,3	P	P	P	P	P	P	P	H	H	H
2,2	P	P	P	P	P	P	P	H	H	H
Forfeit strategy
	2	3	4	5	6	7	8	9	10	A
12–16	S	S	S	S	S	S	F	F	F	F
17	S	S	S	S	S	S	S	S	S	F
18–20	S	S	S	S	S	S	S	S	S	S

The above is a basic strategy table for all Pontoon rule variations, with a few exceptions: if no OBBO/BB+1, hit 11 vs X and A; if no OBBO/BB+1 and no Ace re-splits, hit A-A vs X; if last chance doubling, split 4-4 vs 6.

Key:

H = Hit
P = Split
F = Forfeit after doubling
S = Stand (or play on after doubling)
S4 = Stand, but hit if 4 or more cards
S5 = Stand, but hit if 5 or more cards
S6 = Stand, but hit if 6 or more cards
. = Hit if 6-7-8 possible
: = Hit if suited 6-7-8 or 7-7-7 possible
; = Hit if spaded 6-7-8 possible
D = Double
D3 = Double, but hit if 3 or more cards
D4 = Double, but hit if 4 or more cards
D5 = Double, but hit if 5 or more cards

== House edge ==
The following table lists the Pontoon house edges for all known rule sets. The house edge is equivalent to the house advantage over a player who is following the basic strategy tabulated above. (The figures were obtained from 10-billion hand simulations and have a standard error of 0.001%. The super bonus is averaged out to a 100:1 payout.) (SPL3 = can split three times to form four hands, SPL2 = can split twice to form three hands, SPL1 = can split once only, SPA1 = no Ace resplits, NLC = not last chance doubling, D9 = doubling on 9–11 only)

Pontoon Rules	Decks	House Edge
OBBO, SPL2, NLC	8	0.34%
BB+1, SPL3, SPA1, NLC	4	0.31%
BB+1, SPL1, NLC	6	0.41%
BB+1, SPL1, NLC	8	0.38%
BB+1, SPL2, SPA1, NLC	8	0.40%
SPL2, SPA1, D9	8	0.62%
OBBO, SPL2, SPA1	8	0.50%

As all Australian casino Blackjack games have house edges greater than 0.5%, Pontoon is the superior of the two games. In general, casino staff and Blackjack players erroneously believe that Pontoon has a higher house edge than Blackjack, because the removal of the ten-spot cards creates a 2% disadvantage for the player. In Pontoon, the player can draw to "21" and win against a dealer Blackjack; this combined with "not-last-chance" doubling, forfeit, player "21" always wins, player Blackjacks always get paid at 3:2, and bonuses on certain hands, actually overcompensates for the 2% disadvantage. The result is that Pontoon, on average, has about two-thirds the house edge of Australian Blackjack, which due to no surrender, hole card, and limitations on soft doubling, has some of the highest house edges for regular Blackjack in the world.

== Variations ==
=== Federal Pontoon ===
Federal Pontoon is a version of the Australian casino game Pontoon played in Tasmania, Australia. Both casinos in Tasmania, Country Club Casino, Launceston, and Wrest Point Casino, Hobart, are owned by the Federal Group.

Rules specific to Federal Pontoon are:

- 6 decks, dealt from a continuous shuffle machine.
- Re-splitting to 3 hands is permitted, except for Aces.
- BB+1.

In Wrest Point Casino, Federal Pontoon is played in the public area only and is not available in the VIP room.

=== Jupiters 21 ===
Jupiters 21 is a version of the Australian casino game Pontoon played in Jupiters Casino, Gold Coast, Queensland, Australia.

Rules specific to Jupiters 21 are:

- 4 decks dealt from a continuous shuffling machine (CSM).
- No re-splits are allowed.
- BB+1.

Jupiters 21 is played in the public area of Jupiters Casino only, and not available in the VIP room, Club Conrad. All Pontoon games played in Queensland casinos have the same rules.

=== Treasury 21 ===
Treasury 21 is a version of the Australian casino game Pontoon played in Treasury Casino, Brisbane, Queensland, Australia.

Rules specific to Treasury 21 are:

- In the public area of Treasury Casino, 6 decks are dealt from a continuous shuffling machine (CSM).
- In the VIP room, 6 decks are dealt from a shoe.
- No resplits are allowed.
- BB+1.

All Pontoon games played in Queensland casinos have the same rules.

== See also ==
- Spanish 21
