= Perfect shuffle =

Perfect shuffle may refer to:

- Faro shuffle, in particular the interpretation whereby cards (or more generally, entities in sequence) are divided into two equal piles and interleaved.
- Any shuffling algorithm that guarantees perfect randomness (all possible orders with equal probability), such as the Fisher–Yates shuffle.
