= Progressive jackpot =

Gambling prize that increases until won

A progressive jackpot is a jackpot (a gambling grand prize or payout) which increases each time the game is played but the jackpot is not won. When the progressive jackpot is won, the jackpot for the next play is reset to a predetermined value, and resumes increasing under the same rule.

Many slot machines and video poker machines feature a progressive jackpot. The jackpot increases by a small predetermined amount each time the game is played. Often multiple machines are pooled or linked together to form a larger progressive jackpot which grows more quickly because more non-winning plays can be counted toward it.

Many lotteries feature progressive jackpots. After each drawing in which the jackpot is not won, a large amount of money is "carried forward" to the jackpot for next drawing. Various television game shows have also featured progressive jackpots.

== History ==
Progressive jackpots were first introduced in large casinos in 1986. The first progressive slot machine was Megabucks, developed by International Game Technology (IGT). Every time a player participated in the jackpot but did not hit it, a part of the winnings was accumulated to the main jackpot, growing without limit. On February 1, 1987, a player won the first progressive jackpot, which amounted to the sum of $4,988,842.17.

== Progressive jackpot meter ==
The amount of the jackpot increases by a small amount for every play on any connected machine. The amount by which the jackpot advances is set by the casino ("the house"). A machine offering a progressive jackpot usually displays the amount of the jackpot, rather boldly, to attract players. After a player wins the jackpot, the jackpot resets to a preset minimum level.

For example, on a machine whose house edge is 5%, a generous jackpot contribution might be 1% (one fifth of the expected profit). The house is prepared to contribute some of the profit of a jackpot linked machine because players are attracted by the:

- relative novelty of progressive jackpots (generally, only a small fraction of the house's gaming machines will be connected to a progressive jackpot)
- constantly changing meter, often displayed on large LCD or LED displays
- large amount of the jackpot, which eventually motivates more players to play the game.

== Qualifying ==
Usually the progressive jackpot is only offered to players who wager the maximum number of credits per play. All wagers, whether or not they are maximum-credit bets, contribute to the jackpot. As a result, a game which requires a 10-credit wager to qualify for the progressive jackpot tends to have its progressive jackpot rise to higher levels (relative to its break-even level) than a game that requires only a 5-credit wager to qualify.

Usually the jackpot can only be won by winning the combination with the highest payoff, e.g. a royal flush at a video poker game, or five of the most valuable symbols (lemons, cherries, alligators, etc.) on a slot machine.

Often, the displayed amount of such jackpots includes a base payout which is often simply the regular payout for the winning combination multiplied by the minimum qualifying bet. If the jackpot is "reset" to this amount each time it is won then in essence the house is not providing any "seed money" for the jackpot since the minimum that can be won in such a case would simply be the amount the player would normally be awarded for the jackpot-winning combination.

== "Mystery" or "must-hit-by" jackpots ==
A variation of the standard progressive jackpot is the "must-hit-by" jackpot, which has substantial differences compared to traditional jackpots.

The value of every "must-hit-by" jackpot is determined immediately after the preceding jackpot is won by a random number generator and stored within an encrypted computer connected to a gaming machine (or, more commonly, a network of machines) and is publicly disclosed to be within a certain range (for example, a small jackpot might be programmed to pay out at between $1,000 and $3,000). The jackpot pays on the wager that causes the jackpot to reach or exceed the threshold, with the maximum value within this range being the "must-hit-by" amount.

Often such jackpots encompass a variety of games, with each game contributing a small percentage of wagers to the jackpot. Thus, these jackpots are often billed as "mystery jackpots" since the conditions that cause them to be paid do not depend on achieving any specific result in the main game. Furthermore, it is not usually necessary to bet the maximum amount possible (or, often, to even bet any minimal amount above the minimum wager allowed by the software) in order to win a "mystery jackpot" - although since it is a percentage of each wager that goes into the jackpot the odds of winning on a particular spin are usually in proportion to the amount of the bet. Or, to put it another way, one spin for twenty dollars would have the same odds of winning the mystery jackpot as twenty spins for one dollar each would, and also the same odds of winning the jackpot as would four hundred spins for five cents each.

Often, such games have several "mystery jackpots" that usually differ by at least an order of magnitude both in terms of magnitude and frequency of payout, which can ensure that jackpots are seen to be won frequently (often, many times per day in the case of relatively small jackpots). One variation of this scheme (most often used by gaming corporations serving brick-and-mortar establishments over a large geographic footprint) is to have one main jackpot, several intermediate jackpots paid at the regional level, smaller jackpots paid at the site level and/or the smallest jackpots tied to each individual machine.

From the house perspective, a key financial consideration of such jackpots is that the portion of players' wagers directed to the jackpot are, in essence, only funding the portion of the jackpot within its specified "range." The gaming operator needs to fund each jackpot's minimum amount from the house edge of the main game, which is usually at least a third of the "must-hit-by" amount especially in games with multiple jackpots as this creates an assurance that each jackpot will always be several times the value of the jackpot "below" it. If the random number generator gives each value within the jackpot "range" an equal chance of being the "winning" value then under these conditions "seed money" from the house would likely account for over half of the jackpot's total funding, for which the house would presumably need to compensate by increasing the house edge of the main game.

To counteract this issue and increase the average amount wagered before each jackpot is won, the mathematical formula used to calculate each jackpot is often skewed in such a way that makes it likely the actual average and median jackpots will be well above the average of the published minimum and maximum values. A simple example formula that would achieve this (expanding on the aforementioned example) would be simply to calculate the jackpot as being $1,000 plus the square root of a random number between zero and four million, which would result in a 75% probability of each jackpot being between $2,000 and $3,000 and a 25% probability of a jackpot being between $1,000 and $2,000.

== Break-even point ==
In some games such as video poker, blackjack, or Caribbean Stud Poker, it is possible to compute an optimal playing strategy based on the average payoff (the amount of payoff times the chance of payoff). Because the jackpot of a progressive game constantly grows, it sometimes exceeds the break-even point for players, such that the jackpot wager becomes a "positive expectation bet" for the player, with an average return to player (RTP) of greater than 100%. When the progressive jackpot is less than the break-even point, there is a negative expected value (house edge) for all players.

In the long run, with optimal strategy, a player can profit by only playing progressive games when their jackpots are above the break-even point, although the "long run" can be quite long, tens of thousands of plays.

The break-even point is difficult to calculate on a slot machine because its payback percentage is usually unknown to the player. In poker-based games, the break-even point can be determined since the payback percentage depends on the paybacks and odds of hands from a standard 52-card deck. A slot machine's return is based on the published paytable and the usually unpublished reel layout. For a five-reel slot, the player would need to know every symbol on each reel to calculate the odds. For a three-reel slot, the reels are typically weighted, making this impossible. In some cases, however, the manufacturer may publish the machine's payout.

Many online casinos offer the same game in multiple currencies, which can change the break-even point and return to player. This happens because the jackpot may be converted between currencies so that winners receive the same value, while the qualifying wager is not converted. For example, a game that pays a $1000 / €900 / £700 jackpot but requires a fixed $1 / €1 / £1 wager makes it more advantageous to play in dollars, since the qualifying wager is a smaller proportion of the jackpot. As a result, the break-even point is lower and the return to player higher when betting in dollars.

== Advantage play ==
Those who play only when a progressive jackpot offers a positive expectation still generate revenue for the casino, as most of the jackpot has been funded by previous non-winning players.

Advantage gamblers sometimes organize teams to play machines with positive-expectation jackpots. These teams can displace ordinary players, making the machines unavailable when they are most attractive. Team members often coordinate by cell phone and work in shifts, calling replacements when they need a break. Some casinos enforce "no team play" policies and eject players suspected of participating in such groups. These tactics do not work at online casinos, where an unlimited number of duplicate machines prevents a single player or team from monopolizing the game.

== Player's clubs ==
Most casinos offer slot clubs, which pay back a percentage of a gambler's wagers on their games in the form of cash rebates or other perks with a monetary value. Participating in a slot club can reduce the break-even point of a progressive jackpot game because of the value of the rebate on each wager.

== Other jackpot games ==
Progressive jackpots are not limited to slot machines and video poker. Poker games sometimes include a progressive bad beat jackpot. Caribbean stud poker is another casino game which often has a progressive jackpot available, and some online casinos offer progressive versions of blackjack, roulette, and other casino games. Many lotteries feature progressive jackpots.

== Progressive blackjack ==
A progressive blackjack game usually does not differ from conventional blackjack, apart from the addition of an optional side bet which gives the player a chance to win a progressive jackpot. The side bet wins if the player is dealt one of several specific card combinations such as four suited aces. The awards can range from several dollars up to 100% of the jackpot depending on the different card combinations, and the winning hand paytable can differ between casinos.
