= Vexillary =

Vexillary may refer to:

- an adjective meaning "flag-like"
- the carrier of a Roman vexillum
- Vexillary permutation in mathematics
