= Spanish 21 =

Blackjack variant

Spanish 21 is a blackjack variant owned by Masque Publishing Inc., a gaming publishing company based in Colorado. Unlicensed, but equivalent, versions may be called Spanish blackjack. In Australia and Malaysia, an unlicensed version of the game, with no dealer hole card and significant rule differences, is played in casinos under the name "Pontoon". It was first introduced about 1995.

== Rules ==
Spanish 21 is played on a blackjack table with a custom layout and uses the following rules:

- The game is played with six or eight decks dealt from a shoe, or from a continuous shuffling machine (CSM). Spanish 21 is played with 48-card Spanish decks, although standard French suited 52-card decks are used with the 4 ten-spot cards removed. All cards have the same values as in blackjack.
- The dealer gets a hole card.
- Like traditional blackjack, the dealer hits on 16 and stands on 17. In some venues, the dealer hits on a soft 17 (abbreviated as H17), though most venues have the dealer stand on soft 17 (S17). Hitting soft 17 (H17) negatively impacts the player; that rule increases the house edge by 0.40%.
- Blackjack (a natural total of 21 on the first two cards) always wins, and is always paid 3:2 regardless of whether or not the dealer has a blackjack.
- Insurance is paid 2:1, just like in blackjack, despite the fact that there are four fewer ten-valued cards per deck. As 3 cards in 12 are worth ten, the chance of the dealer getting a blackjack when showing an Ace is only 25%. Therefore, for insurance to be an even bet, it would have to pay 3:1, not 2:1. The house edge on the insurance is 24.7%, one of the worst of any wager in a casino.
- Hitting, standing, and splitting all follow similar rules to blackjack. Doubling after splitting (DAS) is always permitted, and, in most venues, players are allowed to draw as many cards as they wish after splitting aces, or may double down after receiving second or subsequent cards.
- Players can split to a maximum of four hands, even on aces.
- In most venues, if the dealer does not have blackjack, players may surrender, and get half their bet back in exchange for relinquishing the right to play on. This type of surrender is known as a "late surrender" (LS).
- Players can surrender after doubling (sometimes called forfeit, double-down rescue, or concede). The dealer takes the original bet, and the player retains the double portion of the bet. This is because the player is allowed to double down for less than the original bet.
- Once the initial two-card hands are dealt, if the dealer is showing an Ace or face card, he peeks underneath the hole card to check for a blackjack, before playing actually commences. If he has blackjack, all players automatically lose, unless they also have a blackjack (which, as mentioned above, automatically win 3:2).
- The player may double down on any total and on any number of cards.
- In some casinos, players may double double down, or redouble up to two times after doubling down. For example: The player bets one unit and is dealt 2-3, giving a hand total of 5; the dealer is showing a 6. The player doubles the first time and draws a 3. The hand total is now 8 and the total amount wagered is two units. The player doubles a second time and draws a 3. The hand total is now 11 and the total amount wagered is four units. When the player doubles a third time on 11, the total amount wagered will be eight units. Redoubling is a profoundly player-advantageous rule, when optimally executed.
- A total of 21 always wins for the player. It never pushes against the dealer's 21.
- A five-card 21 pays 3:2, a six-card 21 pays 2:1, and a 21 with seven or more cards pays 3:1. A 21 composed of 6-7-8 or 7-7-7 of mixed suits pays 3:2, of the same suit pays 2:1, and of spades pays 3:1. These bonus payouts apply even if the hand was the result of a split. However, doubling down negates these bonuses.
- A "super bonus" of $1000 for bets under $25, and $5000 for bets of $25 and over, is paid on a suited 7-7-7 against any dealer 7. All other players at the table receive a $50 "envy bonus". Splitting or doubling down negates the "super bonus".

The removal of the four tens in each deck gives roughly a 2% advantage to the dealer. The liberal rules of Spanish 21, though, do compensate for this. With optimal play, the house edge of a Spanish 21 table is lower than that of a blackjack table with the same rules on hitting or standing on soft 17.

The game also offers an optional "Match the Dealer" side bet, which compares a player's cards with the dealer's upcard. Matching the rank of the dealer's card pays 4:1 on a six-deck game, and 3:1 on an eight-deck game, while a "perfect match" of rank and suit pays 9:1 on six decks and 12:1 on eight decks. A player may win on both cards; (e.g. if a player has 8s 8c and the dealer has 8c as an upcard, the player will receive 3:1 on the rank match and 12:1 on the perfect match, paying out a total of 15:1.) While this side bet has a house edge of approximately 3%, significantly higher than the edge of the main game, it is one of the lowest house edges of any blackjack side bet.

== House edge ==
The following tables list the Spanish 21 house edges for all rule sets found in North America. The figures were obtained from 10-billion hand simulations and have a standard error of 0.001%. The super bonus is averaged out to a 100:1 payout.

These charts assume that the player is using basic strategy. "H17" means that the dealer hits soft seventeen, "S17" means that the dealer stands on soft seventeen.

Rules	Decks	House Edge
H17	6	0.78%
H17	8	0.80%
S17	6	0.37%
S17	8	0.38%
H17 with redoubling	6	0.42%
H17 with redoubling	8	0.45%

Rule Changes	Change in House Edge
No surrender (H17)	0.018%
No surrender (S17)	0.006%
No draws on split Aces (H17 or S17)	0.28%
No draws on split Aces (H17 with redoubling)	0.29%
Natural after split pays 3:2	–0.16%

== Match the Dealer ==
Match the Dealer is a side bet offered on most Spanish 21 games. The player wins the side bet if the rank of either or both of their initial two cards matches the rank of the dealer's up card. If the cards match in both rank and suit, the player wins a bigger payout. Some casinos offer a second Match the Dealer bet which wins when either or both of the player's initial two cards match the dealer's hole card. The payouts and the house edge vary depending on the number of decks in play as shown below.

Number of Decks	Non-Suited Match	Double Non-Suited Match	Suited Match	Suited + Non-Suited Match	Double Suited Match	House Edge
2	4:1	8:1	15:1	19:1	NA	3.63%
4	4:1	8:1	10:1	14:1	20:1	3.20%
5	3:1	6:1	13:1	16:1	26:1	3.53%
6	4:1	8:1	9:1	13:1	18:1	3.06%
8	3:1	6:1	12:1	15:1	24:1	2.99%
