= Return to player =

Gambling statistic

Return to player (RTP) is a term used in gambling and online games to refer to the percentage of prizes that will be returned to a player depending on funds deposited during the game initially. Return to player is one of the ways to attract players.

In Australia and the UK, information about the game cost often includes return-to-player values (for example, the average payout percentage or the percentage of money stakes saved) in order to protect players.

The UK Gambling Commission allows customers to be informed about the risks in the form of return-to-player or house-edge percentages. For example, a casino may inform the player about a payout percentage of 90%, which means that for $100 bet $90 is going to be returned. The same is for "house-edge percentage" meaning that the casino is having $10 for every $100 spent on the game. Both variants are identical, however in accordance with the so-called framing effect, there is a certain influence on players due to different ways of perception.

According to the results of a study made by the UK Gambling Commission in 2014, it was discovered that a number of users not specializing in the industry do not understand the mechanism of return-to-player. Thus, the complex terms, the usage of mathematical concepts and formulations, the information in English, are mentioned among factors of misunderstanding, which worsens the comprehension of the rules for non-native English speakers.

All the slot machines at Crown Perth in Australia have a 90% minimum return-to-player percentage. In 2018, The Federal Court of Australia enacted in a lawsuit against a large casino in Melbourne that information about the nature of return-to-player is misleading for players, since it indicates the percentage of winnings for a long-term game, which is not true for a short-term one.

Some software developers choose to publish the RTP of their slot machines, while others do not. Despite various RTP theories, almost any outcome is possible in the short term perspective.

== See also ==
- Slot machine
- Gambling mathematics
- Progressive jackpot
- Fixed odds betting terminal
