= Persi Diaconis =

American mathematician and statistician

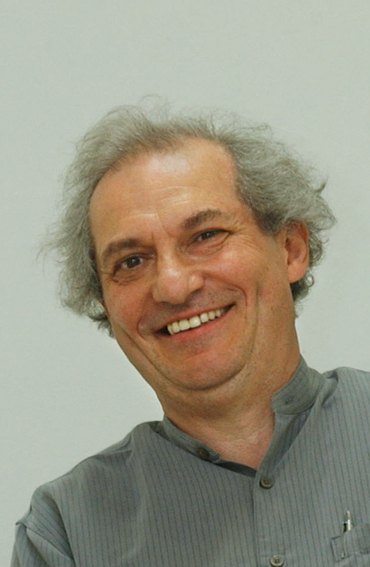
- Diaconis in 2010
- Born: January 31, 1945 (age 81); New York City, US
- Education: City College of New York (BS); Harvard University (MA, PhD)
- Known for: Freedman–Diaconis rule
- Spouse: Susan Holmes
- Scientific career
- Fields: Mathematical statistics
- Workplaces: Harvard University; Stanford University
- Doctoral advisor: Dennis Arnold Hejhal; Frederick Mosteller
- Doctoral students: Sourav Chatterjee; Eduardo Engel; Elizabeth Meckes; Igor Pak; Eric Rains; Jeff Rosenthal; Francis Su; Elizabeth Wilmer; Arif Zaman

Persi Warren Diaconis (/ˌdaɪəˈkoʊnɪs/; born January 31, 1945) is an American mathematician of Greek descent and former professional magician. He is the Mary V. Sunseri Professor of Statistics and Mathematics at Stanford University.

He is particularly known for tackling mathematical problems involving randomness and randomization, such as coin flipping and shuffling playing cards.

== Biography ==
Diaconis left home at 14 to travel with magician Dai Vernon, and was awarded a high school diploma based on grades given to him by his teachers after dropping out of George Washington High School. He returned to school at age 24 to learn math, motivated to read William Feller's famous two-volume treatise on probability theory, An Introduction to Probability Theory and Its Applications. He attended the City College of New York for his undergraduate work, graduating in 1971, and then obtained a Ph.D. in mathematical statistics from Harvard University in 1974 and became a mathematical probabilist.

According to Martin Gardner, at school, Diaconis supported himself by playing poker on ships between New York and South America. Gardner recalls that Diaconis had "fantastic second deal and bottom deal".

Diaconis is married to Stanford statistics professor Susan Holmes.

== Career ==
Diaconis received a MacArthur Fellowship in 1982. In 1990, he published (with Dave Bayer) a paper entitled "Trailing the Dovetail Shuffle to Its Lair" (a term coined by magician Charles Jordan in the early 1900s) which established rigorous results on how many times a deck of playing cards must be riffle shuffled before it can be considered random according to the mathematical measure total variation distance. Diaconis is often cited for the simplified proposition that it takes seven shuffles to randomize a deck. More precisely, Diaconis showed that, in the Gilbert–Shannon–Reeds model of how likely it is that a riffle results in a particular riffle shuffle permutation, it takes 5 riffles before the total variation distance of a 52-card deck begins to drop significantly from the maximum value of 1.0, and 7 riffles before it drops below 0.5 very quickly (a threshold phenomenon), after which it is reduced by a factor of 2 every shuffle. When entropy is viewed as the probabilistic distance, riffle shuffling seems to take less time to mix, and the threshold phenomenon goes away (because the entropy function is subadditive).

Diaconis has coauthored several more recent papers expanding on his 1992 results and relating the problem of shuffling cards to other problems in mathematics. Among other things, they showed that the separation distance of an ordered blackjack deck (that is, aces on top, followed by 2's, followed by 3's, etc.) drops below .5 after 7 shuffles. Separation distance is an upper bound for variation distance.

Diaconis has been hired by casino executives to search for subtle flaws in their automatic card shuffling machines. Diaconis soon found some and the horrified executives responded, "We are not pleased with your conclusions but we believe them and that's what we hired you for."

He served on the Mathematical Sciences jury of the Infosys Prize in 2011 and 2012.

== Recognition ==
- 1982 – Awarded a MacArthur Fellowship
- 1982 – Awarded the Rollo Davidson Prize
- 1990 – Invited Speaker of the International Congress of Mathematicians (ICM)
- 1995 – Elected to the National Academy of Sciences
- 1997 – Gibbs Lecturer, American Mathematical Society
- 1998 – Plenary Speaker of the ICM
- 2003 – Received an Honorary D. Sci. from the University of Chicago
- 2005 – Elected to the American Philosophical Society
- 2006 – Awarded the Van Wijngaarden Award
- 2012 – Awarded the Levi L. Conant Prize
- 2012 – Fellow of the American Mathematical Society
- 2013 – Received an Honorary Degree from the University of St Andrews
- 2014 – Recipient of Cahit Arf Lecture by Middle East Technical University

== Works ==
The books written or coauthored by Diaconis include:

- Group Representations In Probability And Statistics (Institute of Mathematical Statistics, 1988)
- Magical Mathematics: The Mathematical Ideas That Animate Great Magic Tricks (with Ronald L. Graham, Princeton University Press, 2012), winner of the 2013 Euler Book Prize
- Ten Great Ideas about Chance (with Brian Skyrms, Princeton University Press, 2018)

His other publications include:

- "Theories of data analysis: from magical thinking through classical statistics", in Hoaglin, D.C., ed. (1985). Exploring Data Tables, Trends, and Shapes. Wiley. ISBN 0-471-09776-4.
- Diaconis, P. (1978). "Statistical problems in ESP research". Science. 201 (4351): 131–136. Bibcode:1978Sci...201..131D. doi:10.1126/science.663642. PMID 663642.
- Diaconis, P.; Holmes, S; Montgomery, R (2007). "Dynamical bias in the coin toss". SIAM Review. 49 (2): 211–235. Bibcode:2007SIAMR..49..211D. doi:10.1137/S0036144504446436.

== See also ==
- Freedman–Diaconis rule
- Mathemagician
- Patience sorting
- Random walk
