= Susan P. Holmes =

American biostatistician

Susan Holmes
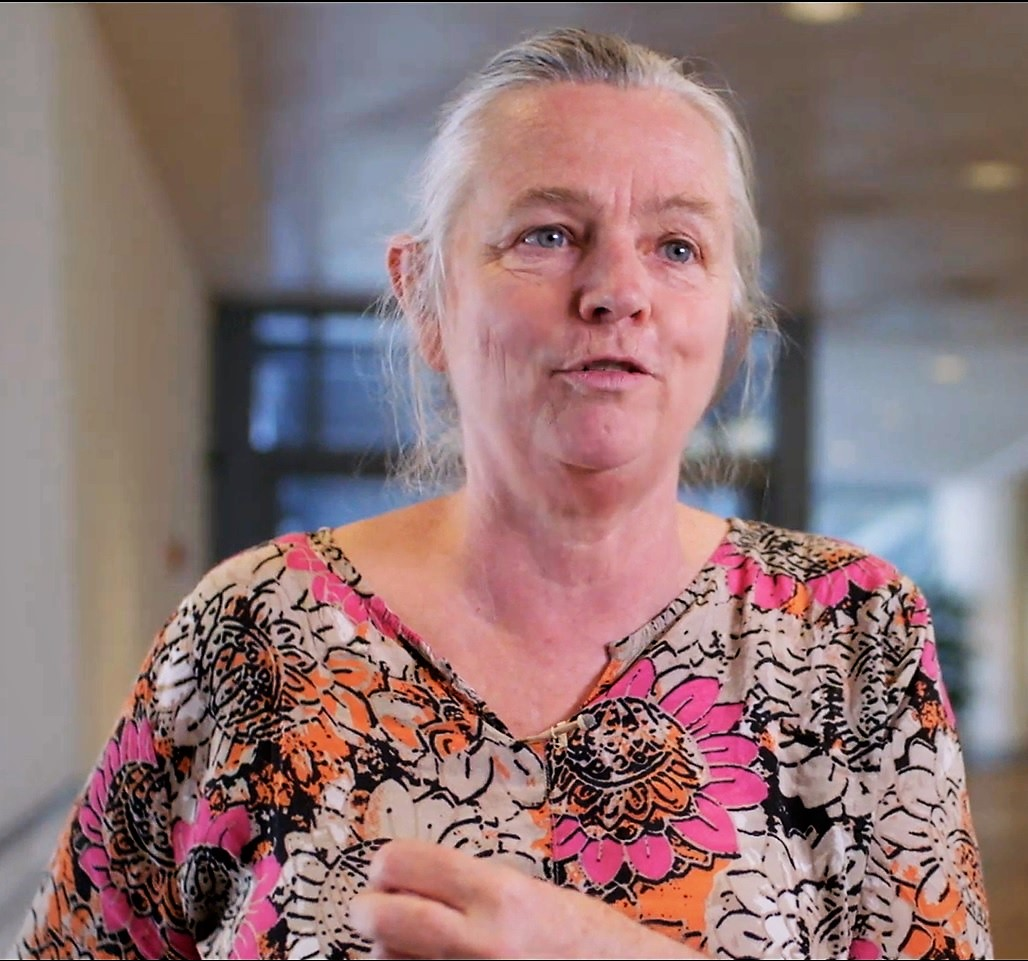
- Holmes in 2019
- Education: Université Montpellier II
- Spouse: Persi Diaconis
- Awards: Fellow of the Institute of Mathematical Statistics (2005); NIH Director's Transformative Research Award (2013); Fellow of the Fields Institute (2015); NIPS Breiman Lecturer (2016)
- Scientific career
- Fields: Biostatistics
- Workplaces: INRA, Montpellier; MIT; Harvard University; Cornell University; Stanford University
- Thesis: Computer-Intensive Methods for the Evaluation of Results after an Exploratory Analysis (1985)
- Doctoral advisor: Yves Escoufier

Susan P. Holmes is an American statistician and professor at Stanford University. She is noted for her work in applying nonparametric multivariate statistics, bootstrapping methods, and data visualization to biology.

She received her PhD in 1985 from Université Montpellier II. She served as a tenured research scientist at INRA for ten years. She then taught at MIT and Harvard and was an associate professor of biometry at Cornell before moving to Stanford in 1998. She is married to fellow Stanford professor Persi Diaconis.

She is a Fellow of the Institute of Mathematical Statistics.
