= Eric M. Rains =

American mathematician

- Born: Eric Michael Rains; August 23, 1973 (age 53)
- Education: Case Western Reserve University; University of Cambridge; Harvard University
- Known for: Quantum error-correcting codes Self-dual codes Elliptic hypergeometric integrals
- Awards: Churchill Scholarship; Fellow of the American Mathematical Society
- Scientific career
- Fields: Mathematics, coding theory, special functions, random matrix theory, quantum information theory
- Workplaces: Center for Communications Research; AT&T Labs; University of California, Davis; California Institute of Technology
- Thesis: Topics in Probability on Compact Lie Groups (1995)
- Doctoral advisor: Persi Diaconis
- Website: pma.caltech.edu/people/eric-m-rains

Eric Michael Rains (born August 23, 1973) is an American mathematician and professor emeritus of mathematics at the California Institute of Technology. His research includes special functions, especially applications from and to noncommutative algebraic geometry, as well as earlier work in random matrix theory, coding theory, lattices, and quantum information theory.

== Education and career ==
Rains began classes at Case Western Reserve University in 1987, when he was 14 years old. He graduated from Case Western Reserve at age 17 with bachelor's degrees in computer science and physics and a master's degree in mathematics. His first peer-reviewed journal article, written with Case Western Reserve physicists Robert Brown and Cyrus Taylor, appeared in 1991.

Rains studied at the University of Cambridge as a Churchill Scholar during the 1991-1992 academic year, earning a Certificate of Advanced Study in Mathematics. He received his Ph.D. from Harvard University in 1995 with the dissertation Topics in Probability on Compact Lie Groups, supervised by Persi Diaconis.

From 1995 to 1996, Rains worked at the Institute for Defense Analyses' Center for Communications Research in Princeton. He was a researcher at AT&T Labs from 1996 to 2002, returned to the Center for Communications Research from 2002 to 2003, and became a professor at the University of California, Davis in 2003. He joined Caltech as professor in 2007, served as executive officer of the Caltech mathematics department from 2019 to 2022, and became professor emeritus in 2023.

== Research ==
Rains's work spans coding theory, random matrices, quantum information, special functions, noncommutative geometry, and number theory. In quantum information theory, Caltech identifies his most notable contribution as the additive construction with A. R. Calderbank, Peter Shor, and Neil Sloane, which constructs binary quantum codes from combinatorial data and produced stronger codes than previously known.

With Gabriele Nebe and Neil Sloane, Rains wrote the monograph Self-Dual Codes and Invariant Theory, published by Springer in 2006. With Bjorn Poonen, he developed a model for the distribution of p-Selmer groups of elliptic curves, later generalized by other researchers.

Rains was an invited speaker at the International Congress of Mathematicians in Hyderabad in 2010, where he spoke on elliptic analogues of the Macdonald and Koornwinder polynomials.

== Awards and honors ==
- Churchill Scholarship, 1991-1992
- Invited speaker, International Congress of Mathematicians, 2010
- Fellow of the American Mathematical Society, class of 2018, for contributions to coding theory, random matrices, special functions, noncommutative geometry, and number theory

== Selected publications ==
- Calderbank, A. R.; Rains, E. M.; Shor, P. W.; Sloane, N. J. A. (1997). "Quantum error correction and orthogonal geometry". Physical Review Letters. 78 (3): 405–408. arXiv:quant-ph/9605005. doi:10.1103/PhysRevLett.78.405.
- Rains, E. M. (1998). "Shadow bounds for self-dual codes". IEEE Transactions on Information Theory. 44: 134–139. doi:10.1109/18.651000.
- Calderbank, A. R.; Rains, E. M.; Shor, P. W.; Sloane, N. J. A. (1998). "Quantum error correction via codes over GF(4)". IEEE Transactions on Information Theory. 44 (4): 1369–1387. doi:10.1109/18.681315.
- Rains, E. M. (1999). "Nonbinary quantum codes". IEEE Transactions on Information Theory. 45 (6): 1827–1832. arXiv:quant-ph/9703048. doi:10.1109/18.782103.
- Bennett, Charles H.; DiVincenzo, David P.; Fuchs, Christopher A.; Mor, Tal; Rains, Eric; Shor, Peter W.; Smolin, John A.; Wootters, William K. (1999). "Quantum nonlocality without entanglement". Physical Review A. 59 (2): 1070–1091. arXiv:quant-ph/9804053. doi:10.1103/PhysRevA.59.1070.
- Borodin, Alexei; Rains, Eric M. (2005). "Eynard-Mehta theorem, Schur process, and their Pfaffian analogs". Journal of Statistical Physics. 121 (3–4): 291–317. arXiv:math-ph/0409059. doi:10.1007/s10955-005-7583-z.
- Rains, Eric M. (2010). "Transformations of elliptic hypergeometric integrals". Annals of Mathematics. 171 (1): 169–243. doi:10.4007/annals.2010.171.169.
- Poonen, Bjorn; Rains, Eric (2012). "Random maximal isotropic subspaces and Selmer groups". Journal of the American Mathematical Society. 25 (1): 245–269. arXiv:1009.0287. doi:10.1090/S0894-0347-2011-00710-8.
