= Interleave sequence =

Result of merging two sequences by perfect shuffling

In mathematics, an interleave sequence is obtained by merging two sequences via an in shuffle.

Let $S$ be a set, and let $(x_i)$ and $(y_i)$, $i=0,1,2,\ldots,$ be two sequences in $S.$ The interleave sequence is defined to be the sequence $x_0, y_0, x_1, y_1, \dots$. Formally, it is the sequence $(z_i), i=0,1,2,\ldots$ given by

$$z_i := \begin{cases} x_{i/2} & \text{ if } i \text{ is even,} \\
y_{(i-1)/2} & \text{ if } i \text{ is odd.}  \end{cases}$$

== Properties ==
- The interleave sequence $(z_i)$ is convergent if and only if the sequences $(x_i)$ and $(y_i)$ are convergent and have the same limit.
- Consider two real numbers a and b greater than zero and smaller than 1. One can interleave the sequences of digits of a and b, which will determine a third number c, also greater than zero and smaller than 1. In this way one obtains an injection from the square (0, 1) × (0, 1) to the interval (0, 1). Different radixes give rise to different injections; the one for the binary numbers is called the Z-order curve or Morton code.
