= Elizabeth Meckes =

American mathematician (1980–2020)

- Born: Elizabeth Samantha Meckes
- Education: Case Western Reserve University; Stanford University (PhD)
- Scientific career
- Workplaces: Case Western Reserve University
- Thesis: An Infinitesimal Version of Stein's Method of Exchangeable Pairs
- Doctoral advisor: Persi Diaconis

Elizabeth Samantha Meckes (1980–2020) was an American mathematician specializing in probability theory. Her research included work on Stein's method for bounding the distance between probability distributions and on random matrices. She was a professor of mathematics, applied mathematics, and statistics at Case Western Reserve University. She died in December 2020 after a brief battle with cancer.

== Education and career ==
Meckes went to Case Western Reserve University as an undergraduate, and graduated summa cum laude in 2001 with a bachelor's degree in mathematics and a minor in German. She remained at Case for a master's degree, which she completed in 2002. Her master's thesis, Harmonic Maps Between Graphs, was supervised by E. Jerome Benveniste.

Next, Meckes became a doctoral student of Persi Diaconis at Stanford University. She completed her Ph.D. there in 2006; her dissertation was An Infinitesimal Version of Stein’s Method.

After postdoctoral research at Cornell University and the American Institute of Mathematics, working with Laurent Saloff-Coste, Meckes returned to Case as a faculty member in 2007. She was tenured in 2013 and promoted to full professor in 2018.

== Books ==
With her husband Mark W. Meckes, Elizabeth Meckes wrote the textbook Linear Algebra (Cambridge University Press, 2018). She is also the author of The Random Matrix Theory of the Classical Compact Groups (Cambridge University Press, 2019).

== Recognition ==
In 2019, the Institute of Mathematical Statistics (IMS) recognized Meckes as an IMS Fellow, "for contributions to Stein’s method and to random matrix theory". She was twice named a Simons Fellow in Mathematics, in 2013 and 2020. She was a Fellow of the American Institute of Mathematics, 2006–2011.

In 2023, Case Western Reserve University began hosting an annual seminar series in her honor.
