= Shuffle track =

Blackjack technique

Shuffle tracking is an advantage gambling technique where a player tracks certain cards or sequences of cards through a series of shuffles. Shuffle tracking is typically done in blackjack games, although it can be done in other card games. Games with simple shuffles are generally easier to shuffle track than games with complicated shuffles. Thus, shuffle tracking is usually done in 6 or 8 deck shoe-dealt blackjack games, as these tend to have simpler shuffles compared to pitch games, due to the time required to accomplish a complicated shuffle on 6 or 8 decks of cards.

== Shuffle tracking ==
Shuffle tracking is an advanced technique used with card counting. Jerry Patterson published information about the technique in the 1970s and 1980s. Generally, a player tracks the count (high cards versus low cards) of one or more subsections of the deck as the cards are played. The selected sections may or may not be predetermined by observing and mapping the shuffle. These sections are referred to as tracking zones. The player may try to follow slugs of cards through the shuffle or have a good idea of the final location by previously analyzing the shuffle. After the shuffle, play zones exist which contain most of the cards in the tracking zone as well as other cards. The player can then cut zones with high cards into play, or with low cards out of play, thus changing the normal composition of the shoe. Betting can then be altered to reflect the altered composition.

== Ace sequencing ==
Another technique related to shuffle tracking is called ace sequencing. Ace sequencing tries to predict when an ace is about to be dealt. If a player knows they will be dealt an ace as their first card, they gain a 50.43% advantage. A player has roughly a 31% (depending on number of decks) chance of getting a blackjack and a good chance of making a strong hand even if they are not dealt a blackjack. First, the player should know what segments the discards are likely to appear relatively intact after a shuffle. They then observe aces as they are placed into the discard tray within a segment. Then they remember the two or three cards placed on top of the ace in the tray. These are called key cards. After the shuffle, the player looks for the key cards. The ace is likely to follow these cards, and the player can raise their bet in anticipation of getting the ace.

One of the first books to be published on ace sequencing was David McDowell's Blackjack Ace Prediction. Although critically acclaimed on its release in 2004, it was later discovered by Arnold Snyder that some of the mathematical theory in the book was faulty.

== See also ==
- Shuffling machine
