= Casino game =

Games played in gambling facilities

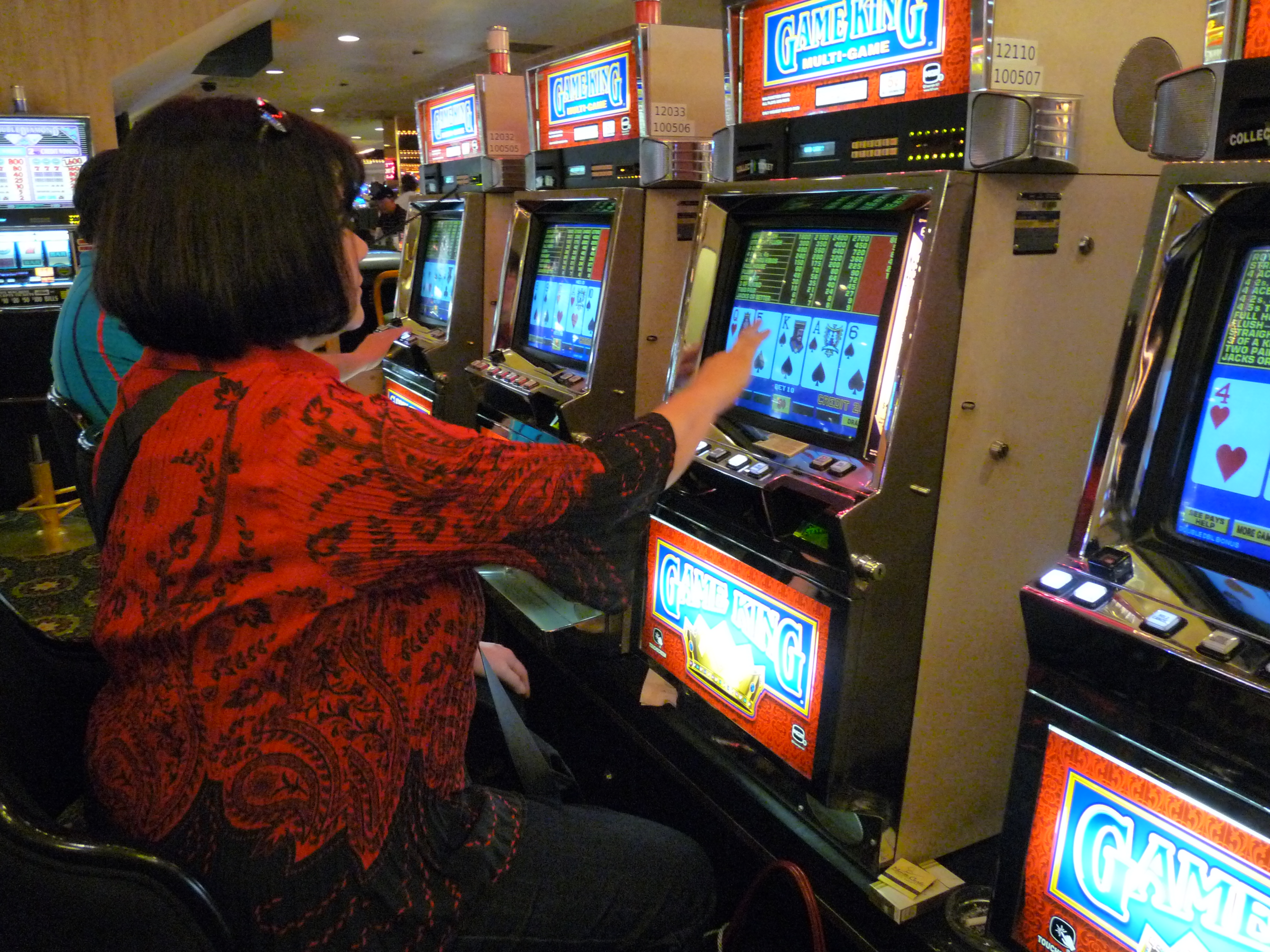
Gaming machines are a popular form of casino games

A casino game is one in which players gamble cash or chips on various possible random outcomes or combinations of outcomes, often in a casino environment. Such games are also available in online casinos, where permitted by law. Casino games can also be played outside of casinos for entertainment purposes, like in parties or in school competitions, on machines that simulate gambling.

== Categories ==
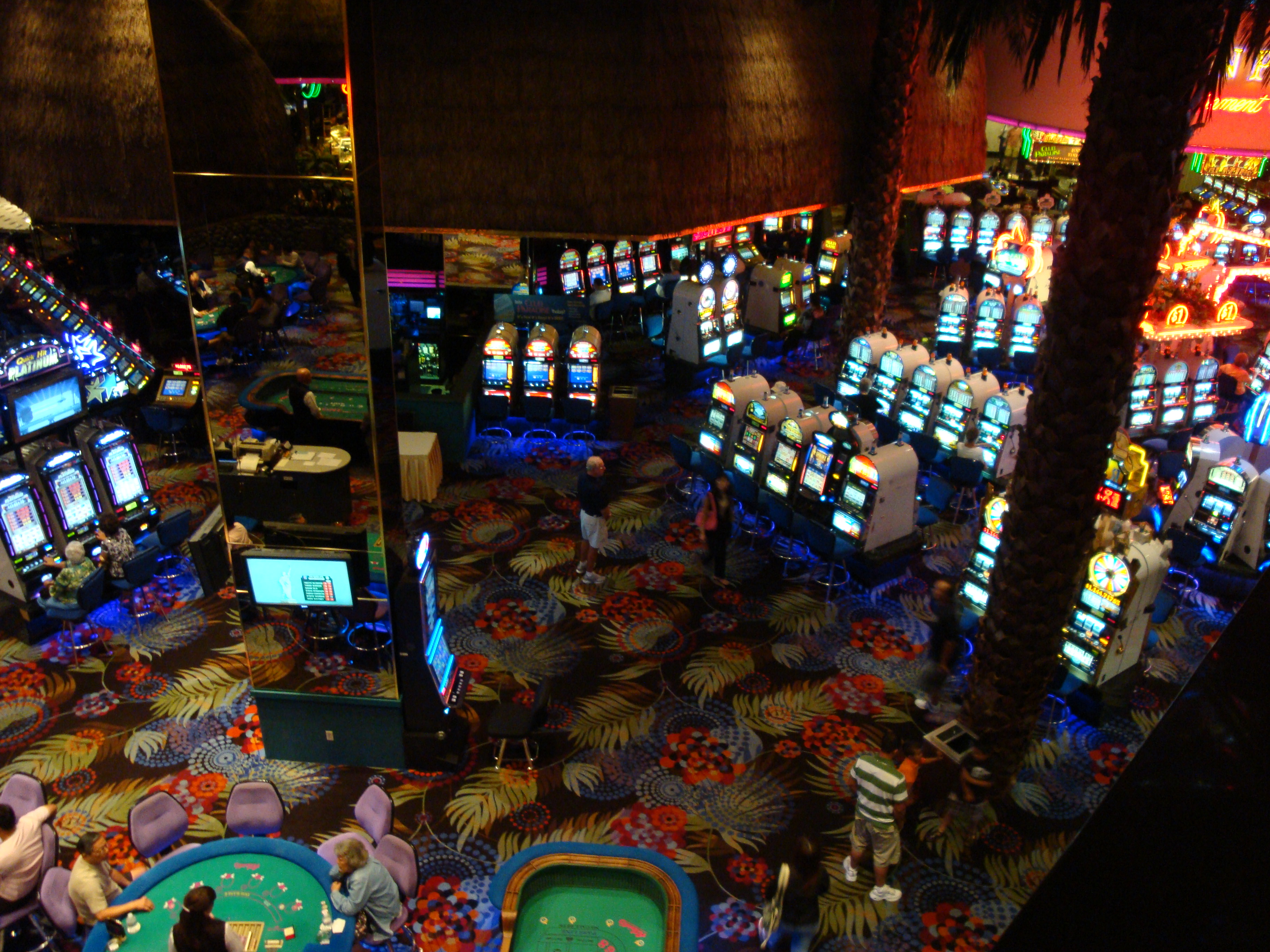
Overhead view of a casino floor with table games (bottom) and slot machines

There are three general categories of casino games: gambling machines, table games, and random number games. Gambling machines, such as slot machines and pachinko, are usually played by one player at a time and do not require the involvement of casino employees. Table games, such as blackjack or craps, involve one or more players who are competing against the house (the casino itself) rather than each other. Table games are usually conducted by casino employees known as croupiers or dealers. Random number games are based on the selection of random numbers, either from a computerized random number generator or from other gaming equipment. Random number games may be played at a table or through the purchase of paper tickets or cards, such as keno or bingo.

Some casino games combine multiple of the above aspects; for example, roulette is a table game conducted by a dealer, that involves random numbers. Casinos may also offer other types of gambling, such as hosting poker games or tournaments where players compete against each other.

== Common casino games ==
Games commonly found at casinos include table games, gambling machines and random number games.

=== Table games ===
In the United States, "table game" is the term used for games of chance such as blackjack, craps, roulette, and baccarat that are played against the casino and operated by one or more live croupiers, as opposed to those played on a mechanical device like a slot machine or against other players instead of the casino, such as standard poker.

Table games are popularly played in casinos and involve some form of legal gambling, but they are also played privately under varying house rules. The term has significance in that some jurisdictions permit casinos to have only slots and no table games. In some states, this law has resulted in casinos employing electronic table games, such as roulette, blackjack, and craps.

Table games found in casinos include:

- Baccarat
- Blackjack
- Craps
- Roulette
- Poker (Texas hold'em, Five-card draw, Omaha hold'em)
- Big Six wheel

Electronic table games are versions of the above but played on a machine. This can be split into several categories. Stadium gaming are dealer-dealt games which are performed to a viewing audience akin to a stadium. Although the results come from the dealers, the player bets on terminals at their seat. Heads-up gaming involves players making decisions on their own machine with no interaction from other players. Multiplayer machines are where a player's decision may affect others at the same game, such as when to press the button to roll dice in craps. There are also hybrid games, as in craps, where the player bets on a terminal at the table but the game is managed by a dealer, although with fewer dealers than the non-hybrid version, this saves costs.

=== Gaming machines ===
Gaming machines found in casinos include:

- Pachinko
- Slot machine
- Video lottery terminal
- Video poker

=== Random numbers games ===
Random numbers games found in casinos include:

- Bingo
- Keno

== House advantage ==
Casino games typically provide a predictable long-term advantage to the casino, or "house", while offering the players the possibility of a short-term gain that in some cases can be large. Some casino games have a skill element, where the players' decisions have an impact on the results. Players possessing sufficient skills to eliminate the inherent long-term disadvantage (the house edge or vigorish) in a casino game are referred to as advantage players.

The players' disadvantage is a result of the casino not paying winning wagers according to the game's "true odds", which are the payouts that would be expected considering the odds of a wager either winning or losing. For example, if a game is played by wagering on the number that would result from the roll of one die, the true odds would be 6 times the amount wagered since there is a 1 in 6 chance of any single number appearing, assuming that the player gets the original amount wagered back. However, the casino may only pay 4 times the amount wagered for a winning wager.

The house edge, or vigorish, is defined as the casino profit expressed as a percentage of the player's original bet. (In games such as blackjack or Spanish 21, the final bet may be several times the original bet, if the player doubles and splits.)

In American roulette, there are two "zeroes" (0, 00) and 36 non-zero numbers (18 red and 18 black). This leads to a higher house edge compared to European roulette. The chances of a player, who bets 1 unit on red, winning are 18/38 and their chances of losing 1 unit are 20/38. The player's expected value is EV = (18/38 × 1) + (20/38 × (−1)) = 18/38 − 20/38 = −2/38 = −5.26%. Therefore, the house edge is 5.26%. After 10 spins, betting 1 unit per spin, the average house profit will be 10 × 1 × 5.26% = 0.53 units. European roulette wheels have only one "zero" and therefore the house advantage (ignoring the en prison rule) is equal to 1/37 = 2.7%.

The house edge of casino games varies greatly with the game, with some games having an edge as low as 0.3%. Keno can have house edges of up to 25%, slot machines having up to 15%.

The calculation of the roulette house edge is a trivial exercise; for other games, this is not usually the case. Combinatorial analysis and/or computer simulation is necessary to complete the task.

In games that have a skill element, such as blackjack or Spanish 21, the house edge is defined as the house advantage from optimal play (without the use of advanced techniques such as card counting), on the first hand of the shoe (the container that holds the cards). The set of optimal plays for all possible hands is known as "basic strategy" and is highly dependent on the specific rules and even the number of decks used.

Traditionally, the majority of casinos have refused to reveal the house edge information for their slots games, and due to the unknown number of symbols and weightings of the reels, in most cases, it is much more difficult to calculate the house edge than in other casino games. However, due to some online properties revealing this information and some independent research conducted by Michael Shackleford in the offline sector, this pattern is slowly changing.

In games where players are not competing against the house, such as poker, the casino usually earns money via a commission, known as a "rake".

=== Standard deviation ===
The luck factor in a casino game is quantified using standard deviations (SD). The standard deviation of a simple game like roulette can be calculated using the binomial distribution. In the binomial distribution, SD = $\sqrt{npq}$, where n = number of rounds played, p = probability of winning, and q = probability of losing. The binomial distribution assumes a result of 1 unit for a win, and 0 units for a loss, rather than −1 units for a loss, which doubles the range of possible outcomes. Furthermore, if we flat bet at 10 units per round instead of 1 unit, the range of possible outcomes increases 10 fold.

SD (roulette, even-money bet) = 2b $\sqrt{npq}$, where b = flat bet per round, n = number of rounds, p = 18/38, and q = 20/38.

For example, after 10 rounds at 1 unit per round, the standard deviation will be 2 × 1 × $\sqrt{10 * 18/38 * 20/38}$ = 3.16 units. After 10 rounds, the expected loss will be 10 × 1 × 5.26% = 0.53. As you can see, standard deviation is many times the magnitude of the expected loss.

The standard deviation for pai gow poker is the lowest out of all common casino games. Many casino games, particularly slot machines, have extremely high standard deviations. The bigger size of the potential payouts, the more the standard deviation may increase.

As the number of rounds increases, eventually, the expected loss will exceed the standard deviation, many times over. From the formula, we can see that the standard deviation is proportional to the square root of the number of rounds played, while the expected loss is proportional to the number of rounds played. As the number of rounds increases, the expected loss increases at a much faster rate. This is why it is impossible for a gambler to win in the long term. It is the high ratio of short-term standard deviation to expected loss that fools gamblers into thinking that they can win.

It is important for a casino to know both the house edge and variance for all of their games. The house edge tells them what kind of profit they will make as a percentage of turnover, and the variance tells them how much they need in the way of cash reserves. The mathematicians and computer programmers that do this kind of work are called gaming mathematicians and gaming analysts. Casinos do not have in-house expertise in this field, so they outsource their requirements to experts in the gaming analysis field.

== See also ==
- Gambler's fallacy
