= Shuffling =

Procedure used to randomize a deck of playing cards

Riffle shuffle

Shuffling is a technique used to randomize a deck of playing cards, introducing an element of chance into card games. Various shuffling methods exist, each with its own characteristics and potential for manipulation.

One of the simplest shuffling techniques is the overhand shuffle, where small packets of cards are transferred from one hand to the other. This method is easy to perform but can be manipulated to control the order of cards. Another common technique is the riffle shuffle, where the deck is split into two halves and interleaved. This method is more complex but minimizes the risk of exposing cards.

Other shuffling methods include the Hindu shuffle, commonly used in Asia, and the pile shuffle, where cards are dealt into piles and then stacked. The Mongean shuffle involves a specific sequence of transferring cards between hands, resulting in a predictable order. The faro shuffle, a controlled shuffle used by magicians, involves interweaving two halves of the deck and can restore the original order after several shuffles.

Shuffling can be simulated using algorithms like the Fisher–Yates shuffle, which generates a random permutation of cards. In online gambling, the randomness of shuffling is crucial, and many sites provide descriptions of their shuffling algorithms. Shuffling machines are also used in casinos to increase complexity and prevent predictions. Despite these advances, the mathematics of shuffling continue to be a subject of research, with ongoing debates about the number of shuffles required for true randomization.

== Techniques ==
=== Overhand ===
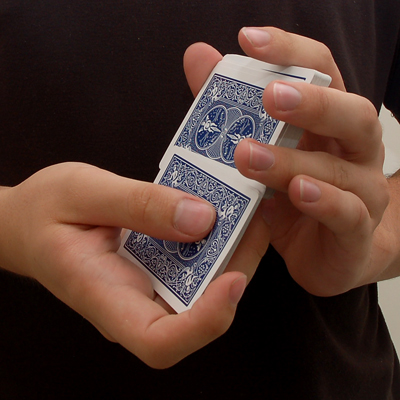
Overhand shuffle

One of the easiest shuffles to accomplish after a little practice is the overhand shuffle. Johan Jonasson wrote, "The overhand shuffle... is the shuffling technique where you gradually transfer the deck from, say, your right hand to your left hand by sliding off small packets from the top of the deck with your thumb." In detail as normally performed, with the pack initially held in the left hand (say), most of the cards are grasped as a group from the bottom of the pack between the thumb and fingers of the right hand and lifted clear of the small group that remains in the left hand. Small packets are then released from the right hand, a packet at a time, so that they drop on the top of the pack, accumulating in the left hand. The process is repeated several times. The randomness of the whole shuffle is increased by the number of small packets in each shuffle and the number of repeat shuffles performed.

The overhand shuffle offers sufficient opportunity for sleight of hand techniques to be used to affect the ordering of cards, creating a stacked deck. The most common way that players cheat with the overhand shuffle is by having a card at the top or bottom of the pack that they require, and then slipping it to the bottom at the start of a shuffle (if it was on top to start), or leaving it as the last card in a shuffle and just dropping it on top (if it was originally on the bottom of the deck).

=== Riffle ===
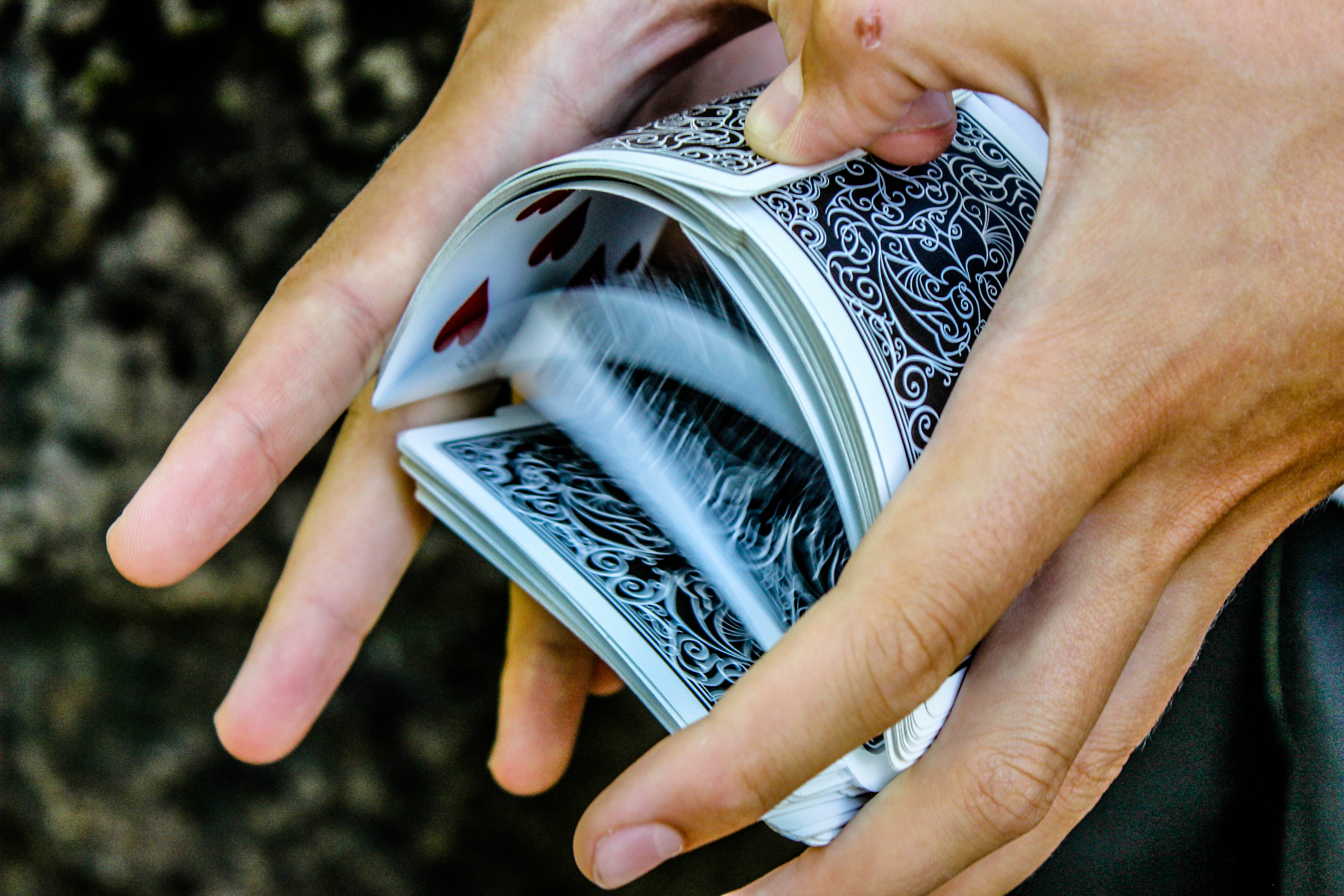
Cards lifted after a riffle shuffle, forming what is called a bridge which puts the cards back into place

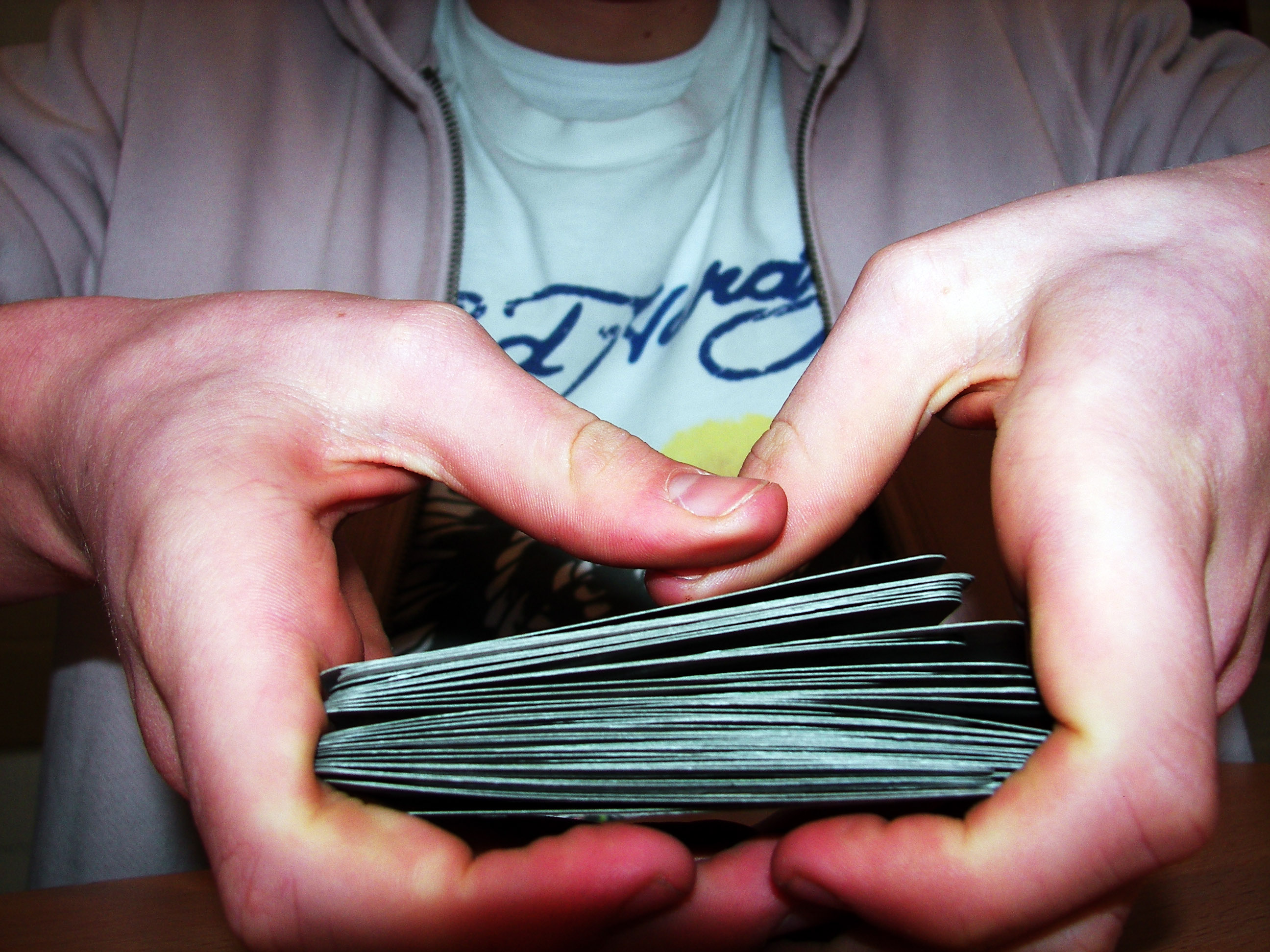
After a riffle shuffle, the cards cascade

A common shuffling technique is called the riffle, or dovetail shuffle or leafing the cards, in which half of the deck is held in each hand with the thumbs inward, then cards are released by the thumbs so that they fall to the table interleaved. Many also lift the cards up after a riffle, forming what is called a "bridge," which puts the cards back into place; it can also be done by placing the halves flat on the table with their rear corners touching, then lifting the back edges with the thumbs while pushing the halves together. While this method is more difficult, it is often used in casinos because it minimizes the risk of exposing cards during the shuffle. There are two types of perfect riffle shuffles: if the top card moves to be second from the top then it is an in shuffle, otherwise it is known as an out shuffle (which preserves both the top and bottom cards).

The Gilbert–Shannon–Reeds model provides a mathematical model of the random outcomes of riffling that has been shown experimentally to be a good fit to human shuffling and that forms the basis for a recommendation that card decks be riffled seven times in order to randomize them thoroughly. Later, mathematicians Lloyd M. Trefethen and Lloyd N. Trefethen authored a paper using a tweaked version of the Gilbert–Shannon–Reeds model showing that the minimum number of riffles for total randomization could also be six, if the method of defining randomness is changed.

=== Box ===
Also known as "strip." The deck is held from the top by one hand close to the top of the table, and a pile is stripped off the top of the deck with the other hand and placed on the table. Additional piles are stripped off and placed on top of the previous pile until all cards have been placed onto the new pile. Boxing the cards is functionally the same as an overhand shuffle, however, by keeping the cards close to the table, it is less likely that cards will be accidentally exposed.

=== Hindu ===
Also known as the "Indian", "Kattar", "Kenchi" (Hindi for scissor), or "Kutti Shuffle". The deck is held face down, with the middle finger on one long edge and the thumb on the other on the bottom half of the deck. The other hand draws off a packet from the top of the deck. This packet is allowed to drop into the palm. The maneuver is repeated over and over, with newly drawn packets dropping onto previous ones, until the deck is all in the second hand. Indian shuffle differs from stripping in that all the action is in the hand taking the cards, whereas in stripping, the action is performed by the hand with the original deck, giving the cards to the resulting pile. This is the most common shuffling technique in Asia and other parts of the world, while the overhand shuffle is primarily used in Western countries.

=== Pile ===
Cards are simply dealt out into a number of piles, then the piles are stacked on top of each other. Though this is deterministic and does not randomize the cards at all, it ensures that cards that were next to each other are now separated. Some variations on the pile shuffle attempt to make it slightly random by dealing to the piles in a random order each circuit. The pile shuffle is also known in Canada as the Chabot Shuffle.

=== 52 pickup ===
A person may throw a deck of cards into the air or across a surface, and then pick up the cards in random order, assembled with the cards facing the same direction. If specific cards are observed too closely as they are picked up, an additional 52 pickup or an additional shuffling method may be needed for sufficient randomization. This method is useful for beginners, but the shuffle requires a large clean surface for spreading out the cards, and it may take more time than is desired.

'A game of 52 pickup' is also the name of a child's prank, where one child asks a 'friend' if they want to play 52 pickup. They then throw the cards into the air, and demand the other child 'pick them up'.

=== Corgi ===
This method is similar to 52 pickup and also useful for beginners. Also known as the Chemmy, Irish, wash, scramble, hard shuffle, ice cream, smooshing, or washing the cards, this involves simply spreading the cards out face down, and sliding them around and over each other with one's hands. Then the cards are moved into one pile so that they begin to intertwine and are then arranged back into a stack. Statistically random shuffling is achieved after approximately one minute of smooshing.

=== Mongean ===
The Mongean shuffle, or Monge's shuffle, is performed as follows (by a right-handed person): Start with the unshuffled deck in the left hand and transfer the top card to the right. Then repeatedly take the top card from the left hand and transfer it to the right, putting the second card at the top of the new deck, the third at the bottom, the fourth at the top, the fifth at the bottom, etc. The result, if one started with cards numbered consecutively $\scriptstyle 1, 2, 3, 4, 5, 6, \dots, 2n$, would be a deck with the cards in the following order: $\scriptstyle 2n, 2n-2, 2n-4, \dots, 4, 2, 1, 3, \dots, 2n-3, 2n-1$. It is named after Gaspard Monge, who wrote about it in 1773.

=== Faro ===
Weaving is the procedure of pushing the ends of two halves of a deck against each other in such a way that they naturally intertwine. Sometimes the deck is split into equal halves of 26 cards which are then pushed together in a certain way so as to make them perfectly interweave. This is known as a Faro Shuffle.

The faro shuffle is performed by cutting the deck into two, preferably equal, packs in both hands as follows (right-handed): The cards are held from above in the right and from below in the left hand. Separation of the deck is done simply lifting up half the cards with the right hand thumb slightly and pushing the left hand's packet forward away from the right hand. The two packets are often crossed and tapped against each other to align them. They are then pushed together by the short sides and bent (either up or down). The cards then alternately fall into each other, much like a zipper. A flourish can be added by springing the packets together by applying pressure and bending them from above, as called the bridge finish. The faro is a controlled shuffle which does not randomize a deck when performed properly.

A perfect faro shuffle, where the cards are perfectly alternated, is considered one of the most difficult sleights by card magicians, simply because it requires the shuffler to be able to cut the deck into two equal packets and apply just the right amount of pressure when pushing the cards into each other. Performing eight perfect faro shuffles in a row restores the order of the deck to the original order only if there are 52 cards in the deck and if the original top and bottom cards remain in their positions (1st and 52nd) during the eight shuffles. If the top and bottom cards are weaved in during each shuffle, it takes 52 shuffles to return the deck back into original order (or 26 shuffles to reverse the order).

=== Mexican spiral ===
The Mexican spiral shuffle is performed by cyclic actions of moving the top card onto the table, then the new top card under the deck, the next onto the table, next under the deck, and so on until the last card is dealt onto the table. It takes quite a long time, compared with riffle or overhand shuffles, but allows other players to fully control cards which are on the table. The Mexican spiral shuffle was popular at the end of the 19th century in some areas of Mexico as a protection from gamblers and con men arriving from the United States.

=== Team shuffle ===
Especially useful for large decks, a shuffler may divide a deck into two or more smaller decks, and give the other portion(s) to (an)other shuffler(s), each to choose their own shuffling method(s). Smaller decks or portions of smaller decks may be traded around as shuffling continues, then the smaller decks are combined (and briefly shuffled) into the original large deck. This also prevents one shuffler from having unfair control of the randomization.

=== Cut ===
Typically performed after a previous shuffling method, the cut is of simply taking a deck, dividing it into two portions of random size, and putting the previously lower portion on top of the previously higher portion. This is occasionally performed by a second shuffler, for additional assurance of randomization, and to prevent either the shuffler or an observer from knowing the top or bottom card.

== Faking ==
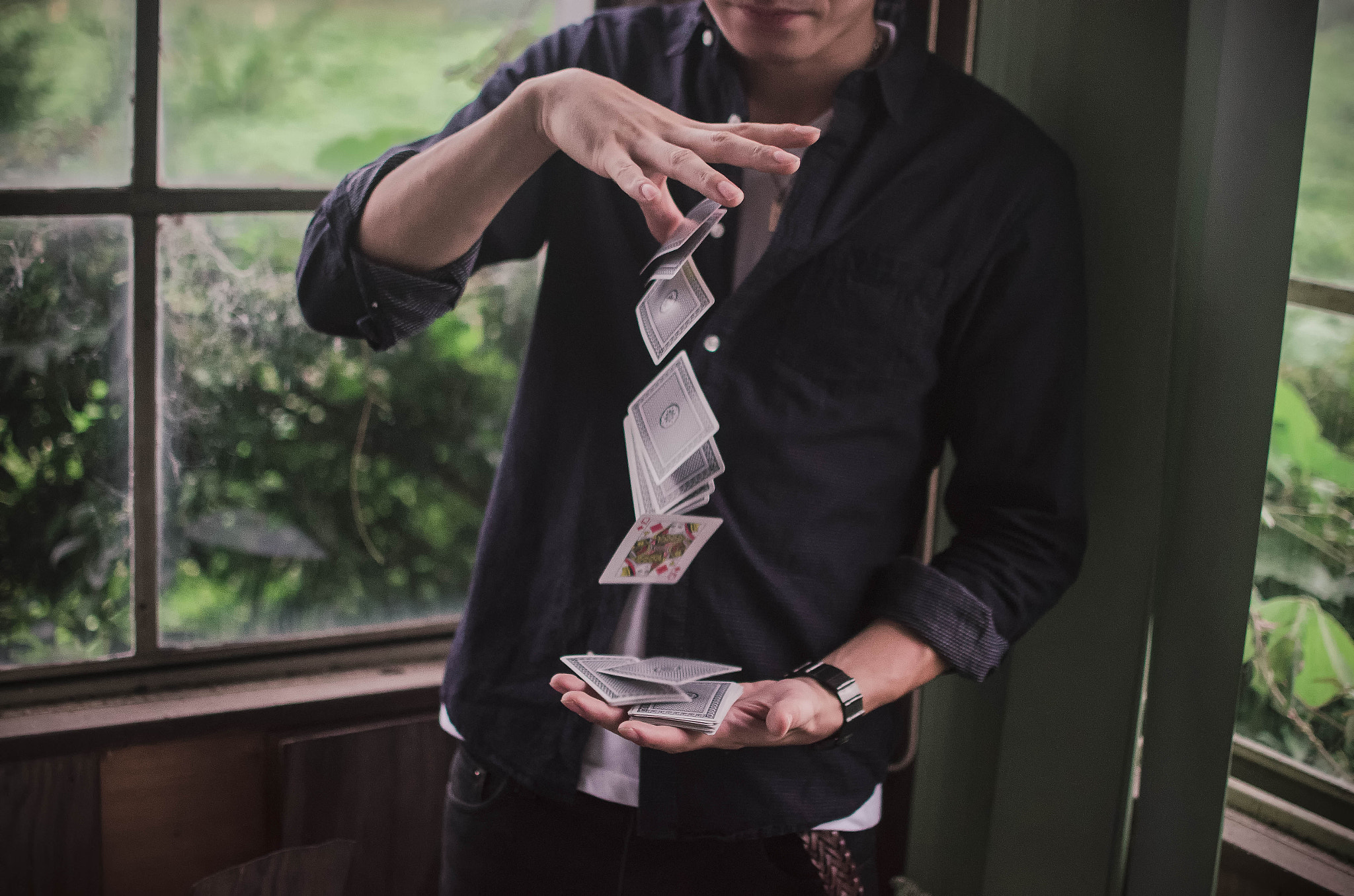
Shuffling trick

Magicians, sleight-of-hand artists, and card cheats employ various methods of shuffling whereby the deck appears to have been shuffled fairly, when in reality one or more cards (up to and including the entire deck) stays in the same position. It is also possible, though generally considered very difficult, to "stack the deck" (place cards into a desirable order) by means of one or more riffle shuffles; this is called "riffle stacking".

Both performance magicians and card sharps regard the Zarrow shuffle and the Push-Through-False-Shuffle as particularly effective examples of the false shuffle. In these shuffles, the entire deck remains in its original order, although spectators think they see an honest riffle shuffle.

== Machines ==
Casinos often equip their tables with shuffling machines instead of having croupiers shuffle the cards, as it gives the casino a few advantages, including an increased complexity to the shuffle and therefore an increased difficulty for players to make predictions, even if they are collaborating with croupiers. The shuffling machines are carefully designed to avoid biasing the shuffle and are typically computer-controlled. Shuffling machines also save time that would otherwise be wasted on manual shuffling, thereby increasing the profitability of the table. These machines are also used to lessen repetitive-motion-stress injuries to a dealer.

Players with superstitions often regard with suspicion any electronic equipment, so casinos sometimes still have the croupiers perform the shuffling at tables that typically attract those crowds (e.g., baccarat tables). Additionally, casinos replace their decks at regular intervals; even if a shuffling machine is being used, the croupier usually manually shuffles the replacement decks before placing them into the machine.

== Randomization ==
There are 52 factorial (expressed in shorthand as 52!) possible orderings of the cards in a 52-card deck. In other words, there are 52 × 51 × 50 × 49 × ··· × 4 × 3 × 2 × 1 possible combinations of card sequences. This is approximately 8.0658×10^{67} (80,658 vigintillion) possible orderings, or specifically 80,658,175,170,943,878,571,660,636,856,403,766,975,289,505,440,883,277,824,000,000,000,000. The magnitude of this number means that it is exceedingly improbable that two randomly selected, truly randomized decks will be the same. However, while the exact sequence of all cards in a randomized deck is unpredictable, it may be possible to make some probabilistic predictions about a deck that is not sufficiently randomized.

=== Sufficiency ===
The number of shuffles that are sufficient for a "good" level of randomness depends on the type of shuffle and the measure of "good enough randomness", which in turn depends on the game in question. For most games, four to seven riffle shuffles are sufficient; for unsuited games such as blackjack, four riffle shuffles are sufficient, while for suited games, seven riffle shuffles are necessary. There are some games, however, for which even seven riffle shuffles are insufficient.

In practice, the number of shuffles required depends both on the quality of the shuffle and how significant non-randomness is, particularly how good the people playing are at noticing and using non-randomness. Two to four shuffles is good enough for casual play. But in club play, good bridge players take advantage of non-randomness after four shuffles, and top blackjack players supposedly track aces through the deck; this is known as "ace tracking", or more generally, as "shuffle tracking".

=== Research ===
Following early research at Bell Labs, which was abandoned in 1955, the question of how many shuffles was required remained open until 1990, when it was convincingly solved as seven shuffles, as elaborated below. Some results preceded this, and refinements have continued since.

A leading figure in the mathematics of shuffling is mathematician and magician Persi Diaconis, who began studying the question around 1970, and has authored many papers in the 1980s, 1990s, and 2000s on the subject with numerous co-authors. Most famous is (Bayer & Diaconis 1992), co-authored with mathematician Dave Bayer, which analyzed the Gilbert–Shannon–Reeds model of random riffle shuffling and concluded that the deck did not start to become random until five good riffle shuffles, and was truly random after seven, in the precise sense of variation distance described in Markov chain mixing time; of course, you would need more shuffles if your shuffling technique is poor. Recently, the work of Trefethen et al. has questioned some of Diaconis' results, concluding that six shuffles are enough. The difference hinges on how each measured the randomness of the deck. Diaconis used a very sensitive test of randomness, and therefore needed to shuffle more. Even more sensitive measures exist, and the question of what measure is best for specific card games is still open. Diaconis released a response indicating that you only need four shuffles for un-suited games such as blackjack.

On the other hand, variation distance may be too forgiving a measure, and seven riffle shuffles may be many too few. For example, seven shuffles of a new deck leave an 81% probability of winning New Age Solitaire where the probability is 50% with a uniform random deck. One sensitive test for randomness uses a standard deck without the jokers divided into suits with two suits in ascending order from ace to king, and the other two suits in reverse. (Many decks already come ordered this way when new.) After shuffling, the measure of randomness is the number of rising sequences that are left in each suit.

== Algorithms ==
If a computer has access to purely random numbers, it is capable of generating a "perfect shuffle", a random permutation of the cards; beware that this terminology (an algorithm that perfectly randomizes the deck) differs from "a perfectly executed single shuffle", notably a perfectly interleaving faro shuffle. The Fisher–Yates shuffle, popularized by Donald Knuth, is simple (a few lines of code) and efficient (O(n) on an n-card deck, assuming constant time for fundamental steps) algorithm for doing this. Shuffling can be seen as the opposite of sorting.

There are other, less-desirable algorithms in common use. For example, one can assign a random number to each card, and then sort the cards in order of their random numbers. This will generate a random permutation, unless any of the random numbers generated are the same as any others (i.e., pairs, triplets, etc.). This can be eliminated either by adjusting one of the pair's values randomly up or down by a small amount or reduced to an arbitrarily low probability by choosing a sufficiently wide range of random number choices. If using efficient sorting such as mergesort or heapsort this is an O(n log n) average and worst-case algorithm.

=== Online gambling ===
These issues are of considerable commercial importance in online gambling, where the randomness of the shuffling of packs of simulated cards for online card games is crucial. For this reason, many online gambling sites provide descriptions of their shuffling algorithms and the sources of randomness used to drive these algorithms, with some gambling sites also providing auditors' reports of the performance of their systems.

== See also ==
- Card manipulation
- List of card manipulation techniques
- Mental poker
- Cheating at poker
- Solitaire (cipher)
