= Silicon Gaming =

American Technology company

Silicon Gaming Inc.
- Type: Subsidiary
- Industry: Gaming
- Founded: 1993
- Founders: Robert M. Fell, Dave Morse, Allan Alcorn
- Fate: Merged with International Game Technology
- Products: slot machines, Gaming technology
- Parent: International Game Technology (1975) (2001–2015); GTECH/International Gaming Technology PLC (2015–present)

Silicon Gaming Inc. was an American gaming company founded in 1993 by a group of multimedia entertainment executives and technology specialists such as Robert M. Fell and Allan Alcorn with funding from angel investor Dave Morse. Silicon Gaming Inc. focused on applying various video gaming and computer technology to wagering products such as slot machines.

Silicon Gaming Inc. was the first video gaming company to create a video-based slot machine game. It supplied video-based slot machines to various hotels in the United States such as Bally's Las Vegas, Caesars Palace, Hard Rock Hotel & Casino, MGM Grand Las Vegas, and Palace Station among many others.

== History ==
Silicon Gaming Inc. was founded in 1993 with the initial idea of applying multimedia and computer technology to slot machines to increase periods of play and win per machine for casino operators. Engineers at Silicon Gaming Inc., including Allan Alcorn who served as the Senior VP and Chief Technical Officer, developed significant gaming security and authentication patents frequently dubbed the "Alcorn Patents" during their time at the company.

In 1994, Andrew Pascal, the founder and chairman of PlayStudios, was hired as the Director of Slot Operations and Marketing. He was later named as the CEO of the company. In July 1996, Silicon Gaming Inc. went public.

In December 2000, Silicon Gaming Inc. announced a definitive announcement to merge with International Game Technology (IGT). In March 2001, Silicon Gaming Inc. completed its merger with International Game Technology under the same name, International Game Technology (IGT). In 2015, IGT was acquired by GTECH S.p.A., which itself was acquired by Lottomatica S.p.A., an Italian gambling company. The resulting company subsequently changed its company name to International Gaming Technology PLC (IGT).
