= Andrew Pascal =

American businessman

- Born: November 3, 1965 (age 61); Miami, Florida, U.S.
- Education: University of Colorado, Boulder (BA)
- Occupation: Businessman
- Spouse: Trina Pascal (m. 1995)
- Children: 2
- Mother: Mary Ann Pascal (step-mother)
- Relatives: Steve Wynn (uncle); Elaine Wynn (aunt)

Andrew Scott Pascal (born November 3, 1965) is an American businessman. He is the founder, CEO, and chairman of Playstudios, a consumer gaming company focused on the free-to-play social and mobile games. He was previously the president and chief operating officer of Wynn Las Vegas, president and CEO of WagerWorks, and its predecessor Silicon Gaming.

== Early life ==
Andrew Pascal was born on November 3, 1965, in Miami to Michael and Susan Pascal. He earned a Bachelor of Arts in economics from the University of Colorado, Boulder. He is the nephew of casino developers Steve and Elaine Wynn.

== Career ==
=== Golden Nugget Las Vegas ===
Pascal started his career in the 1980s as a manager of slot machines at the Golden Nugget Las Vegas, then owned by his aunt and uncle, Steve and Elaine Wynn.

=== Silicon Gaming and WagerWorks ===
After moving to San Francisco, Pascal became the chief executive officer of Silicon Gaming, focusing on innovative slot machine technology. He later established WagerWorks in 2001, providing online gaming solutions. Both companies were eventually acquired by International Game Technology (IGT).

=== Wynn Resorts ===
Pascal joined Wynn Resorts in 2003 as Senior Vice President of Product Marketing and Development. He was later promoted to President and Chief Operating Officer of Wynn Las Vegas in 2005, overseeing the development and opening of Encore Las Vegas in 2008. Pascal resigned from the company in late 2010.

=== Playstudios ===
In 2011, Pascal co-founded Playstudios, a company specializing in free-to-play social and mobile casino games. As chairman and CEO, he led the development of the company's first game, myVEGAS Slots, launched on Facebook in 2012. The company has received investments from MGM Resorts International and Activision Blizzard. In February 2021, it was announced that PLAYSTUDIOS would go public via SPAC (Special-Purpose Acquisition Company) and listed on the Nasdaq under the ticker symbol MYPS. The transaction valued the company at $1.1 billion. In November 2021, the company acquired the license to Tetris mobile.

=== Alon Las Vegas ===
In 2014, Pascal partnered with Australian billionaire James Packer's Crown Resorts to develop Alon Las Vegas, a proposed $2.4 billion resort on the Las Vegas Strip. In August 2014, Crown Resorts majority-owned subsidiary Alon Las Vegas LLC acquired 34.6 acres on the northern end of the Las Vegas Strip for $280 million, where the New Frontier Hotel and Casino once stood, with the hopes of opening in late 2018. However, the project was discontinued in 2016 after Crown Resorts withdrew its investment, reportedly due to having trouble raising investment money for development, and sold the 34.6 acre property to Wynn Resorts in January 2018.

=== Bear's Best Las Vegas ===
In 2024, Pascal, along with partner Mike Mixer, acquired Bear's Best Las Vegas golf course in Summerlin for $30.5 million through their company, Mulligan Holdings LLC. The duo plans to invest $300 million to transform the course into a private club with 15 villas, aiming to reopen in October 2026.

== Personal life ==
In 1995 he married Pascal Trina in San Francisco. They have two children.

In 2004, Pascal's family moved to Las Vegas for his position at Wynn Resorts. Las Vegas remains his primary residence, where he has been involved in the hospitality and gambling industries.
