= Boss Media =

Defunct Swedish online gambling company

- Industry: Entertainment; Gambling
- Founded: 1996
- Defunct: 2008
- Fate: Bought/rebranded
- Successor: GTECH Gaming
- Headquarters: Växjö, Sweden

Boss Media AB, with its main headquarters in Växjö, Sweden, was a developer of software and systems for digitally distributed gambling entertainment. Boss Media was publicly traded on the Stockholm Stock Exchange from 1999 to 2008, when GEMed bought the company and rebranded it to GTECH Gaming.

== History ==
Boss Media was founded in 1996, with the initial corporate aim to operate Gold Club Casino, which it launched in 1997. Soon after the online casino was launched, Boss Media launched Casino.com as a casino news portal and the company started receiving requests from investors and companies interested in purchasing Boss Media's casino software as a white label. Boss Media's main focus thereby transferred to the creation of complete white label Internet casino solutions for clients and began to sell licenses at around 300,000 US dollars plus a revenue share.

During the years following, Boss Media was a dominant player in the global online casino software market alongside Microgaming, CryptoLogic and later Playtech amongst others.

During the boom in US online gambling prior to its US ban in 2004, Boss Media was supporting some 32 or more licensees with its software.

Boss Media's corporate focus later shifted to the creation of customised e-gaming systems for several gaming corporations. Boss Media sold its Internet casino in February 2004 to focus entirely on the e-gaming solutions it develops for clients. Boss Media then provided e-gaming solutions for online casino operators including bwin and Sportingbet.

== International Poker Network ==
Boss Media AB, in partnership with St Minver Ltd of Gibraltar, managed the International Poker Network, the platform for over 35 poker rooms.

In May 2007, the International Poker Network partnered with Yahoo! UK in launching Yahoo! Poker.

== Dynamite Idea ==
Boss Media acquired Dynamite Idea of England in April 2008. Dynamite Idea was founded in 1995, at that time specialising in graphic and web design, but became a developer of fixed odds and skill-based betting games, interactive television and fixed odds betting terminal games.

== Post-acquisition (GTECH G2, SPIELO G2 and IGT) ==
Following the 2008 acquisition, Boss Media was rebranded as GTECH G2, the interactive division of GTECH Corporation, itself a subsidiary of the Italian lottery operator Lottomatica (which had acquired GTECH in 2006). In July 2013, GTECH G2 was rebranded as SPIELO G2 as part of an internal consolidation that merged the unit with Spielo International, another Lottomatica subsidiary that had absorbed the Atronic gaming group.

In April 2015, GTECH plc completed its acquisition of International Game Technology (IGT), with the combined group adopting the IGT name; the former Boss Media business was absorbed into IGT's interactive operations. The platform that began as Boss Media's online casino software has continued to power online casino, poker, bingo and lottery operators through these successive corporate ownerships.
