= Mary Ann Pascal =

American actress and business executive (born 1958)

- Born: February 4, 1958 (age 68); New York City, U.S.
- Years active: 1984–1996
- Spouse: Michael Pascal (m. 1978; died 2022)
- Children: Andrew Pascal (stepson)
- Relatives: Elaine Wynn (sister-in-law)

Mary Ann Pascal (born February 4, 1958) is an American actress and business executive. She is known for her role as Samantha "Sam" Booke (later Waters) on the Showtime original comedy series Brothers, and as the vice president of player development at Wynn Las Vegas.

== Career ==
Pascal was born in New York City, spending her upbringing both there and in Florida.

She broke into television in 1984, at first in guest roles on such series as Mickey Spillane's Mike Hammer and Hotel, and in a few made-for-TV movies before landing what is perhaps her best known role to date on Showtime's Brothers, in 1986. For the next three seasons of Brothers, Pascal played Sam, the new steady love interest of Joe Waters (Robert Walden), whom he eventually marries at the start of the show's fifth season. Sam became pregnant just before their wedding, and bore Joe a daughter, Caroline, during the season.

Outside of and beyond Brothers, Pascal continued to do guest work on syndicated, network and cable TV series, while adding more TV movies to her resume. Her most visible roles in TV films include Blood Vows: The Story of a Mafia Wife (1987), Parker Kane (1990) and Writer's Block (1991). Pascal's last guest appearance was in a 1996 episode of USA Network's Pacific Blue (a series from Brothers producer Gary Nardino).

She is sometimes billed as Marianne or Mariann, but is most commonly referred to as Mary Ann. Prior to officially joining the cast of Brothers, Pascal made guest appearances in the program's first and second seasons as different characters.

In the mid-1980s, Pascal began working as unofficial hostess of the Golden Nugget Hotel and Casino in Las Vegas. She regularly commuted back and forth between Las Vegas and Los Angeles for work. During her time on Brothers, the show made several references to the Golden Nugget in storylines that involved the Sam character. A multi-episode story arc in the fourth season was partially shot on location at the Golden Nugget when most of the cast (including Pascal) went to Las Vegas. Then, at the end of the show's fifth-season premiere, when Joe and Sam decide to return to Las Vegas for their wedding, Sam asks Joe if they'll have a "Golden Nugget nuptial".

Pascal continued her career with Las Vegas resorts after leaving on-screen acting in 1996, eventually becoming the vice president of player development at Wynn Las Vegas.

== Personal life ==
Pascal was married to Michael Pascal until his death in 2022. He was a former executive host for the Golden Nugget Hotel and Casino whose sister, Elaine Wynn, was formerly married to billionaire Steve Wynn. Mary Ann has two stepsons, Andrew Pascal and David Pascal.
