= Elaine Wynn =

American billionaire businesswoman and philanthropist (1942–2025)

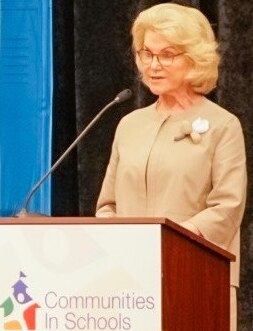
- Wynn in 2019
- Born: Elaine Farrell Pascal; April 28, 1942; New York City, U.S.
- Died: April 14, 2025 (aged 82); Los Angeles, California, U.S.
- Education: George Washington University (BA)
- Occupation: Businesswoman
- Board member of: Communities in Schools (national and local chapter), UNLV Foundation, Consortium for Policy Research in Education, Los Angeles County Museum of Art (2015)
- Spouse: Steve Wynn (m. 1963; div. 1986) (m. 1991; div. 2010)
- Children: 2
- Relatives: Andrew Pascal (nephew)

Elaine Farrell Wynn (née Pascal; April 28, 1942 – April 14, 2025) was an American billionaire businesswoman, art collector, philanthropist and education reformer. She co-founded Mirage Resorts and Wynn Resorts with her former husband, Steve Wynn.

Wynn was on the Nevada State Board of Education from 2012 until 2020 and was the board's president in 2015 and 2017. She was on the national board of Communities in Schools from 1999 until her death in 2025.

== Early life and education ==
Wynn was born to a middle-class Jewish family on April 28, 1942, in New York City. Her father was a salesman for resort hotel packages and her mother was a homemaker. She spent part of her early life in Miami Beach, Florida.

She attended George Washington University and majored in political science. While in college, she went on a blind date with Steve Wynn, who had just graduated from the University of Pennsylvania. At the end of her junior year, the couple got married. She graduated from George Washington University with a Bachelor of Arts degree in 1964.

== Business career ==
Wynn co-founded the Mirage Resorts with her former husband in 1976. They also co-founded Wynn Resorts in 2000. She was on its board of directors. She played a pivotal role in the resurgence and expansion of the Las Vegas Strip with her former husband. In 2015, she nominated herself to the board, but she was not confirmed.

Wynn was the company's largest shareholder, with a 9% stake valued in May 2018 at nearly $2 billion. In 2018, after revelations of Steve Wynn's reported sexual harassment of multiple Wynn employees, and payments to cover up those allegations that were kept secret from the board of directors, he sold his 12% share of the company and agreed to return voting rights to Elaine Wynn (which she had signed away during their 2010 divorce agreement).

In June 2018, Wynn successfully led a shareholder proxy campaign to remove John Hagenbuch from the board, due to his conflict of interest created by ties to the company's former CEO.

At the time of her death in April 2025, Wynn still owned nearly 9% of stock at Wynn Resorts. However, as a result of recent purchases, most of the stock at Wynn Resorts was now owned by Houston-based investor Tilman Fertitta.

== Community involvement ==
=== Education ===
She was on the board of trustees of the Elaine P. Wynn & Family Foundation, which focuses on education and community development initiatives. From 1983 to 2008, she was involved with the UNLV Foundation, and its chair from 1985 to 1991, which conducts fundraising for the University of Nevada, Las Vegas. She also was on the executive board of the Consortium for Policy Research in Education.

Wynn co-founded the Nevada affiliate of Communities In Schools (CIS) in 1993 to provide integrated student support services to at-risk youth. She joined the national board in 1999 and was chair from 2007 to 2024.

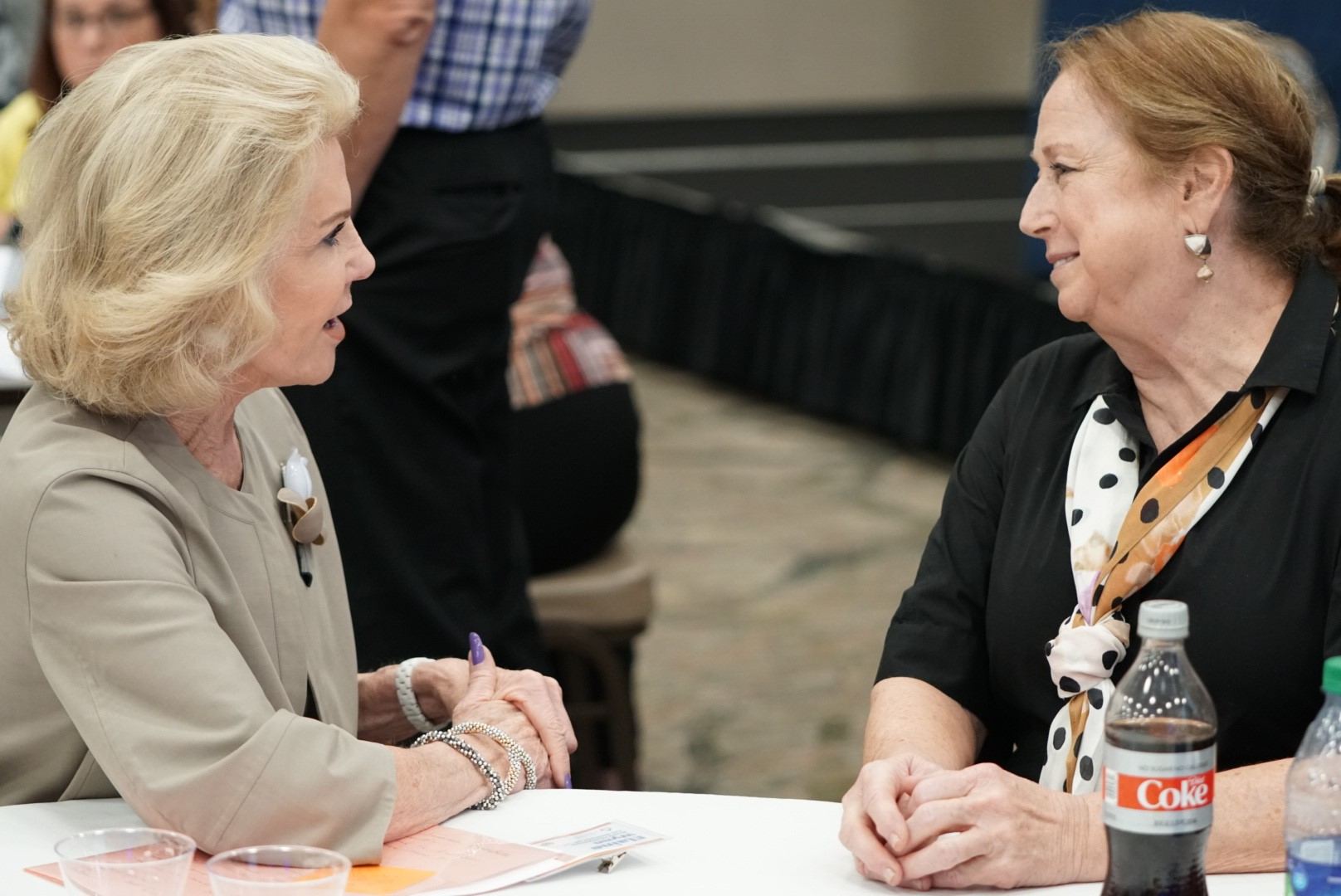
Wynn and First Lady of West Virginia Cathy Justice at a Communities In Schools reception in 2019

In 2011, she co-chaired the state government initiative, the Nevada Blue Ribbon Education Reform Task Force, which produced a report titled Nevada’s Promise. The report recommended various improvements to the state's public education system, among them:

- Establish a "Teachers and Leaders Council" to develop a fair and transparent evaluation system based on student growth and professional practice.
- Utilize real-time data to inform instruction and policy decisions to tailor instruction to meet students’ needs.
- Integrate support services within schools to address issues such as health, nutrition, and family support, enabling educators to focus on teaching.
- Create an accountability system that measures student progress and school performance. It stressed the need for transparent reporting.
- Revise the funding formula to more equitably distribute funds across schools and districts.

Wynn was appointed to the Nevada State Board of Education by Governor Brian Sandoval. During her tenure on the board, she was elected as its president and oversaw and helped approve the hiring of three Nevada Superintendents of Public Instruction.

=== The arts ===
Wynn was appointed to the board of trustees of the Kennedy Center for the Performing Arts by President Barack Obama in 2011.

She was the co-chair of the Los Angeles County Museum of Art. In 2016, she provided a $50 million donation for the museum's $650 million expansion. She also helped fund the installation of Michael Heizer's Levitated Mass on the museum's campus.

In 2024, Wynn and the mayor of Las Vegas, Carolyn Goodman, announced plans for the Las Vegas Museum of Art, which has a projected opening date of 2028. The planned museum will operate as a partnership with the Los Angeles County Museum of Art, which will allow it to share its collections and programming; the partnership was to be co-chaired by Wynn.

== Personal life and death ==
Wynn married businessman Steve Wynn in 1963. They divorced in 1986, remarried in 1991 and divorced again in 2010. Wynn resided in the couple's mansion inside Southern Highlands Golf Club.

They had two daughters, Kevyn and Gillian. Kevyn was kidnapped in 1993 and Wynn paid $1.45 million in ransom for her return. The kidnappers were apprehended when one attempted to buy a Ferrari in Newport Beach, California, with cash. Kevyn was found unharmed several hours later.

Wynn was an avid art collector. In 2013, she acquired Francis Bacon's Three Studies of Lucian Freud for $142.4 million and loaned it to the Portland Art Museum. Her bid was the highest price ever paid at auction for a work of art at the time.

Wynn died at her home in Los Angeles from heart failure, on April 14, 2025, at the age of 82.
