= Allan Alcorn =

American computer scientist (born 1948)

- Alcorn in 2011
- Born: January 1, 1948 (age 78); San Francisco, California
- Education: University of California, Berkeley (B.S., EECS, 1971)
- Occupation: Engineer
- Known for: Creating one of the first video games: Pong

Allan Edwin Alcorn (born January 1, 1948) is an American computer scientist and video game designer. He is best known for creating Pong, one of the first video games. In 2009, he was chosen by IGN as one of the top 100 game creators of all time.

== Atari and Pong ==
Pong, the video game Alcorn designed

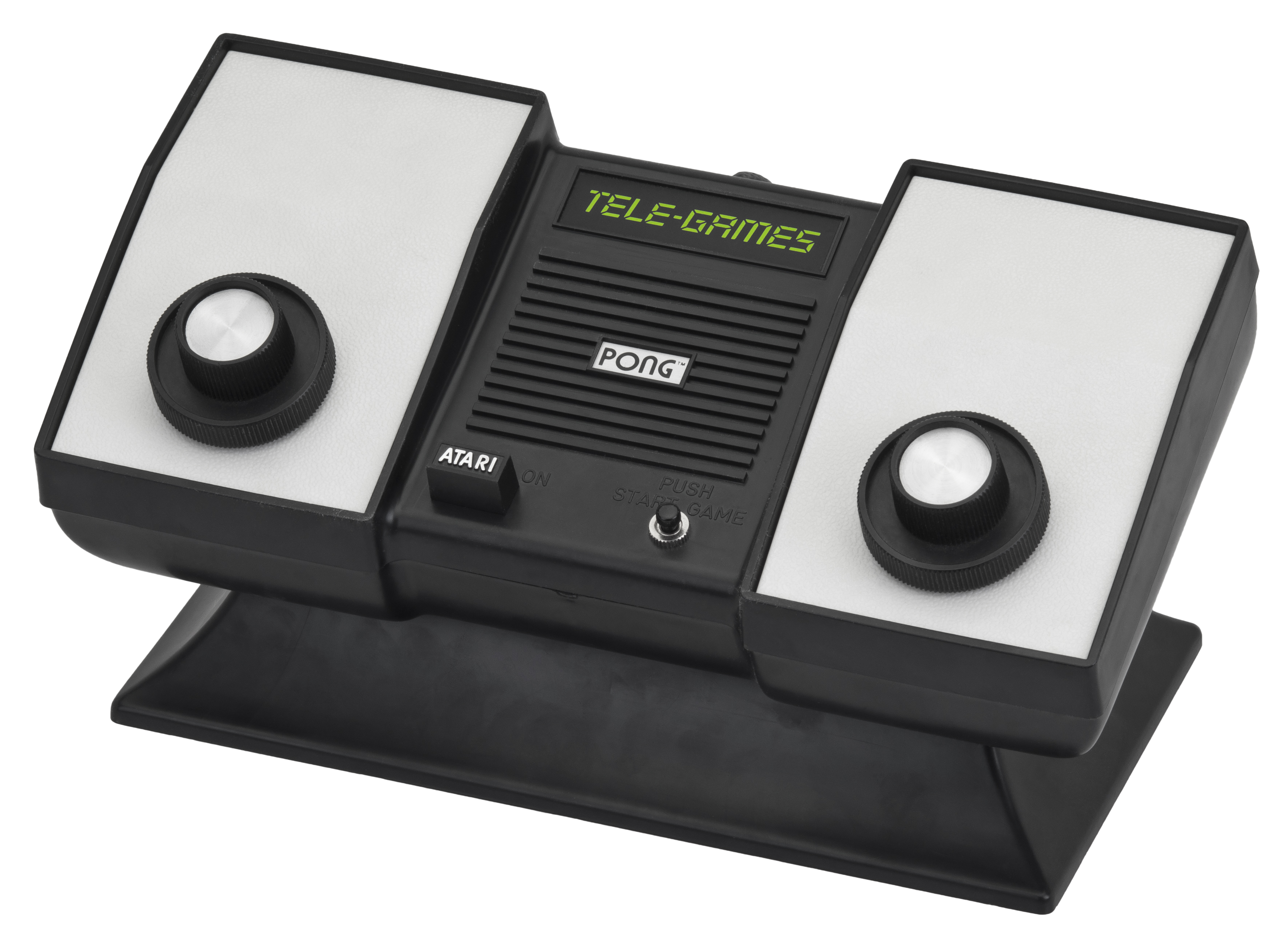
Pong consoles and clones were common in the mid-1970s.

Alcorn grew up in San Francisco, California, and attended the University of California, Berkeley, graduating with a Bachelor of Science degree in electrical engineering and computer sciences in 1971.

He worked for the pioneering video company Ampex, where he met Ted Dabney and several other people that would end up being constants through the Atari, Inc., Apple, Cyan Engineering and Pizza Time Theater (now known as Chuck E. Cheese's) companies.

Alcorn was the designer of the video arcade game Pong, creating it under the direction of Nolan Bushnell and Dabney. Pong was a hit in the 1970s.

In addition to direct involvement with all the breakout Atari products, such as the Atari 2600, Alcorn was involved at some of the historic meetings of Steve Wozniak and Steve Jobs (at that time an Atari employee) presenting their Apple I prototype.

Alcorn was the person who hired Steve Jobs when he applied for a job at Atari in 1974. Jobs had seen a help-wanted ad in the San Jose Mercury newspaper for Atari that said "Have fun, make money." He showed up in the lobby of the video game manufacturer wearing sandals and disheveled hair, and told the personnel director that he wouldn't leave until he was given a job.

Al Alcorn, then chief engineer at Atari, was called and told, "We've got a hippie kid in the lobby. He says he's not going to leave until we hire him. Should we call the cops or let him in?" Alcorn said to send him in. Despite Jobs's startling appearance, Alcorn hired him. As Alcorn described it, "He just walked in the door and here was an eighteen-year-old kind-of a hippy kid, and he wanted a job, and I said 'Oh, where did you go to school?' and he says 'Reed,' 'Reed, is that an engineering school?' 'No, it's a literary school,' and he'd dropped out. But then he started in with this enthusiasm for technology, and he had a spark. He was eighteen years old so he had to be cheap. And so I hired him!"

Atari co-founder Nolan Bushnell noted that Jobs was "brilliant, curious, and aggressive," but soon it was apparent that Jobs could also be very difficult to work with, openly mocking other employees and making several enemies in the process. To make matters worse, he had significant body odor. Jobs adhered to a fruitarian diet, and believed (incorrectly) that it prevented body odor, so he did not shower regularly or use deodorant. Unfazed by the complaints, Alcorn resolved the problem by having Jobs work only at night.

== Alcorn's work on Cosmos leaving Atari ==
When Ray Kassar replaced Bushnell as president, Atari became a marketing company. The old leadership took risks and pioneered new technologies. Instead of developing new technologies, Kassar preferred to push existing ideas to their fullest. Alcorn wanted to begin work on the next generation of home video-game hardware, but Kassar didn't even want to consider an alternative to the Atari VCS.

Toward the end of 1978, Alcorn assembled a team of engineers and began designing a game console called Cosmos. Unlike the VCS, Cosmos did not plug into a television set. It had a light-emitting diode display. Both systems played games stored on cartridges, but Cosmos's tiny cartridges had no electronics, simply a four-by-five inch mylar transparency that cost so little to manufacture that the entire cartridges could retail for $10.

Alcorn's team included two new engineers. Harry Jenkins, who had just graduated from Stanford University, and Roger Hector, a project designer who had done some impressive work in the coin-op division. Both were assigned to work directly under Alcorn on the Project.

Borrowing a page from Odyssey, the Cosmos used overlays to improve the look of its games. Cosmos's overlays, however, were among the most impressive technologies ever created by Atari engineers.

Atari negotiated a deal with a bank for access to patents belonging to Holosonics, a bankrupt corporation that controlled most of the world's patents for holograms- a technology for creating three-dimensional images using lasers. Alcorn brought in two specialists, Steve McGrew and Ken Haynes, to develop a process for mass-producing holograms that could be used with his game.

McGrew developed a process for creating holograms on mylar. In later years, Haynes expanded the technology for other uses, such as placing 3D pictures on credit cards. Alcorn used their mylar technology to create an impressive array of 3D holographic overlays for the Cosmos. One of the first games developed for the system was similar to Steve Russell's Spacewar- an outer-space dogfight in which two small ships battled. The game took place in empty space with no obstructions, but the holographic overlay created an extremely elaborate backdrop with whirling 3D asteroids. The overlay did not affect the game. The ships could not interact with the backdrop, but the visual effects were spectacular.

Before beginning the project, Alcorn asked Ray Kassar for permission to create a new stand-alone game system. According to Alcorn, Kassar seemed uninterested but did not object. By the middle of 1980, Alcorn and his team had completed a working prototype. When they showed it to marketing, they were told that the department had no interest in selling anything other than the VCS.

Alcorn, Jenkins, and Hector had invested too much time in Cosmos to abandon it. Other engineers advised them to simply walk away from the project, but Alcorn decided to market the unit himself. He asked for space to show Cosmos at Atari's booth during the 1980 Winter Consumer Electronics Show in the Las Vegas Convention Center. Amazingly, the marketing department said yes.

By this time, Mattel and Bally had entered the market with newer, more powerful consoles, but no one seemed to care. The VCS had more games and a much larger installed base. A constant stream of buyers from toy stores and department stores flowed through the Atari booth. While they were there, several buyers stopped by the Cosmos table, where Alcorn, Hector, and Jenkins demonstrated the console themselves. The holographic overlays attracted a lot of attention.

A few months later, Alcorn, Hector, and Jenkins manned a similar display at the Toy Fair in New York City. Having learned from his failure to sell Home Pong on the floor of the show, Alcorn also set up a suite for private meetings. Among the visitors to the booth was Al Nilsen, the new toy buyer for J. C. Penney.

Although the response to Cosmos was not even remotely close to the VCS, several buyers decided to gamble on the system. Alcorn returned to California from the Toy Fair with orders for 250,000 units. When he told Kassar that he wanted to begin manufacturings, Kassar derailed his plans. Despite the impressive number of orders, Kassar did not want to manufacture a game system that would compete with the VCS. Cosmos was never manufactured.

Alcorn and Hector long claimed that Kassar refused to manufacture the Cosmos because it represented competition for the VCS, but some of the people who tried the game console disagree. There were questions about the play value of its games. Kassar's decision to mothball Cosmos infuriated Alcorn, and he left the company. He hoped to receive the same retirement benefits that Bushnell, Williams, and Keenan were enjoying. According to Alcorn, being put "on the beach" by Manny Gerard meant receiving an expense account, a monthly check, and a company car.

Alcorn's plans, however, nearly did not come to pass. According to Warner Communications, Alcorn was not entitled to the same retirement package as Bushnell and Keenan. Warner attorneys claimed that Alcorn had negotiated his severance separated from the other board members and that he was not entitled to the same bonus-pool compensation.

By this time, Atari controlled 75 percent of the lucrative home video-game market and VCS sales were nearing $2 billion per year. The percent of a bonus pool that Bushnell and Keenan received represented a substantial income. The case went to court. Warner settled and Alcorn, Atari's first full-time engineer, retired "to the beach."

== After Atari ==
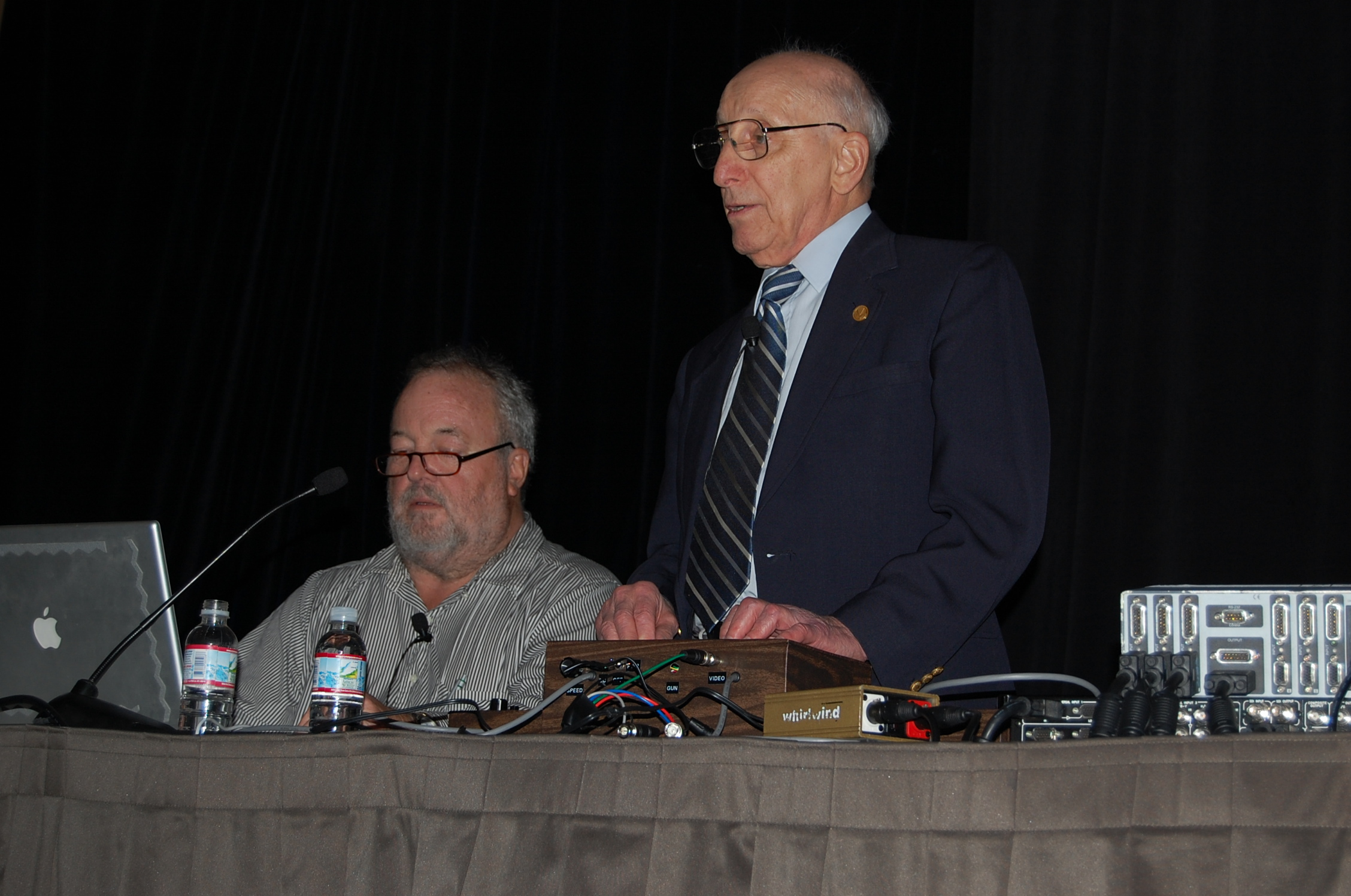
Allan Alcorn with Ralph Baer at GDC 2008

After Atari sold to Warner Communications in 1976, Alcorn was being paid not to show up for work. When Alcorn left Atari in 1981, he began consulting for many fledgling companies in Silicon Valley. He was especially involved in the startups of Catalyst Technologies, one of the first technology company incubators, created by Nolan Bushnell and other ex-Atari leaders.

Alcorn was involved in several of the startups directly, including Cumma, a re-programmable video game cartridge/kiosk system (and precursor to the similar Neo Geo system), and an advisor to Etak, one of the first practical, in-car navigation systems.

Alcorn later became an Apple Fellow, and also led and consulted with a variety of startups during the tech boom.

In 1993, Alcorn co-founded Silicon Gaming, which focused on applying various video gaming and computer technology to wagering products such as slot machines. In 1998, Alcorn co-founded Zowie Intertainment, a spinoff from Interval Research. There he developed a child's playset with a location system that allowed a PC to respond to the child's play. In 2000, Zowie Entertainment was acquired by Lego.

Alcorn for a period of time in the 90s and early 2000s was erroneously called a "co-founder" of Atari in video game media. Ted Dabney, one of the Atari co-founders, corrected this, saying Alcorn was very important to the early development of Atari and was one of their first employees, but wasn't a co-founder of the company.

Alcorn was portrayed by David Denman in the 2013 biographical drama Jobs.
