= Atari Cosmos =

Unreleased handheld console

- Developer: Atari, Inc.
- Type: Handheld/tabletop electronic game
- Released: Unreleased (1978–1981)
- Media: Cartridge
- CPU: COPS444L

The Atari Cosmos was an unreleased product by Atari, Inc. for the handheld/tabletop electronic game system market that uses holography to improve the display. It is similar to other small electronic games of the era that used a simple LED-based display, but superimposes a two-layer holographic image over the LEDs for effect. Two small lights illuminate one or both of the holographic images depending on the game state. The system was never released, and is now a coveted collector's item.

== History ==
The Cosmos was created by Atari, Inc. engineers Allan Alcorn, Harry Jenkins and Roger Hector. Work on the Cosmos began in 1978. Atari, Inc. purchased most of the rights to holographic items so that they could make this system. The Cosmos was to have nine released games, but all of the game logic for those games was included in the Cosmos itself – the cartridges only contained the holographic images and a notch to identify which game was included. This technically made the Cosmos a dedicated console, but Atari, Inc. did not publicize this fact.

In advertisements made for the system before its cancellation, Atari Inc. claimed that the holographic images were life-like and 3D. While this may have been true, the images did not influence the actual gameplay at all. There were only two images to a game, though they did enhance each game's appearance. The system was intended to be powered by an AC adapter rather than batteries. The Cosmos would have supported up to two players.

In 1981, the Cosmos was exhibited at the 1981 New York Toy Fair. Reviewers were extremely critical of the system, but Atari, Inc. stood by it and managed to obtain 8,000 pre-orders at the show alone. Engineering logs indicate that a 250-unit run was to be made, but it is unclear if they were all produced. In interviews by Curt Vendel with Al Alcorn and Steve Providence, management removed all of the parts and components from the "Holoptics Lab"; they are speculated to have been destroyed. Shortly thereafter, Ray Kassar directed Al Alcorn to close down the Holoptics labs and remove all of the holographic photography equipment and associated machinery.

== Games ==
- Asteroids
- Basketball
- Dodge 'Em
- Football
- Outlaw
- Road Runner
- Sea Battle
- Space Invaders
- Superman

== Specifications ==
- CPU: National Semiconductor COPS444L
- Graphic modes: Holographic backgrounds and programmable LEDs
- Lighting: 2 dual non-reflective incandescent lights for "A" and "B" Holoptic scenes
- Power supply: 10.5 V AC, 750 mA
