= GTECH Corporation =

Gambling technology company

GTECH Corp.
- Type: Subsidiary
- Industry: Lotteries and Online gambling
- Founded: 1980; 46 years ago
- Founder: Guy Snowden & Victor Markowicz & Robert K. Stern
- Headquarters: Providence, Rhode Island, U.S.
- Area served: Worldwide
- Key people: Jaymin Patel (CEO)
- Products: Slot machines, Video Lottery Terminals, Scratchcards, Lottery Software, Online poker software, Online payment systems
- Parent: International Game Technology
- Website: www.igt.com

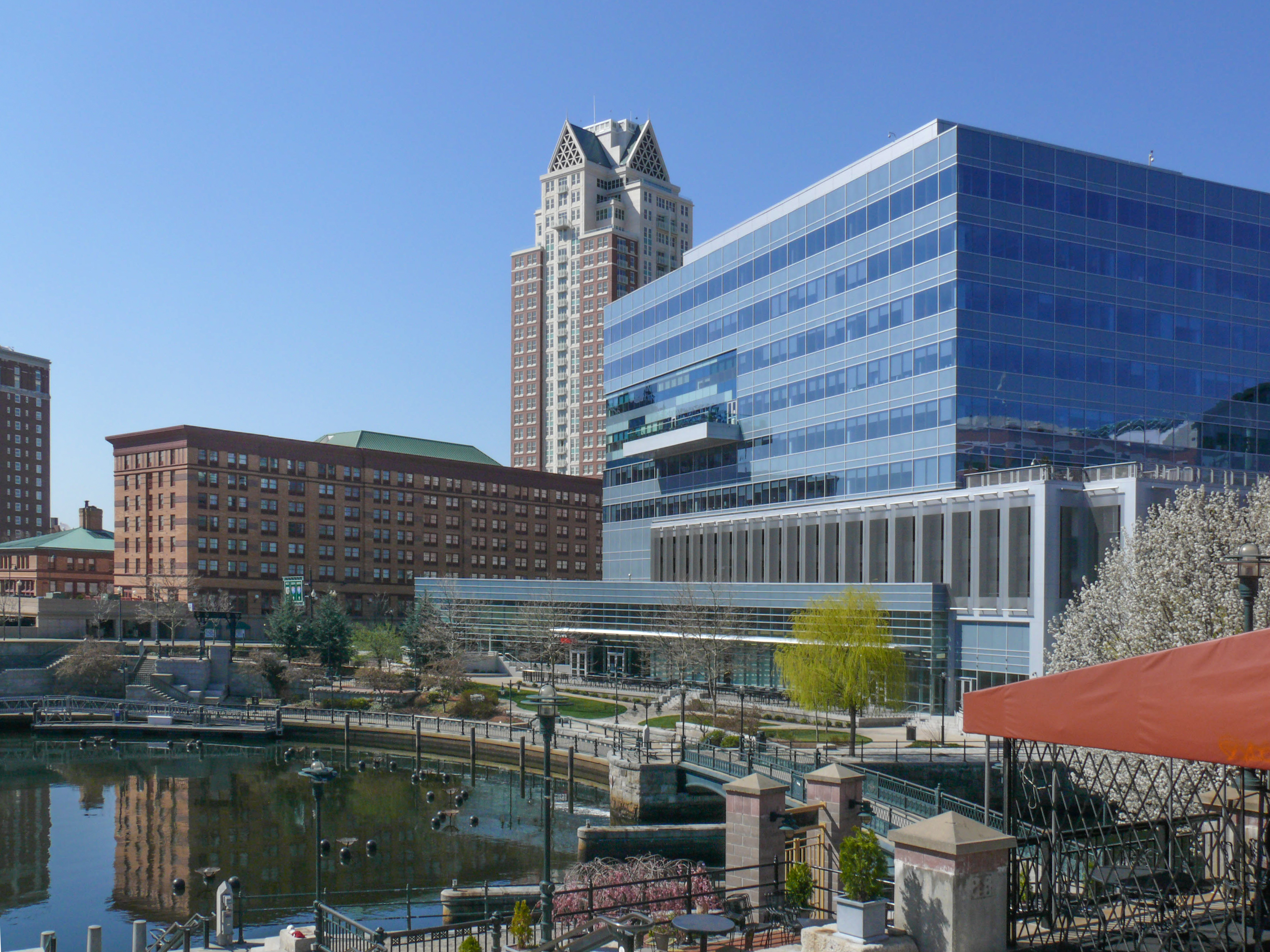
GTECH's world headquarters, (left), in Providence, Rhode Island

GTech Corporation was a gambling technology company based in Providence, Rhode Island, United States. It was acquired in 2006 for $4.5 billion by Lottomatica of Italy, which later rebranded as GTECH in the U.S. GTECH subsequently acquired International Game Technology (1975–2015) (IGT) in 2015, adopting International Game Technology (IGT) as its business name. Lottomatica also retained its brand from Italy, and operates several other subsidiaries.

== History ==
GTech was founded by Guy S. Snowden, Victor Markowicz and Robert Stern in 1981. The company was financed with $200,000 from the founders and an equal amount invested by the Bass Brothers, to whom Snowden had close ties, with their long-time advisor Richard Rainwater. The outside investors also arranged a bank guarantee of $3 million for the fledgling company, and saw the original $200,000 investment grow to $40 million within 15 years of GTech's launch. In that same year, 1996, an extensive investigation by Fortune magazine revealed that few companies have "faced as many allegations of baldly sleazy conduct as Gtech."

In 1998, GTech founder Snowden, then chairman, lost a defamation suit brought by Richard Branson concerning Snowden's attempt to bribe him to withdraw The People's Lottery from bidding on the operation contract for the UK's National Lottery. Subsequently, Snowden was forced to resign from GTech and as a shareholder in the Camelot Group. In 2000, GTECH reported that it had won 80% of all online lottery contracts worldwide since 1996, and held about 70% of the global market in online gaming.

In 2005, GTech was operating 26 of the 36 U.S. state lotteries, and the D.C. Lottery. A year later, it was acquired by Italian gaming operator Lottomatica for $6.4 billion, then operated as its U.S. subsidiary. Five years later, in 2011, Lottomatica reported revenues of €3 billion, with 8,000 employees in more than 60 countries.

In 2007, The New York Times reported "persistent allegations of bribing their way into contracts" from government regulators and court filings.

Lottomatica changed its U.S. subsidiary name to GTECH, in 2013, stylizing it with all capital letters.

In 2015, GTECH, formerly GTech, merged with International Game Technology (1975–2015) (IGT), while agreeing "to pay a fine of over $40 million to the Italian authorities to settle intercompany financing activities and alleged tax evasion that occurred during a previous merger in 2006, between Gtech and its buyer, Italy-based Lottomatica", which continues operating under the Lottomatica brand, with several subsidiaries, and is listed on Euronext Milan of Borsa Italiana. The company rebranded again, adopting International Game Technology (IGT) as its new name.

== Lottery frauds and controversies ==
=== British National Lottery and Branson lawsuit, 1994–1998 ===
Richard Branson prevailed in court in a defamation lawsuit against GTECH cofounder Snowden, whom he claimed had offered him a bribe to withdraw "The People's Lottery" 1994 non-profit bid to run the UK's first franchise for the National Lottery, in which GTECH won an integral role through Camelot Group. Snowden denied the bribery claim and was met by Branson's suit, which succeeded in 1998.

During the National Lottery's 2000 franchise bidding process, GTECH software was revealed to have caused winners to be paid incorrect amounts. The National Lottery Commission recommended that the People's Lottery be awarded the lottery franchise. GTECH then sold its Camelot Group shares to its other stakeholders so that Camelot could remain viable in the bidding. Camelot positioned GTECH back into the National Lottery as a supplier, again securing the lottery operations contract.

=== New Jersey state lottery fraud, 1996 ===
Subsequent to grand jury investigations in four U.S. states of GTECH officials and associates; working under cofounder and CEO Guy Snowden, in October 1996, GTech national sales manager J. David Smith was convicted by New Jersey court on federal charges of fraud, bribery, conspiracy, and money laundering in connection with the New Jersey Lottery. Smith was sentenced to five years in prison.

=== Texas Lottery scandals, 1992-2015 ===
State audits and subsequent lawsuit depositions illustrate Gtech's checkered history with the Texas Lottery, including that of its chief lobbyist in the state in 1997, Ben Barnes, a former Texas lieutenant governor. Under fire, Barnes resigned from the $25,000-a-month lobbying contract, with he and his partner receiving a $26 million golden parachute contract buy-out from GTech.

Texas Lottery's first director, Nora Linares, was fired in 1997 when the Commission became aware of her personal relationship with a GTech consultant, whom she later married. She was replaced by Lawrence Littwin in June 1997.

After Texas Lottery disqualified GTech, in 1999, from operating its state lottery due to strong evidence of corruption, the then-new Governor of Texas, George W. Bush, fired the lottery director who promoted competitive bidding for the lottery contract. Appointed by Bush, the subsequent lottery commissioner returned the multi-billion-dollar contract to GTech without any bidding process. Littwin's and Barnes' testimonies implicated GTech.
