= Everi Holdings =

American slot machine company

Everi Holdings Inc.
- Formerly: Global Cash Access Holdings, Inc.
- Type: Public
- Traded as: NYSE: EVRI; Russell 2000 Component
- Industry: Financial services, gaming
- Founded: 1998; 28 years ago
- Founders: Three payment processing companies and Kirk Sanford
- Fate: Merged with IGT (2026)
- Headquarters: Spring Valley, Nevada, United States
- Products: Slot machines, automated teller machines
- Revenue: $808 million (2023)
- Operating income: $179 million (2023)
- Net income: $84 million (2023)
- Owner: Apollo Global Management
- Number of employees: 2,200 (2023)
- Website: everi.com

Everi Holdings Inc., formerly Global Cash Access Holdings, Inc., was a company based in Spring Valley, Nevada that produced slot machines and provided financial equipment and services to casinos.

== History ==
Global Cash Access was founded in July 1998 as a joint venture of three payment processing companies: BA Merchant Services (majority-owned by Bank of America), First Data, and USA Processing Inc. First Data contributed the assets of its gaming business, First Data Financial Services, which provided cash services at over 800 gaming properties; it had purchased the business earlier in the year from Ceridian Corporation. BA Merchant Services contributed $35 million in cash, plus its existing gaming assets, for a 21 percent stake in the business.

The company underwent a recapitalization in March 2004, repurchasing First Data's shares for $435 million, leaving M&C International with a 95% share of the company, with Bank of America owning the rest. Two months later, M&C sold a large portion of the company to a group of private equity firms led by Summit Partners for $316 million.

GCA completed its initial public offering in September 2005, raising $240 million and listing on the New York Stock Exchange, with Kirk Sanford as president and chief executive officer at the time.

In 2009, gaming regulators recommended denying renewal of the company's license to do business in Arizona casinos, because of allegations that Global Cash Access had defrauded banks out of $26 million in transaction fees between 1999 and 2002, by miscoding Visa cash advance transactions as retail purchases. In response, co-founders Karim Maskatiya and Robert Cucinotta, who had been sharply criticized by the regulators, sold their 26 percent interest in the company, and GCA ultimately paid $1 million to Arizona to settle the investigation.

Global Cash Access expanded into the slot machine business by purchasing Texas-based slot maker Multimedia Games for $1.2 billion in December 2014. The company changed its name to Everi Holdings in August 2015, to reflect its broader business model.

In 2022, Everi acquired Ecash Holdings (a provider of financial services for the gaming industry) for $24 million; Intuicode Gaming, a developer of historical horse racing systems, for $25 million; and mobile technology and e-commerce platform, Venuetize Inc.

In 2024, Everi agreed to merge with the gaming and betting divisions of International Game Technology (IGT); the combined company would be valued at $6.4 billion and would retain the IGT name.

In July 2025, Apollo Global Management announced that it had completed the purchase of Everi and certain assets of IGT. Additionally, it was reported that a new venture will be formed by integrating the operations of the acquired companies.
