= Brothers (1984 TV series) =

American sitcom

- Brothers opening title sequence
- Genre: Sitcom
- Created by: David Lloyd
- Starring: Robert Walden; Paul Regina; Brandon Maggart; Philip Charles MacKenzie; Robin Riker; Hallie Todd; Mary Ann Pascal; Yeardley Smith; Tommy Hinkley
- Theme music composer: Marcus Barone; Joe Diamond; Gloria Nissenson
- Composers: Dan Foliart; Howard Pearl
- Country of origin: United States
- Original language: English
- No. of seasons: 5
- No. of episodes: 115

Production
- Executive producers: Greg Antonacci; Gary Nardino
- Producers: Marie Connolly; Katherine Green; Stephen Neigher; Shelley Jensen; Nick LeRose; Rick Newberger; Stu Silver; Don Van Atta; Joel Zwick
- Running time: 22–24 minutes
- Production companies: Gary Nardino Productions; Paramount Video (1984–86) (seasons 1-3); Paramount Television (1987–1989) (seasons 4-5)

Original release
- Network: Showtime
- Release: July 13, 1984 – May 5, 1989

Brothers is an American sitcom that originally aired on the cable network Showtime from July 13, 1984, to May 5, 1989, totaling 115 episodes. It was produced by Gary Nardino Productions, in association with two separate divisions of Paramount Pictures: first by Paramount Video (1984–86) and by Paramount Television (1987–89). The show focuses on the three Waters brothers.

== History ==
=== Development ===
David Lloyd, Greg Antonacci and Gary Nardino respectively created and developed Brothers in 1982, with the same format as what made it to the air. Lloyd, a veteran TV writer known for his work on The Mary Tyler Moore Show, Taxi and the then-new NBC sitcom Cheers, had the premise for this series suggested to him by his employers, TV producers Ed. Weinberger and Stan Daniels. Wishing to develop a new screenplay with a revolutionary theme, Lloyd took to Weinberger and Daniels' idea about exploring familial relationships with the presence of a major—and controversial—life change, that of a relative finally coming out and addressing his homosexuality. Lloyd fully developed the idea and assumed full credit for the creation of the project. He then partnered himself with then-Paramount Television president Nardino, who was looking to form an independent production company (he would leave Paramount in July 1983 to form Gary Nardino Productions), and Antonacci, a young actor-turned-director and producer, to write a pilot script with a modern, relevant point of view. The relationship of three adult brothers, inseparable and living in a world strongly underscored by masculinity, who soon have to confront the youngest brother's decision to be openly gay, quickly came to fruition in the screenplay aptly titled Brothers.

The project was originally shopped around to broadcast networks NBC and ABC, in hopes of being picked up for the 1983 fall television season. NBC agreed to screen the pilot due to Lloyd's work on Taxi and Cheers (both of which had aired on NBC during the 1982–1983 season), and due to the insistence of Weinberger and Daniels. Network executives (then headed by Brandon Tartikoff) saw the charm of the content, but were concerned about how homosexuality was going to be portrayed. NBC did put Brothers in the running of fall 1983 pilots, but ultimately passed on it, instead choosing a series from Weinberger, Mr. Smith, in its place. Lloyd, Antonacci and Nardino then offered Brothers to ABC, who instantly shot it down due to it dealing with gay themes. The creative team refused to give up hope on the project, and the same was said for its three leads, who from the beginning were Robert Walden (fresh off his Emmy Award-nominated role of Joe Rossi on CBS' Lou Grant), Paul Regina and Brandon Maggart. As the producers tried to find a new outlet to pitch it to, development was put on hold, allowing Regina to co-star in CBS' short-lived Zorro and Son (1983), and Maggart to assume a role on NBC's Jennifer Slept Here (1983–1984).

Eventually, Lloyd and company were approached by Showtime, who at the time had successfully begun to venture into the new field of original pay-cable TV series. In 1983, the channel had been the first in history to revive a canceled network series for original cable broadcasts, with The Paper Chase (which originally ran on CBS in 1978–1979). Showtime's mission was to produce and pick up original programming that was outside the boundaries of standard network TV fare, and saw Brothers perfectly fitting that mold. Both parties struck a deal that had its cast paid at the same rate as network stars, with a full out 26-episode order from the start. Fortunately, Lloyd didn't have to scramble around to recast two of his stars, since Regina and Maggart both saw their series get canceled, so his original choices were back in place. With the series' premiere in the summer of 1984, Showtime now boasted one more first — the first original situation comedy on cable TV.

Said Robert Walden of his experience working on Showtime, "There are fewer cooks in the kitchen, and the writers have more freedom. There's also something to be said for playing to 5 million or 6 million viewers instead of 30 million. You're reaching a higher common denominator." Since Nielsen Media Research had not yet adapted its ratings system to measure audience levels on premium cable, Showtime relied on qualitative research rather than sheer statistical reports. "We have research firms that do telephone interviews with our subscribers," explained Peter Chernin, a Showtime programming executive. "They call people and ask them how much they like particular shows. We also take into account the opinions of our local affiliates. All of them rated Brothers very highly."

Unlike the policies set at rival HBO, who had no intention of preparing any of their first forays into original series for syndication, Showtime had the market in mind as soon as they picked up Brothers. Since Brothers had such a successful first season by pay-cable standards, channel execs announced two unprecedented moves in the spring of 1985: not only would Brothers have a renewal for 50 more episodes, but the series would begin airing episodes simultaneously in broadcast syndication that November. Showtime giving the series such a large vote of confidence with two-season renewal was so history-making that never had a broadcast network given a series such an expansive episode order after its freshman year.

HBO criticized their competitor's decision over the early syndication airing of Brothers, stating that they would never engage in such a practice with any of their original series. They felt it would destroy subscription rates and revenue if the public could watch one of their series for free on a local broadcast station, rather than pay monthly to view it on HBO. Showtime later recanted their 1985 syndication rollout for Brothers, and then fought back by saying that their subscribers had a five-year head start on all their shows, which were all prepped for syndication and of which would enter it after those five years. Their defense also included the facts that the parent studios of their shows would continue to receive royalties from strong rerun performance in syndication, and that the latter market would attract higher-profile writers and directors to ensure a more quality production. The alternative, as Showtime put it, would be not prepping series for syndication and thus taking a gamble on a relatively unknown or untested creative team.

As premium cable found its way with successful original programming, HBO would follow suit in what Showtime realized all along concerning syndication, and both would find that concurrent airings of cable series on broadcast TV wasn't so risky. In 1988, Showtime made history once again when they struck a deal with the young Fox Broadcasting Company to begin airing their Brothers stablemate, the smash hit It's Garry Shandling's Show, on Sunday nights in order to raise Fox's profile among the broadcast networks. Not only did It's Garry Shandling's Show fulfill its mission for Fox, but it actually increased interest in Showtime, and subscription rates benefited.

== Synopsis ==
Set in south Philadelphia, Brothers centered on the lives and relationships of the Waters brothers; oldest brother Lou (Brandon Maggart), a somewhat uncouth, but well-meaning construction foreman; middle brother Joe (Robert Walden), a retired placekicker for the Philadelphia Eagles and owner of a sports bar called The Point After; and the youngest brother, Cliff (Paul Regina), a sports journalism major and later, an aspiring chef.

In the premiere episode, Cliff shocks his family when he runs away from the altar on his wedding day. Instead of getting married, Cliff reveals to his family that he is gay. The pilot and following episodes centered on the efforts of Joe and Lou coming to terms with Cliff's long-held secret of his true sexual orientation, with both coping in their own unique way. Joe, who was definitely more sensible and open-minded, didn't see Cliff's sudden declaration of homosexuality robbing any aspect of their relationship. Lou assured his baby brother "Cliffie" that he loved and respected him but was convinced early on that what Cliff was feeling was just a phase and came up with numerous efforts to "cure" him of being gay. Cliff's relationship with the both of them was part brotherly, but also that of fathers and son, since Lou and Joe had almost 20 years on Cliff (their mother died when Cliff was an infant, followed a few years later by their dad; Lou and Joe raised Cliff for the majority of his youth). He was very much independent minded and kidded around with his brothers in the usual way siblings do, but at times looked to them for guidance and was very much overprotected by Lou and Joe.

Cliff, earnest, bright and very much determined to lead a fulfilled life now that he truly found himself, took many a stand on same-sex issues and discussions; throughout the first season, whenever a situation or argument ensued regarding his decisions in life, Cliff gave heartfelt statements on how proud and secure he was being his true self, and that nothing anyone could do could possibly change his inner desires. When the series began, he was still in college, majoring in sports journalism, while working part-time for Joe at The Point After. Following Cliff's first failed attempt at marriage, he resumed splitting rent with Joe in his sleek uptown apartment.

Philip Charles MacKenzie played Cliff's out-and-proud new friend Donald Maltby, a successful writer/magazine editor whom Cliff sought out friendship with for advice and support in the time leading up to his coming out. During and after the fact, Donald continued to be Cliff's voice of reason as he learned to navigate his way around the LGBT world. It was an otherwise unlikely friendship, but Donald's fey, queen-like behavior versus the masculinity of Cliff never got in the way, surprisingly. Donald's womanly flamboyance always unnerved Lou, and caused some mild, but humorous friction between them. However, Donald always managed to get the last laugh on Lou with his sharp humor. He lived in a cozy loft apartment which was another common setting for the stories. Cliff and Donald sometimes frequented The Velvet Spike, a local gay club/bar.

Other characters included Joe's teenage daughter Penny (Hallie Todd), who was becoming independent at a faster rate than Joe anticipated; and The Point After waitress, Kelly Hall (Robin Riker), who traded zingers with them all while acting as a mediator between the Waters brothers when necessary. Seen in sporadic guest appearances all through the series was Lou's long-time wife Flo (Carol Locatell), who only showed up whenever she and Lou were having some sort of marriage dispute. These were usually worked out within the space of a single episode, but their "hot and cold" behavior became one of the show's key running gags. Lou and Flo had three kids—Bucky, Flo Jr. and Louella—who were originally all referred to and never seen. Bucky, however, would make the first of two guest appearances beginning in the second season, as played by John Putch. A seminary student, Bucky went on sabbatical from the ministry and paid his family a visit in the season two episode "Father, Father", and appeared again in the fourth season Thanksgiving episode, unexpectedly dropping into town to surprise everyone.

=== Themes and evolution ===
Originally, the storylines on Brothers were permeated with exclusively gay themes, as Cliff and Donald's dating exploits were featured, along with the heterosexual characters' involvement in such stories. This sprung forth the show's knack for providing a blurred line of differences between the mating habits and culture of both sexualities. Examples of topical gay stories included Cliff's casual intimate encounters with men and the points he still wanted to learn; Lou and Donald's efforts to infiltrate crooked local police officers who refused to help Cliff, when he was attacked by two homophobic men; Donald's coaching Joe into accurately convincing a former teammate that he was gay, in order to form a closer bond with the recently outed teammate; and in the second season, when Cliff landed a boyfriend in well-to-do Winston March III (guest star John Furey), who helped him become even more comfortable in his identity. Winston initiated a passionate kiss with him, at a function he hosted, in front of Cliff's entire family.

Stereotypes of both sexualities, both positive and negative, were for the most part avoided, and if they appeared, were not emphasized at the expense of comedy so they would not detract from the meaningful, character-driven dialogue. While a steep gay slant in the stories was present, they were not depicted only from the gay point of view; all characters' points of view in stories which explored sexuality shared the spotlight from episode to episode, sometimes shifting back and forth within a single episode. The series, as a result, was recognized as being clever and complex in this regard.

However, after the first two seasons, the writers started to downplay the wall-to-wall gay stories in favor of ones that were neutral to homosexual/heterosexual overtones. Just as this took place, additional characters started entering their own long-term relationships, which were depicted in a more standard sitcom fashion without sexuality being the key topic in an episode. Also, with Brothers being a Showtime original series, the allowance of strong language was taken advantage of heavily during the first and second seasons. By season three, with Paramount Television serious about the show's future in reruns, the scripts were cleaned up as well over the concern that the constant editing of coarse dialogue (Joe's habitual exclaiming of "son of a bitch" and "fuck" and "shit" peppered in accordingly) would be bad for syndication and revenues.

=== Later seasons ===
At the start of the third season, Joe began dating a voluptuous beauty named Sam (Mary Ann Pascal), a very materialistic real estate agent who was not only content with the physical aspect of their relationship, but also out to reap the benefits of an ex-pro athlete's bank account. During their mating dance, Sam became another regular patron at The Point After, where at times she found herself in competition with Kelly over practically everything. Penny, who had rapidly matured from a gentle, innocent high school senior to a wild, vivacious party girl with a punk hairdo, began working as a dancer at Girls, Girls, Girls & Beer, a local dance hall, during her sophomore year in college. Everyone else on the scene had mates that came and went, and Joe was no exception with Sam, as they were on-again, off-again for a while; while Sam chose not to play the field, Joe dated others. In the fourth-season premiere, perky, cultured Ann Marie Wagner (guest star Judith-Marie Bergan) showed up, as a girlfriend of Joe's who had been with him for six months. Joe and Annie decided to get married during the course of the episode, but after much meddling from a jealous Sam, and a discouraging ceremony speech from Donald (who presided over the restaurant ceremony), the two called it off. A few episodes later, Joe went into overdrive dating both Annie and Sam, but felt guilty; when he went to break the news to Annie that he had been playing her, she revealed that she had been cheating too, so the two parted ways mutually, leaving Sam, who encouraged an open relationship, as Joe's only romantic focus.

In time, Joe and Sam discovered that they had a whole lot more in common beyond money and status, and love blossomed. Kelly and Sam even learned to put their feuding aside, forming sort of a "girls' club" together with Penny and Donald. Meanwhile, Cliff, who graduated from college early in the fourth season, was on the verge on launching his journalism career with a local newspaper when he had an epiphany-–that he suddenly had the affinity for cooking—and announced to everyone that he was enrolling in culinary school. Joe, Lou, and especially Donald tried to save him for turning down the offer to work at the paper, but in the end, decided to throw caution to the wind after tasting Cliff's impressive tomato sauce. Later that year, after dating many young men on the fast track, aspiring yuppie Penny fell for none other than Jim Grant (Tommy Hinkley), a construction worker from Lou's company. Jim was actually from a very wealthy family, but loved the laborer's life better, resulting in his turning down the opportunity to helm his family's million-dollar enterprise in order to be truly happy. Their romance lasted a single season. It was also at this time that the youngest of Lou's kids, athletic teenage prodigy Louella (Yeardley Smith), became a regular.

The fourth-season finale saw The Point After get upgraded to a three-star establishment by a local Philadelphia food publication, and Joe quickly received an offer by another top restaurateur for a huge buyout of his place. During the celebration of the three-star news at Donald's, everyone was shocked at the offer given to Joe, and Kelly expressed her worry over losing her job. After a series of flashbacks chronicling memorable moments the cast had at The Point After, Joe ripped up the papers granting its sale, and it was assumed as the episode came to an end that the gang would remain intact. However, as the fifth season began in June 1988, Kelly was no longer around (Robin Riker-Hasley had left the series). At this time, Sam, whom Joe had still been going steady with, revealed she was pregnant. Joe didn't take the news too well at first, since new fatherhood wasn't exactly in his game plan. Sam was dead set against abortion, and ended up giving Joe an ultimatum — either he opened up his mind to having a new family, or she left him to raise the child alone. Joe chose to stand by Sam, and the two rushed off to Las Vegas to tie the knot. Through the next few months he had many adjustments to make, but when their daughter, whom they named Caroline, was born in the December 2, 1988 episode, Joe was more than ready to embrace her. Lou, Cliff and Penny all shared the designation of being Caroline's guardian, in case anything ever happened to her parents. Baby Caroline (who was named after executive producer Gary Nardino's daughter) was played in her birth episode by boy and girl twins Charles and Cathryn Hacker, but for the remainder of the series, was played by Cathryn alone.

As Joe and Sam were busy adjusting to married life, as well as preparing to bring in the newest addition to the Waters family, Cliff found himself getting promoted to manager of The Point After while continuing in culinary school. On the side, he was gradually building his own catering business from scratch, at times joining his services in with the restaurant's catering in order to turn over larger profits. Penny found a new love interest in Mike Chandler (Timothy Williams), a suitor that Joe had an extremely hard time having around. Mike happened to be the lawyer hired by Penny's mother, Joe's ex-wife Janey (who was played in a 1985 guest appearance by Rebecca Balding, Walden's former Lou Grant co-star) to retrieve part of Joe's pro football salary that she had yet to receive as a part of her divorce settlement with him. During their legal dealings, Penny moved out of Janey's house when her mother remarried on a whim, and got her own studio apartment. She graduated from college the following spring, and was hired as a junior writer for a big-time advertising firm.

Other developments included Donald's close brush with a career in Hollywood, when he was hired to meet with a veteran movie actress in hopes of writing her biography. After getting lost in all of Tinseltown's glitz and glamour, Donald decided on his own will that Philly was where he truly belonged, and hired a "stringer" writer to collaborate on the biography project so he could return home. In November 1988, Lou was promoted to project designer in the offices of the large corporation that now owned Santini Construction. He was bribed into taking the promotion to keep quiet about an increase in accidents happening down at the job sites, as a result of inferior conditions and materials the new company provided. Upon finding this out, Lou was faced with a moral dilemma, and ended up quitting after 28 years on the job. He worked many odd jobs to compensate for his loss of income, before Donald proposed a business deal in which he found homeowners who needed private renovating done by a craftsman of Lou's expertise. A local mansion renovation job put Lou on the map, allowing him to buy out Donald's share in the partnership so he could become a stand-alone private contractor. Also, after his own steady succession of casual intimate encounters and regular boyfriends, Cliff's valiant search for Mr. Right continued, with a lot of help and advice from his family and friends.

=== Very special episodes ===
A couple of special episodes dealt with one of Joe's former teammates coming out, then feeling forced to admit that he was HIV-positive. Bubba Dean (guest star James Avery) actually revealed to Joe in a first-season episode that he was gay and had been holding a long-time torch for him. Then in a second season appearance, out of his fear of potentially spreading the virus, Bubba drops the news of his HIV infection at a party thrown by Donald. Since HIV and AIDS were not widely known to most Americans at the time, this episode had Joe learning about HIV and AIDS to better understand what his friend was going through so that he could offer support, as well as educating the public about HIV and AIDS and dispelling the myths about those who had contracted it and how it could be contracted.

Another episode in this category occurred in the second season, when Cliff learned that Connie (guest star Wendie Jo Sperber), his former fiancée whom he stood up at the altar in the pilot episode (although she was not seen in the pilot), was paying him a surprise visit after having spent a year being depressed — and gaining a lot of weight as the result of it. Cliff hesitated in making contact with her, but due to everyone's prompting they finally met face to face, and had a lot of hard feelings to address.

Veteran actress Billie Bird was the subject of a couple of two-parter episodes. Bird first appeared in the third season two-parter "Whose 'Golden Years' Is It Anyway?" (aired September 17 and 24, 1986), as Donald's Aunt Wilhelmina, who escapes to Philadelphia, and her nephew, when her family places her in a nursing home. Wilhelmina strikes up a friendship with Lou and ends up convincing him to keep her from being carted off back to the home; they promptly end up on the run without letting their family and friends know of their whereabouts. In the second part of this episode, an arrest warrant is brought out for Lou. Exactly a year later in season four, Wilhelmina shows up again in the two-parter "Las Vegas Serenade" (aired September 11 and 18, 1987), albeit through a VHS tape sent to Donald. It turned out to be her video will, which arrived with an urn of her ashes. Wilhelmina, in advance right before her death, set up an all-expenses paid trip to Las Vegas which the entire cast embarked on, with the exception of Kelly (Robin Riker began her temporary leave of absence with this episode). Donald and the gang were instructed by Wilhelmina to spread her ashes into the courtyard of the Golden Nugget Hotel & Casino while in Vegas. The trip was shot on location, mostly at the latter resort, and featured cameo appearances by Paul Anka and Jerry Lewis.

The fifth-season episode "L.A. Maltby" (aired September 1988), in which Donald travels out to Hollywood for the job offer of a lifetime, was perceived to be an attempt at a Brothers spin-off starring Philip Charles MacKenzie, centering on Donald's new glitz-filled life and career on the West Coast. Since the Hollywood storyline concluded in the same episode, with Donald choosing to return to Philadelphia, it is presumed that removing such an integral character from Brothers would have hurt the show, which was already undergoing many changes that year (read above). Since it was announced several months later that production on the series would end after five seasons, it can also be figured that hiring a replacement comic foil, or "contrast"-type character to play off the show's leads, wouldn't have been worth casting, even for almost 20 more episodes of Brothers.

== Scheduling ==
After premiering in July 1984, Brothers completed the run of its first season of 14 episodes in December of that year, with the now-popular Brothers Christmas Special (featuring guest star Andy García) serving as the season finale. Beginning in May 1985 and through the end of the 1987 season, Showtime usually ran new episodes of Brothers on a May to December season schedule, a common free-form timetable for any cable network. Each of the second through fourth seasons consisted of a 25 episode order with the final fifth season having the standard 25 episodes that other American series utilized.

The fifth season had its premiere moved up to June in 1988, and had its episodes spread out over the course of a year, with one or two new episodes airing each month. The pace of new episodes eased down during this season, first and foremost because of the 1988 Writers Guild of America Strike putting a halt to production during a portion of the season. After the strike ended, Showtime announced that Brothers was ending its run in 1989; episodes continued to air intermittently, since Showtime wanted a clear-cut five-year run while giving viewers enough to a chance to bid farewell to the series. The 25th episode of the fifth season, "The Road Yet Taken", was finally reached on May 5, 1989, and was the official series finale of Brothers. Then, a few weeks later on June 1, a "lost episode" produced during season three entitled "I Remember But I Don't Like It" aired. The episode featured most of the season three regulars, including Robin Riker but sans Mary Ann Pascal, and focused on Lou and Donald's most severe disagreement yet. As the others tried to figure out why the two were so angry at each other, a clip montage of Lou and Donald's relationship through the first three seasons was featured. Showtime presumably felt that this lost episode also served as a tribute to one of the show's key elements—the association between Lou and Donald. Showtime continued to air Brothers repeats on its schedule through late 1989.

For the majority of its original run, Brothers had aired Wednesday nights at 8/7c on Showtime, with episodes from its current season being repeated in various late night slots during the week on the premium cable network's schedule.

== Cast ==
- Robert Walden as Joe Waters
- Paul Regina as Cliff Waters
- Brandon Maggart as Lou Waters
- Philip Charles MacKenzie as Donald Maltby
- Hallie Todd as Penny Waters
- Robin Riker as Kelly Hall (Seasons 1–4)
- Mary Ann Pascal as Samantha "Sam" Booke Waters (Seasons 3–5)
- Yeardley Smith as Louella Waters (Seasons 4–5)
- Tommy Hinkley as Jim Grant (Season 4)
- Timothy Williams as Mike Chandler (Season 5)
- Cathryn Hacker as Caroline Waters (Season 5)

== Production notes ==
=== Opening sequence and presentation ===
The Brothers title theme was a jazzy, synthesized piece written by Marcus Barone, Joe Diamond and Gloria Nissenson, with opening vocals performed by Barone.

As the title sequence opens, videotaped exterior scenes of Philadelphia are shown one at a time as the show's title is spelled out, one letter at a time, across the screen. The title formation is set on a half-circular curve. During this, lead singer Barone has a conversation with two other men in preparation for them to sing the theme song with him. Apparently, they are supposed to be posing as the Waters brothers, to give viewers the illusion that they, and not the hired singers, are the ones harmonizing the tune. Following this, a chorus of shoop-do-wahs serve as a bridge between the dialogue and the main part of the song.

The opening credits featured an artistic montage of actual photos from Walden, Regina, and Maggart's childhood and young adult years (although the first photo of young Lou in the sequence was actually that of Brandon Maggart's son, Garett Maggart, when he was a baby). Also featured was 16mm film footage of young Paul Regina, labeled on a film strip in the sequence as "Cliff, age 4 yrs". This montage segued into a group photo of the Waters brothers in the current day, which in turn displayed singular portraits of them one at a time as their credits were given on screen. All cast member photos were set against a blue background. A time-lapsed animation version of the group photo then lifts up to reveal multiple photos of the brothers in various scenes from the show's set. From the pilot episode through the end of season three, Robin Riker and Hallie Todd's names were listed at the bottom of this section, while the pictures floated against a sky background.

The final part of the opening sequence is a videotaped scene of the Waters brothers, finishing their lip-syncing of the show's theme song in front of a candy store named "Babe's". For the first two seasons, "and Philip Charles MacKenzie as Donald" appeared during this scene, followed by creator and producer credits before the sequence faded. During the entire third season, a computerized blue background with a digital cut-out of MacKenzie appeared with his credit before cutting to the "Babe's" scene. Starting with the fourth-season premiere, the photos of Robin Riker (now credited as Robin Riker-Hasley) and Hallie Todd were featured for the first time over the floating pictures animation, flipping up one at a time, until the last photo is that of MacKenzie, who now appears in a proper portrait. The last three cast portraits were set in blue backgrounds to match those of Walden, Regina, and Maggart's. Also, from this point on, creator and producing credits no longer appeared in the opening's last scene.

For the eleven episodes of season four that Riker-Hasley did not appear in, her photo and credit were removed from the intro, with only Todd and MacKenzie showing up in the latter half. This short-lived version of the intro had the dark blue backgrounds removed from Todd and MacKenzie, revealing the natural light-blue backgrounds of their photos instead. For season four, episode twenty-five, which was Riker-Hasley's return to the show, as well as her last appearance, the intro that was used in season four, episodes one through fourteen returned. In season five, after Riker-Hasley's departure, Mary Ann Pascal's photo was added into the sequence, between Todd and MacKenzie. The latter three cast photos in general were all new (with Todd's and MacKenzie's updated from the season four versions), and featured more natural backgrounds in gray/light blue/white tones. They filled the entire screen, as the floating pictures animation was eliminated.

Three different credit fonts were utilized on Brothers simultaneously. The opening sequence used orange-gold hued Collegiate font for the title and credits; a font famously associated with sports teams (as well as colleges and universities), it was used to represent the show's underlying image of masculinity—brotherhood, The Point After, sports and Joe's past NFL glory. First and final scene production credits were set in Cooper Black font, orange during the first two and a half seasons, then in yellow from the middle of season three until the end (black shadowing was added at the start of season four). Closing credits all through the run appeared in thin yellow Helvetica, and were carded in groups over scenes from the current episode. An instrumental cut of the opening theme, dominated by saxophone, was used for the closing.

Upon the show's fall 1989 debut in syndication, the opening title sequence was truncated so that the only visuals featured in the first half were the title formation over the scenes of Philadelphia, the single photos of Walden, Regina and Maggart, and the time-lapsed group photo of the Waters brothers. The theme itself began from the "Gonna meet the family..." line, and ran up to "Where it counts, behind the scenes, we're brothers" line when the time-lapsed family photo was reached. During the last three cast credits and ending scene, the song picked up from the "Life is full of stress and strife..." line and ran through the end, unedited.

== Episodes ==
=== Series overview ===
Season	Episodes	Originally released	
Season	Episodes	First released	Last released
1	14	July 13, 1984	December 16, 1984
2	25	April 25, 1985	December 11, 1985
3	25	April 23, 1986	December 3, 1986
4	25	May 8, 1987	December 4, 1987
5	26	June 24, 1988	June 1, 1989

=== Season 1: 1984 ===
No. overall	No. in season	Title	Directed by	Written by	Original release date
1	1	"The Wedding"	Joel Zwick	David Lloyd^{1}	July 13, 1984
2	2	"You Brought a New Kind of Love to Me"	Joel Zwick	Greg Antonacci	August 16, 1984
3	3	"Lizards Ain't Snakes"	Joel Zwick	Stu Silver	August 23, 1984
4	4	"Mindless Passion"	Joel Zwick	Greg Antonacci, Stu Silver, Marc Sotkin	August 30, 1984
5	5	"Fear of Flying"	Greg Antonacci	Stu Silver, Greg Antonacci	September 6, 1984
6	6	"Monte Carlo Night"	Joel Zwick	Jeffrey Richman, Joyce Gittlin	September 13, 1984
7	7	"He Ain't Witty, He's My Brother"	Joel Zwick	Jeffrey Richman, Joyce Gittlin	September 20, 1984
8	8	"And Baby Makes Two"	Greg Antonacci	Greg Antonacci, Stu Silver	September 27, 1984
9	9	"Fools Russian"	John Pasquin	Stephen Neigher	October 4, 1984
10	10	"Standards and Practices"	Shelley Jensen	James Berg, Stan Zimmerman	October 11, 1984
11	11	"Liza"	Sam Weisman	Stu Silver	October 18, 1984
12	12	"It Only Hurts When I'm Gay"	Shelley Jensen	Stephen Neigher	October 25, 1984
13	13	"I Remember Papa"	Greg Antonacci	Greg Antonacci	November 1, 1984
14	14	"Happy Birthday Mel"	Greg Antonacci	Greg Antonacci, Stu Silver	December 16, 1984

=== Season 2: 1985 ===
No. overall	No. in season	Title	Directed by	Written by	Original release date
15	1	"An Affair to Remember"	Joel Zwick	Greg Antonacci, Stu Silver	April 25, 1985
16	2	"Your Brother's Keeper"	Tom Trbovich	Greg Antonacci, Stu Silver	May 2, 1985
17	3	"The Fourth Ball"	Tom Trbovich	Mark Masuoka	May 9, 1985
18	4	"Life's Too Short to Be Delicate"	Linda Day	Nick LeRose	May 16, 1985
19	5	"Donald's Old Flame"	Shelley Jensen	Ron Burla	May 30, 1985
20	6	"The Girl Most Likely"	Dick Martin	Lissa Levin	June 6, 1985
21	7	"Donald's Dad"	Jerry Lewis	Greg Antonacci, Stu Silver	June 13, 1985
22	8	"Let the Eagle Fly"	Greg Antonacci	Greg Antonacci, Stu Silver	June 20, 1985
23	9	"The Proof Is in the PJs"	Joel Zwick	Mark Masuoka	July 11, 1985
24	10	"A House Divided"	Shelley Jensen	Jack Burns	July 18, 1985
25	11	"The Sting"	Greg Antonacci	Greg Antonacci, Stu Silver	August 1, 1985
26	12	"Happy Birthday, Baby Brother"	Shelley Jensen	Nick LeRose	August 8, 1985
27	13	"To Play or Not to Play"	Shelley Jensen	Jack Burns	August 15, 1985
28	14	"The Greatest Story Never Told"	Howard Storm	Mark Masuoka	September 4, 1985
29	15	"Amongst My Souvenirs"	Greg Antonacci	Robert Schechter	September 11, 1985
30	16	"Rhino Rhapsody"	Greg Antonacci	Nick LeRose	September 18, 1985
31	17	"Donald's Air Force Blues"	Shelley Jensen	Jack Burns	October 2, 1985
32	18	"It Ain't Over Til It's Over"	Shelley Jensen	Ron Burla	October 9, 1985
33	19	"The Stranger"	Greg Antonacci	Greg Antonacci	October 23, 1985
34	20	"Father, Father"	Dick Martin	Greg Antonacci, Nick LeRose	October 30, 1985
35	21	"A Greasepaint Smile"	John Bowab	Mark Masuoka	November 6, 1985
36	22	"Godzilla Meets Bambi"	Greg Antonacci	Greg Antonacci, Stu Silver	November 13, 1985
37	23	"Gobba, Gobba"	Greg Antonacci	Stu Silver	November 27, 1985
38	24	"A Carnation by Any Other Name"	Shelley Jensen	Robert Walden	December 4, 1985
39	25	"The Shoop Shoop Shop"	Greg Antonacci	Greg Antonacci	December 11, 1985

=== Season 3: 1986 ===
No. overall	No. in season	Title	Directed by	Written by	Original release date
40	1	"Hairball Blues"	Greg Antonacci	Greg Antonacci, Nick LeRose	April 23, 1986
41	2	"Take Me Out of the Ball Game"	Shelley Jensen	Robert Schechter	April 30, 1986
42	3	"Donald's Half-Sister"	Dick Martin	Greg Antonacci, Nick LeRose	May 7, 1986
43	4	"The Seduction of Lou"	Gary Brown	Nick LeRose	May 14, 1986
44	5	"A Penny a Dance"	Dick Martin	Katherine Green	May 28, 1986
45	6	"Wake Me Up Before You Go Go"	Dick Martin	Mark Masuoka	June 4, 1986
46	7	"Blind Love"	Shelley Jensen	Ron Burla	June 11, 1986
47	8	"Brothers Three"	Scott Redman	Katherine Green	June 25, 1986
48	9	"The Song Remains the Same"	Lee Shallat Chemel	Nick LeRose	June 18, 1986
49	10	"The Play's the Thing"	Greg Antonacci	Greg Antonacci	July 9, 1986
50	11	"Harry and the Ogre of Ock"	Shelley Jensen	Marshall Barer	July 15, 1986
51	12	"Mother's Day"	Greg Antonacci	Greg Antonacci, Katherine Green, Nick LeRose	July 30, 1986
52	13	"Two-Timin' Man"	Jules Lichtman	Alicia Marie Schudt	August 6, 1986
53	14	"If I Only Had a Watchamacallit"	Shelley Jensen	Russell Marcus	August 20, 1986
54	15	"Goodbye, Cliffie"	Lee Shallat Chemel	Paul Chitlik, Jeremy Bertrand Finch	September 3, 1986
55	16	"Joe Leaves This Old World Behind"	Lee Shallat Chemel	Nick LeRose	September 10, 1986
56	17	"Whose 'Golden Years' Is It, Anyway?: Part 1"	Greg Antonacci	Greg Antonacci, Nick LeRose	September 17, 1986
57	18	"Whose 'Golden Years' Is It, Anyway?: Part 2"	Greg Antonacci	Greg Antonacci, Nick LeRose	September 24, 1986
58	19	"Lay the Points"	Lee Shallat Chemel	Mike Weinberger	October 8, 1986
59	20	"The Boxer"	Shelley Jensen	Katherine Green	October 15, 1986
60	21	"The Gang Who Could Shoot Straight"	Jules Lichtman	Arnie Kogen	October 29, 1986
61	22	"A Penny for Your Dreams"	Marc Gass	Lissa Levin	November 5, 1986
62	23	"Iceman"	Lee Shallat Chemel	Rick Newberger	November 12, 1986
63	24	"Still Married After All These Years"	Greg Antonacci	Greg Antonacci	November 19, 1986
64	25	"Mi Casa Es Sewer Casa"	Greg Antonacci	Greg Antonacci, Nick LeRose	December 3, 1986

=== Season 4: 1987 ===
No. overall	No. in season	Title	Directed by	Written by	Original release date
65	1	"Wedding Bell Blues"	Shelley Jensen	Nick LeRose, Lissa Levin	May 8, 1987
66	2	"What?"	Shelley Jensen	Nick LeRose	May 15, 1987
67	3	"Chez Cliff"	Shelley Jensen	Nick LeRose, Lissa Levin	May 29, 1987
68	4	"Love and Learn"	Shelley Jensen	Rick Newberger	June 5, 1987
69	5	"Leave It to Cleavage"	Philip Charles MacKenzie	Lissa Levin	June 12, 1987
70	6	"Fear of Heights"	Shelley Jensen	^{N/A}	June 19, 1987
71	7	"Cliff's Magic Recipe"	Robert Walden	Rick Newberger	June 26, 1987
72	8	"On the Rebound"	Marc Gass	^{N/A}	July 10, 1987
73	9	"Old Man Waters"	Jules Lichtman	Nick LeRose	July 17, 1987
74	10	"Home Is Where the Heart Is"	Shelley Jensen	^{N/A}	July 24, 1987
75	11	"Man's Choice"	Philip Charles MacKenzie	Lissa Levin	July 31, 1987
76	12	"Starry, Starry Nightmare"	Shelley Jensen	Nick LeRose, Lissa Levin	August 21, 1987
77	13	"Penny and the Hard Hat"	Shelley Jensen	^{N/A}	August 28, 1987
78	14	"Las Vegas Serenade: Part 1"	Shelley Jensen	^{N/A}	September 11, 1987
79	15	"The Point After No More?"	Shelley Jensen	Nick LeRose	August 1, 1987
80	16	"Las Vegas Serenade: Part 2"	^{N/A}	^{N/A}	September 18, 1987
81	17	"One on One"	^{N/A}	^{N/A}	September 25, 1987
82	18	"The Farmer Always Rings Twice"	Philip Charles MacKenzie	Ray Morton, Timothy Williams	October 2, 1987
83	19	"Bachelor Father"	Jules Lichtman	Nick LeRose	October 9, 1987
84	20	"Masquerade"	^{N/A}	^{N/A}	October 30, 1987
85	21	"Thanksgiving"	Philip Charles MacKenzie	Nick LeRose	November 20, 1987
86	22	"Stolen Pleasures"	Shelley Jensen	^{N/A}	December 11, 1987
87	23	"Is the Caller There?"	Leonard R. Garner Jr.	Nick LeRose, Rick Newberger	November 6, 1987
88	24	"The Windsor War"	Leonard R. Garner Jr.	Nick LeRose, Rick Newberger	November 13, 1987
89	25	"There's a Lid for Every Pot"	Philip Charles MacKenzie	Nick LeRose	December 4, 1987

=== Season 5: 1988–89 ===
No. overall	No. in season	Title	Directed by	Written by	Original release date
90	1	"Sittin' in a Tree"	Philip Charles MacKenzie	Nick LeRose	June 24, 1988
91	2	"Barney, We Hardly Knew Ye"	Shelley Jensen	Ray Morton, Timothy Williams	July 8, 1988
92	3	"I'll Know When My Love Comes Along"	Shelley Jensen	Rick Newberger	July 15, 1988
93	4	"L. A. Maltby"	Shelley Jensen	Nick LeRose	September 30, 1988
94	5	"Hustle Up"	Robert Walden	Nick LeRose, Rick Newberger	October 7, 1988
95	6	"But I Know What I Like"	Robert Walden	David Pascal	October 21, 1988
96	7	"Moving Out"	Philip Charles MacKenzie	Timothy Williams, Ray Morton	October 28, 1988
97	8	"A Job Well Done"	Shelley Jensen	Rick Newberger	November 4, 1988
98	9	"Two for the Seesaw"	Shelley Jensen	Rick Newberger	November 11, 1988
99	10	"Nothin' Says Lovin'"	Shelley Jensen	Nick LeRose	December 2, 1988
100	11	"The Detour"	Philip Charles MacKenzie	Chip Hayes	December 16, 1988
101	12	"Guardian Angels"	Wendy Acey	Ray Morton, Timothy Williams	December 30, 1988
102	13	"A Study in Maltby"	Shelley Jensen	Nick LeRose, Rick Newberger	January 6, 1989
103	14	"Nanny from Heaven"	Shelley Jensen	Danny Kreitzberg	January 13, 1989
104	15	"The Point After Bowling Team"	Shelley Jensen	Nick LeRose^{2}	January 20, 1989
105	16	"Isn't It Romantic?"	Shelley Jensen	Rick Newberger	February 17, 1989
106	17	"Three Infants and a Baby"	Robert Walden	Robert Walden	February 24, 1989
107	18	"Guarding the Nest"	Shelley Jensen	Nick Lerose, Rick Newberger (teleplay); Danny Kreitzberg (story)	March 3, 1989
108	19	"Inherit the Bar"	Shelley Jensen	Timothy Williams, Ray Morton	March 17, 1989
109	20	"Sam's Dad"	Philip Charles MacKenzie	Nick LeRose, Gary Nardino	March 10, 1989
110	21	"Fantasy in Ebony"	^{N/A}	^{N/A}	April 7, 1989
111	22	"Big"	Philip Charles MacKenzie	Rick Newberger	April 14, 1989
112	23	"Something Old, Something New"	Shelley Jensen	Danny Kreitzberg, Ray Morton, Timothy Williams	April 21, 1989
113	24	"Wouldn't It Be Nice"	Leonard R. Garner Jr.	^{N/A}	April 28, 1989
114	25	"The Road Yet Taken"	Philip Charles MacKenzie	Shelley Jensen, Nick LeRose, Gary Nardino	May 5, 1989
115	26	"I Remember But I Don't Like It"	Lee Shallat Chemel	Greg Antonacci	June 1, 1989

Notes

^1 Is listed in every episode as David Lloyd (creator). His name only appears in the table if he performed the additional role.
^2 Contributing writers included Danny Kreitzberg, Katherine Green, Rick Newberger, and Lissa Levin.
^N/A The source had no data.

=== Music scores ===
All five seasons of the show were musically scored by Dan Foliart and Howard Pearl.

Foliart composed scores for Home Improvement during its entire eight-year run (1991–99). In 1994, Robin Riker would join the cast of Home Improvement sister series Thunder Alley, which Pearl scored for.

== Awards and nominations ==
Year	Award	Result	Category	Recipient
1985	CableACE Awards	Nominated	Actor in a Comedy Series	Robert Walden
1985	CableACE Awards	Nominated	Actor in a Comedy Series	Brandon Maggart
1985	CableACE Awards	Won	Actor in a Comedy Series	Philip Charles MacKenzie
1987	CableACE Awards	Nominated	Actress in a Comedy Series	Hallie Todd
1987	CableACE Awards	Nominated	Actress in a Comedy Series	Robin Riker
1987	CableACE Awards	Nominated	Actor in a Comedy Series	Robert Walden
1987	CableACE Awards	Nominated	Actor in a Comedy Series	Brandon Maggart
1987	CableACE Awards	Nominated	Actor in a Comedy Series	Philip Charles MacKenzie
1988	CableACE Awards	Nominated	Actress in a Comedy Series	Robin Riker
1985	Artios Awards	Nominated	Best Casting for TV, Comedy Episodic	Mary Ann Barton and Helen Mossler
