= Playstudios =

American mobile game developer

Playstudios Inc is a developer of free-to-play mobile games headquartered in Las Vegas, Nevada, United States. Founded in 2011, it develops and publishes games including myVEGAS Slots, Tetris mobile app, MGM Slots Live. Its loyalty program -PlayAwards offers real-world rewards to players from partners such as MGM Resorts International and Norwegian Cruise Line. Playstudios is publicly traded on the Nasdaq stock exchange with the ticker symbol MYPS and maintains international offices in Israel, Hong Kong, Serbia and Vietnam.

== History ==
Playstudios was founded in 2011 by a group of gaming and hospitality entrepreneurs led by Andrew Pascal currently serving as chairman and CEO of the company. In 2012, Playstudios released its first and one of its most notable games - myVEGAS Slots on Facebook and published the mobile version of the game in 2013.

During this period, Playstudios secured investments from Activision Blizzard and MGM Resorts International and introduced a loyalty program – PlayAwards which allows players to earn loyalty points in its games for real-world rewards such as meals and hotel stays across MGM Resorts International properties. In October 2019, Playstudios redesigned PlayAwards introducing advanced B2B tools for its growing partners which include Wolfgang Puck, Norwegian Cruise Line, Virgin Voyages, IHG Hotels & Resorts, and Bowleo. As of 2025, PlayAwards had reportedly disbursed over $864 million dollars in over 17 million rewards to players worldwide.

On 22 June 2021, Playstudios was listed on the Nasdaq stock exchange trading under the ticker symbol MYPS following a merger with Acies Acquisition Corp – a special purpose acquisition company in a deal valued at $1.1 billion dollars on 21 June same year.

PLAYSTUDIOS has a portfolio of casual and casino games. The casino products are managed and supported by its studios in Tel Aviv and Asia (Hong Kong, Singapore and Vietnam), while its casual portfolio is managed by its teams in the Americas (San Francisco, Portland, and Las Vegas).

== Acquisitions and partnerships ==
Playstudios began its international expansion in 2016 following its acquisition of Scene53 an Israel-based studio specializing in a real time avatar based social platform. The Tel Aviv team is responsible for the mobile app game – POP! Slots that enables group play, including competitions, cooperative and shared jackpots and interaction with friends.

The company expanded its game library through partnerships with notable gaming brands including Konami Gaming to launch my KONAMI Slots. In 2022, Playstudios secured the exclusive global mobile rights to the Tetris franchise. The rights were extended for another eight years in November 2023.

Playstudios acquired Brainium – a mobile game studio based in Portland, Oregon that specializes in casual games known for titles such as Solitaire and Sudoku, marking Playstudios expansion into casual game genre.

== Games ==
Playstudios produces over a dozen games across different genres including social casinos, puzzle and classic games, and word games. Its social casino games include myVEGAS Slots, POP! Slots, my KONAMI Slots, MGM Slots Live, along with myVEGAS Blackjack and Bingo. Its puzzle and classic titles include Tetris, Tetris Block Party, Tetris Block Puzzle, Sudoku, Solitaire, Spider Solitaire, Jumbline 2, Mahjong and its word game, Word Search Star.

In addition to its game portfolio, PS organized and produced the $1 million World Tournament of Slots, a real-world slot competition hosted in partnership with The Atlantis in the Bahamas.
