= Communities In Schools =

American non-profit organization

Communities In Schools (CIS) is an American non-profit organization that works within public and charter schools with the aim of helping at-risk students stay in school. CIS works with schools in 25 states and the District of Columbia. With these schools, CIS provides students with basic needs including clothing, food, life skills, family engagement, and mental health.

In February 2020, CIS announced that VIA Metropolitan Transit Board of Trustees chairman and former San Antonio City Councilman Rey Saldaña would become the new president and CEO.

== National evaluation ==
=== Overview ===
In 2005, CIS was awarded a 14 million dollar contract to evaluate its national network and programming. ICF International was contracted to conduct the five-year longitudinal study titled 'The National Evaluation of Communities In Schools'. The study was designed to determine the effectiveness of the CIS model. Based on an in-depth analysis of 1,776 schools served by CIS, a comparative analysis of outcomes from more than 1,200 CIS served and non-CIS served comparison schools, and comparative analysis of CIS served students and non-CIS served students alongside in-depth case studies of students. The study was being conducted in three phases.

=== Results ===
According to CIS, their model is one of few, among dropout prevention programs, in the United States that is shown to keep students in school. They state that it is the only dropout prevention program in the nation with scientific evidence to prove that it can increase graduation rates. They also state that their model results in a higher percentage of students reaching proficiency in fourth- and eighth- grade reading and mathematics, when implemented with high fidelity. Finally, their report indicates that effective implementation of their model correlates more strongly with positive school-level outcomes (dropout and graduation rates, achievement, etc.), than does the uncoordinated provision of service alone. They state that this results in notable improvements of school-level outcomes in the context of the CIS model.
