= International Game Technology (1975–2015) =

American gaming company founded in 1975

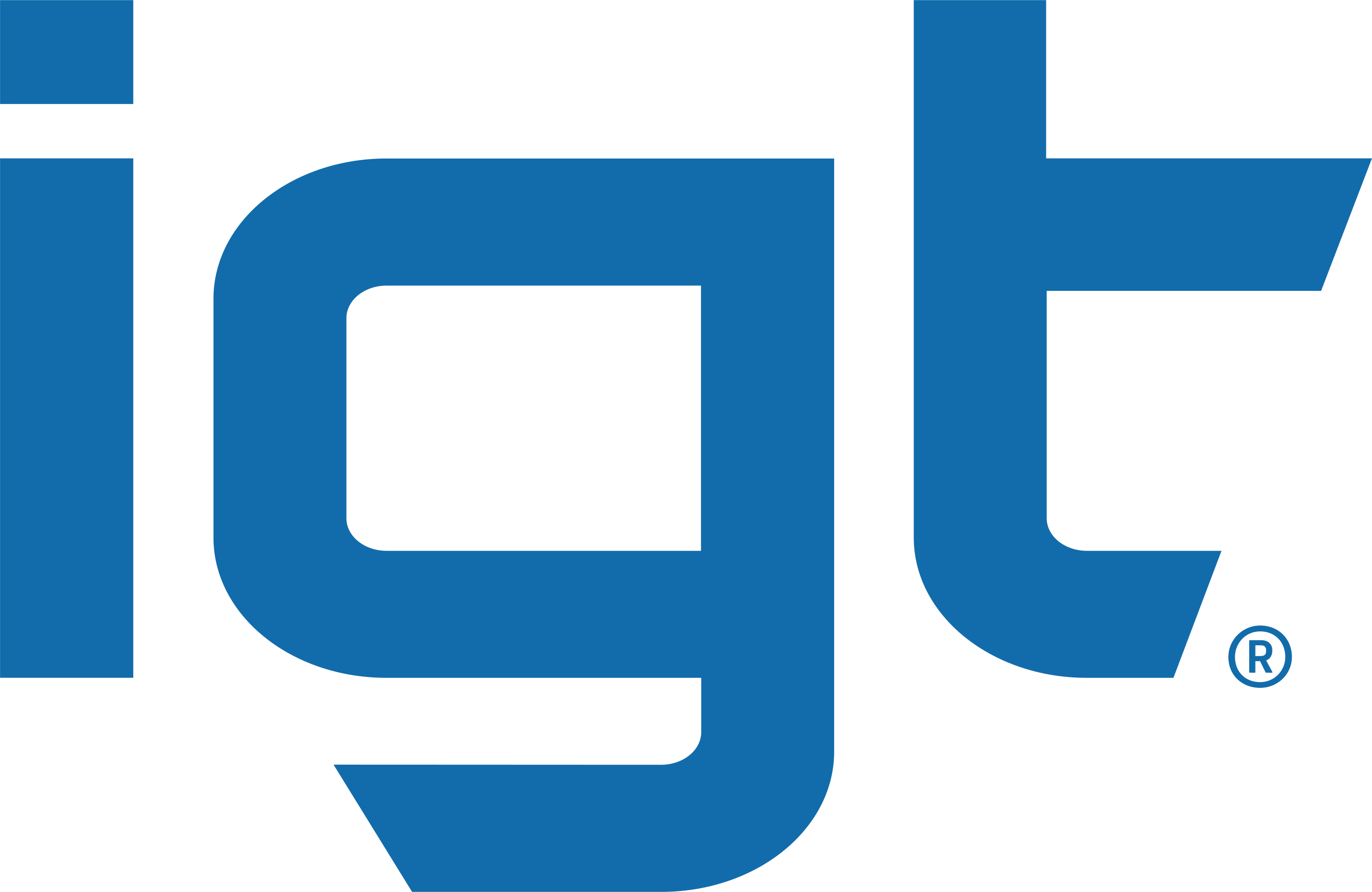
- Industry: Gambling Technology
- Founded: 1975; 51 years ago
- Founder: William Redd
- Defunct: 2015
- Fate: Acquired by GTECH
- Successor: International Game Technology
- Headquarters: Las Vegas, Nevada
- Products: Slot machines, Online gambling

International Game Technology (IGT) was an American gaming company based in Las Vegas that manufactured and distributed slot machines and other gambling technology. It was acquired in 2015 by GTECH for $6.4 billion, which then adopted the IGT name.

== History ==
=== 1975–1990 ===
IGT was founded as an A-1 Supply by William "Si" Redd in 1975. It changed its name to Sircoma in 1978, and then to International Game Technology (IGT) in 1981. The company went public in 1981, following its success in the video poker machine industry.

In 1984, IGT acquired Electronic Data Technologies, becoming one of the first companies to use the Computerized Player Tracking concept (CPT), which later contributed to the growth of 'frequent-player rewards' programs. This initial system gave casinos new marketing tools in player management, and over time, the tracking system evolved into the company's IGT Advantage and SBX systems.

After IGT's IPO and NASDAQ listing, the company introduced the S-Slot. This marked its entry into the spinning-reel slot market, and the Player's Edge video poker machine. IGT also launched the Nevada Megabucks slot machine, the first wide-area progressive slot machine system with a $1 million base jackpot. Additionally, IGT established an office in Australia to target the club market.

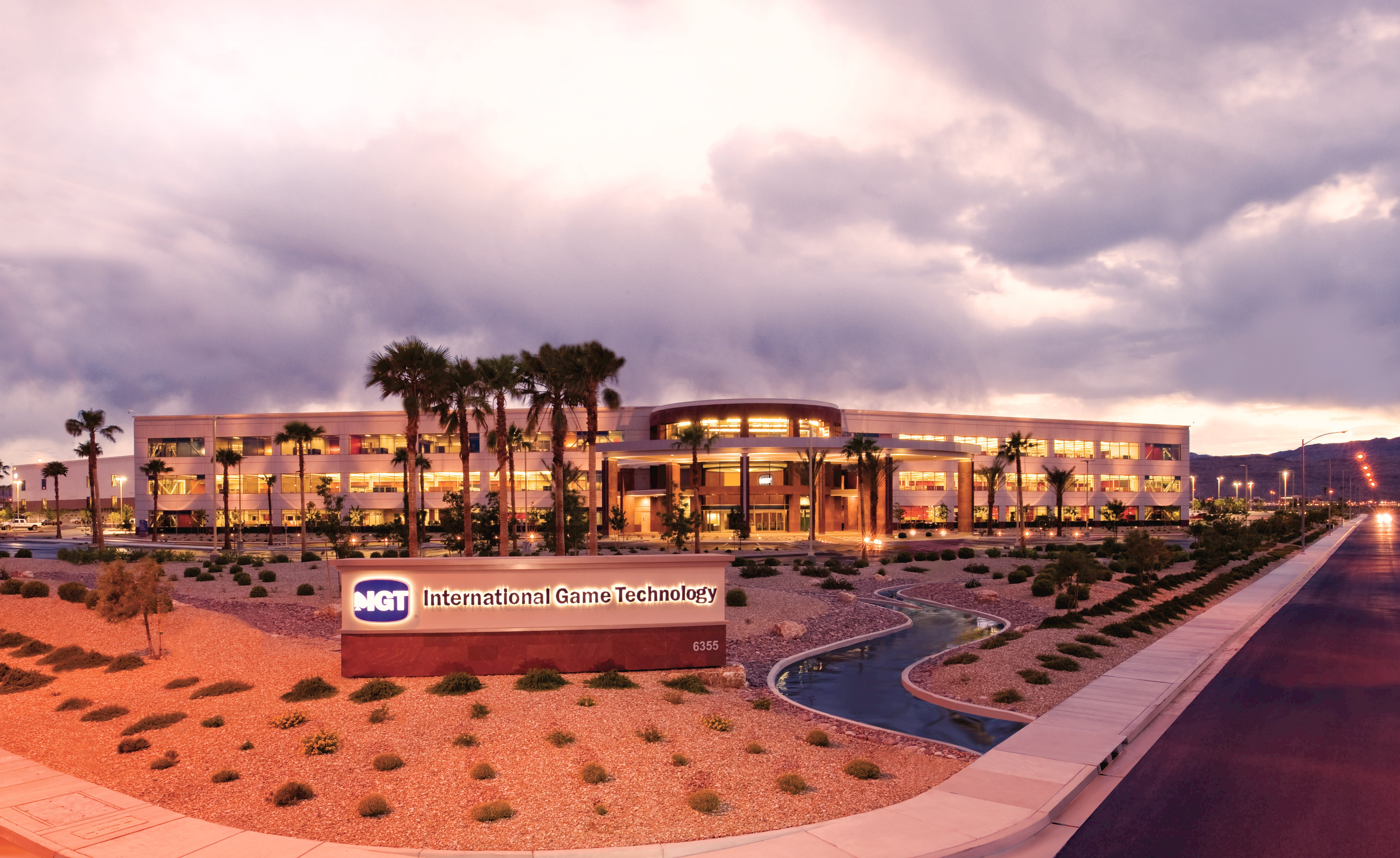
IGT's Las Vegas office

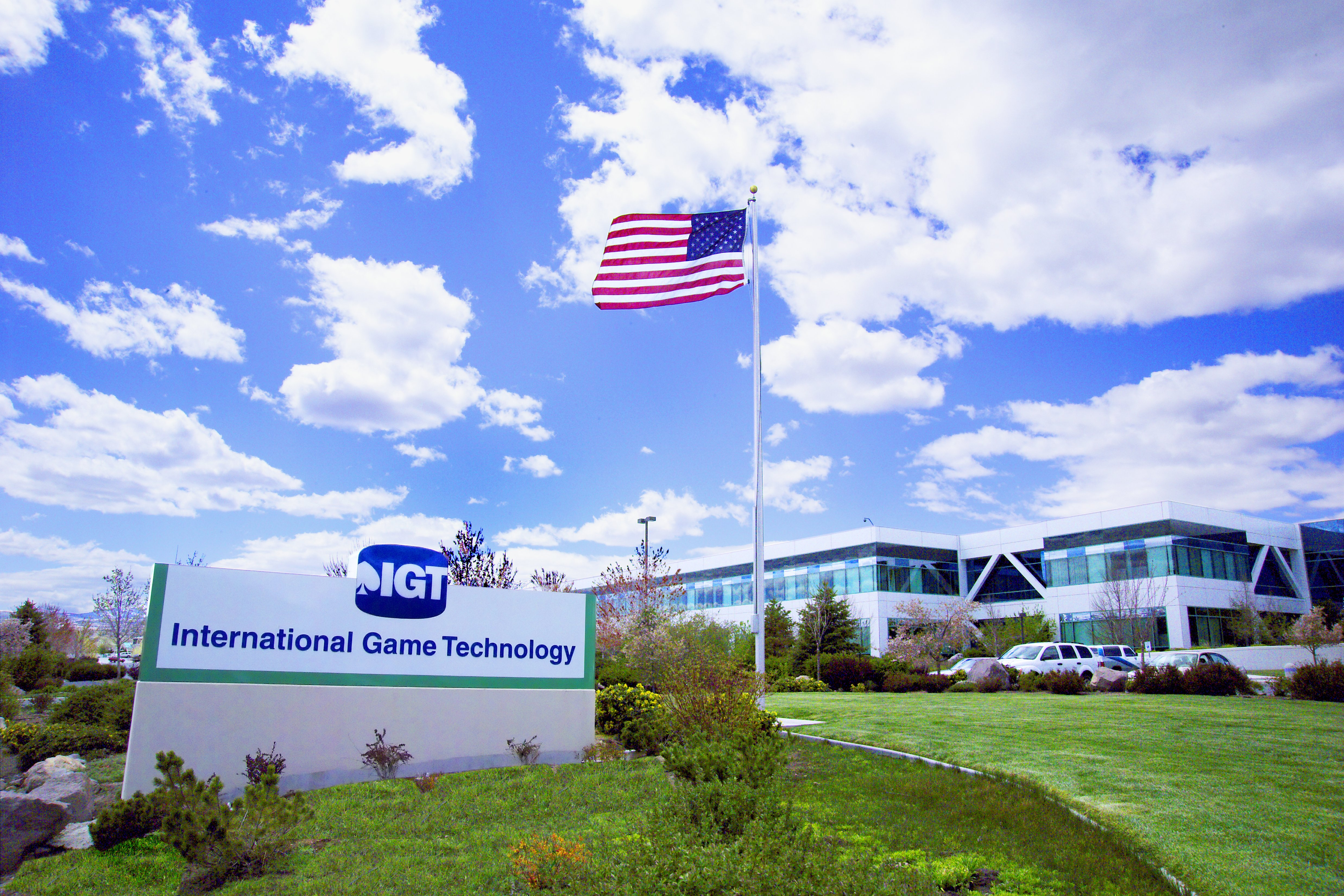
IGT's Reno office

=== 1991–2000 ===
In January 1991, a decade after its initial public offering, IGT was listed on the New York Stock Exchange (NYSE). The following year, IGT Europe was established to service casinos across the continent, and commissioned new offices in South Africa, and Argentina.

In 1996, IGT licensed the game show Wheel of Fortune for a line of slot machines; chairman Charles Mathewson had encountered a Sony Pictures Television executive by chance at an awards show.

During this time, they also introduced The Game King video product which featured multi-denomination technology.

In 1998, IGT acquired Barcrest Gaming, located in the United Kingdom, along with Sodak Gaming, the distributor for the Native American market. In that time, IGT also introduced Triple Play Draw Poker through its partnership with Action Gaming, and an Elvis-themed slot machine. Their new S2000 spinning reel slot machine system was brought to the market in 1999.

=== 2001–2012 ===
In 2001, IGT became a member of the S&P 500. The company also continued to acquire gaming companies including Silicon Gaming and Anchor Gaming. The acquisition of Anchor Gaming resulted in doubled gaming operations revenue. The Anchor acquisition also gave IGT the rights to patents it had licensed for bonus wheels on slot machines, which were being leveraged for the Wheel of Fortune line.

During 2003, IGT acquired Acres Gaming. The company's bonuses and systems technology were a significant addition to IGT's games and systems products. In 2004, the company introduced its central determination system (CDS) as well as its Class II bingo games and systems to the Native American market. IGT Canada was established to serve the emerging Canadian lottery and gaming markets.

In 2005, IGT celebrated its 25th anniversary as a publicly traded company. During that year IGT acquired Wager Works, and the company unveiled its first multi-level progressive Mega Jackpots product, known as Fort Knox. In an effort to take advantage of emerging markets, new IGT offices were opened in Macau, Mexico and Russia.

Group play and community bonus games were introduced to the marketplace in 2006 with the debut of Wheel of Fortune Special Edition. The company also celebrated its 10th anniversary of Wheel of Fortune slots, as well as the 20th anniversary of the Megabucks wide area progressive game.

During the Global Gaming Expo in Las Vegas in 2006, IGT revealed the M-P Series. The new multi-player concept focused on roulette and baccarat and was the first of the company's electronic multi-player table game products.

In 2007, IGT worked to grow its Mexican gaming operation and product sales in the Japanese and Asian markets. In addition, a new IGT office was opened in China. Two intellectual property arrangements were also announced. These included an arrangement with Austrian-based Novomatic focusing on IGT's M-P Series multi-player product and with Pure Depth, Inc. for its 3D-like, Multi-Layer Display (MLD) technology.

IGT opened the Global Technology & Interoperability Center in Reno, Nevada, early in 2008. This first-of-its-kind research and testing center encompasses a 6,500-square-foot (600 m^{2}) facility, which is available for use by gaming manufacturers, customers, and third-party gaming product manufacturers. The collaborative center focuses on product testing in a true-to-life casino atmosphere prior to market release. In an effort to diversify business and market opportunities in the United Kingdom, the company acquired Cyber-view Technology, Inc.

The company opened IGT Technology Development (Beijing) Co., Ltd. in Beijing, China, in March 2009. The office was established to research and develop gaming, application and systems in addition to providing support, technical services and training.

In 2009, Patti S. Hart was appointed as IGT's new president and CEO. That year also saw the release of SBX Tier One package by IGT Network Systems.

Sex and the City Slots were introduced in fall 2009 in the United States. This game features game play with bonus rounds on a multi-level progressive jackpots platform. The year ended with IGT's SBX Experience Management System being installed at ARIA Resort & Casino at City Center in Las Vegas. ARIA's casino floor opened with a first-of-its-kind combination of IGT systems on the server-based network, including IGT Advantage and SBX.

IGT started 2010 with a repeat win at the International Gaming Awards as Best Slot Manufacturer of the Year and continued to win awards throughout the year. These included 16 awards in Casino Player magazine's Best of Gaming for 2010, top honors in Global Gaming Business' 8th Annual Gaming and Technology Awards, wins in the inaugural Casino Enterprise Management Hospitality Operations Technology Awards, and 35 awards in Strictly Slots Best of Slots Awards.

In the spring of 2010, IGT's SBX Experience Management System was installed in the first European locations as SBX went live at Casino D'Evian in France. This was followed by a number of additional European installations including Casino di Venezia in Italy and Grand Casino Helsinki in Finland.

In November 2010, the Company celebrated the production of its two millionth slot machine.

Late 2010 also saw the creation of an Interactive division within IGT dedicated to further building its online and mobile gaming presence. IGT's Wager Works and Million-2-1 groups merged into a single global division headquartered in San Francisco, California. This new division provides gaming products to online and mobile markets in regulated, legal markets globally. The year ended with a substantial go-live for both IGT's network systems products and games. The new casino resort, Cosmopolitan of Las Vegas, opened floor-wide in sbX; the majority floor share of games; plus, an entire suite of IGT Advantage system products.

IGT acquired Entraction in 2011. It was a poker network and video game developer with headquarters in Stockholm, Sweden. It also acquired Double Down in 2012, a Facebook game company with its headquarters in Seattle.

=== 2013–present ===
In January 2013, IGT filed its preliminary proxy materials and indicated that it had received a Notice of Intent to Nominate four director candidates for election to the IGT Board at the Company's 2013 Annual Meeting through The Ader Group, run by Jason Ader. The intent of the notice was to inform IGT and its shareholders of a proxy battle that was going to take place, and that the Ader group's nominees include the slot-machine maker's former chief executive Charles Mathewson, and Jason Ader himself.

Following the initial release by IGT, The Ader Group issued a statement claiming that IGT relayed inaccurate information concerning Jason Ader and the Ader Group's proxy fight. The initial filing with the Securities and Exchange Commission by IGT suggested that Ader's group seeks election to the board, as Ader and Mathewson control 3 percent of IGT, (8.05 million shares), and they are seeking additional proxies for the company's 2013 annual shareholder meeting to put Mathewson back on the board IGT. IGT maintained its original statement.

On January 11, 2013, the Ader Group filed its proxy indicating that it had nominated three people for the IGT board, of which Jason Ader was not one of the candidates. The proxy statement claimed that IGT had lost value as a result of the decisions and direction of its leadership.

The Ader Group filed its action letter outlining its reasons for the proxy fight and urging stockholders to vote for the Gold slate on January 28, 2013.

In July 2014, Italian gaming equipment company Gtech agreed to acquire IGT for a total of $6.4 billion, including $4.7 billion in cash and $1.7 billion in assumed debt. The companies would be combined under a new holding company based in the United Kingdom and the Gtech name would be dropped.

On April 7, 2015, Gtech completed its merger with IGT, the new merger was named International Game Technology PLC.

== Games ==
=== Slots and video poker ===
First-party

- 100 Play
- All Star Poker
- Black Goddess
- Cats
- Cleopatra
- Double Diamond
- Golden Widow
- Hexbreaker
- Kitty Glitter
- Megabucks
- Multi-Strike Poker
- Pharaohs Fortune
- Quick Quads
- Red, White & Blue
- Siberian Storm
- Spin Poker
- Super Times Pay
- Top Dollar
- Triple Chance Poker
- Triple/Five/Ten Play
- Ultimate X
- White Orchid
- Wolf Run

Third-party

- Elvis
- The Price Is Right
- Family Feud
- Jeopardy!
- Let's Make a Deal
- Sale of the Century
- The $25,000 Pyramid
- The $100,000 Pyramid
- The $1,000,000 Pyramid
- The Amazing Race
- The Dating Game
- The Joker's Wild
- The Newlywed Game
- Sex and the City
- Star Wars
- Wheel of Fortune

=== Online wagering ===
The IGT Interactive division provides regulatory-compliant mobile apps for slot, table and lottery games to various online wagering companies, including Paddy Power, William Hill and Betfair. Currently online gaming is prohibited in the United States, due to the Unlawful Internet Gambling Enforcement Act of 2006.

In 2005, IGT purchased the British focused online gaming supplier Wagerworks for $90 million. In 2010, IGT created a new Interactive division, based in San Francisco, by combining the separate mobile- and internet-based groups Million-2-1 and WagerWorks. The Interactive division also has offices in Paddington, London In March 2011, the IGT Interactive division consolidated its operations into a new 45,884-square-foot (4,262.8 m^{2}) office in 405 Howard Street.

==== Online slots games ====
First-party

- 3 Reel Hold up
- Arabian Riches
- Banana Rama Deluxe
- Battleship Search and Destroy
- Bitten
- Captain Quid's Treasure Quest
- Captain Jackpot's Cash Ahoy
- Cats
- Cleopatra
- Cleopatra 2
- Coyote Moon
- DaVinci Diamonds
- Davinci Diamonds Dual Play
- Diamond Queen
- Double Diamond
- Enchanted Unicorn
- Fire Opals
- Five Times Pay
- Grand Monarch
- Jackpot Jewels
- Kitty Glitter
- Lil' Lady
- Maltese Fortune
- Multi-Slot Jackpot Extreme
- Noah's Ark
- Pet's Pay Day
- Pharaoh's Fortune
- Pixies of the Forest
- Rainbow Riches Win Big Shindig
- Siberian Storm
- Super Hoot Loot
- Texas Tea
- The 50000 Pyramid
- The 100000 Pyramid
- Treasures of Troy
- Triple Fortune Dragon
- Vacation USA
- Vegas, Baby
- White Orchid
- Wild Wolf
- Wolf Run

Third-party

- Back To The Future
- Cluedo Who Won It
- Deal or No Deal
- Dungeons and Dragons Crystal Cavern
- Dungeons and Dragons Fortress of Fortune
- Elvis A Little More Action
- Elvis Multi Strike
- Elvis Top 20
- Jeopardy!
- Monopoly Here and Now
- Monopoly Multiplier
- Monopoly Pass Go
- Monopoly You're In the Money
- Star Trek
- Star Trek Against All Odds
- The War of the Worlds
- Transformers Ultimate Payback
- Wheel of Fortune Hollywood Edition
- Wheel of Fortune Triple Action Frenzy

==== Online table games ====
- Baccarat
- Caribbean Stud Poker
- Texas Hold 'Em Bonus
- Texas Hold 'Em Shootout
- Three Card Second Chance
- Wan Doy Pairs Poker
- 21+3 Blackjack
- Blackjack
- European Blackjack
- Hot Streak Blackjack
- Power Blackjack
- Vegas Blackjack with 21+ Bonus
- Three Wheel Roulette
- Double Bonus Spin Roulette
- Grande Roulette
- Hot Streak Roulette
- Pinball Roulette
- Triple Bonus Spin Roulette

Power Blackjack and Three Card Second Chance are unique to IGT online casinos. Three Card Second Chance was developed by gaming consultant and casino game analyst Michael Shackleford also known as 'The Wizard of Odds'.
