= International Game Technology =

London-headquartered gaming company

International Game Technology PLC
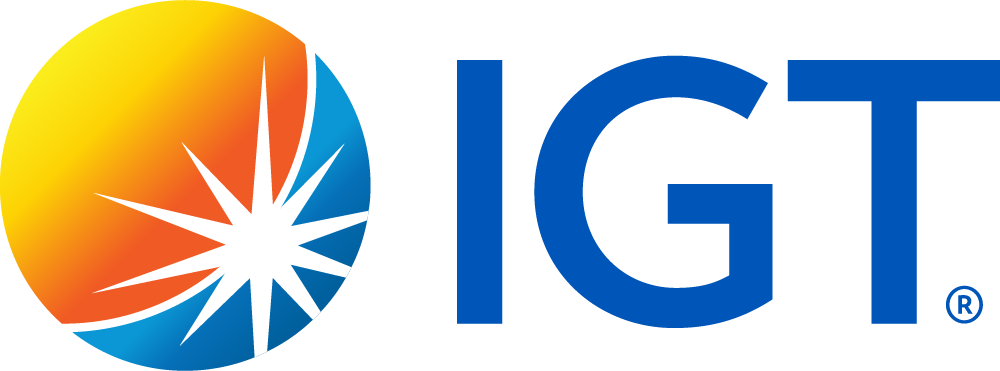

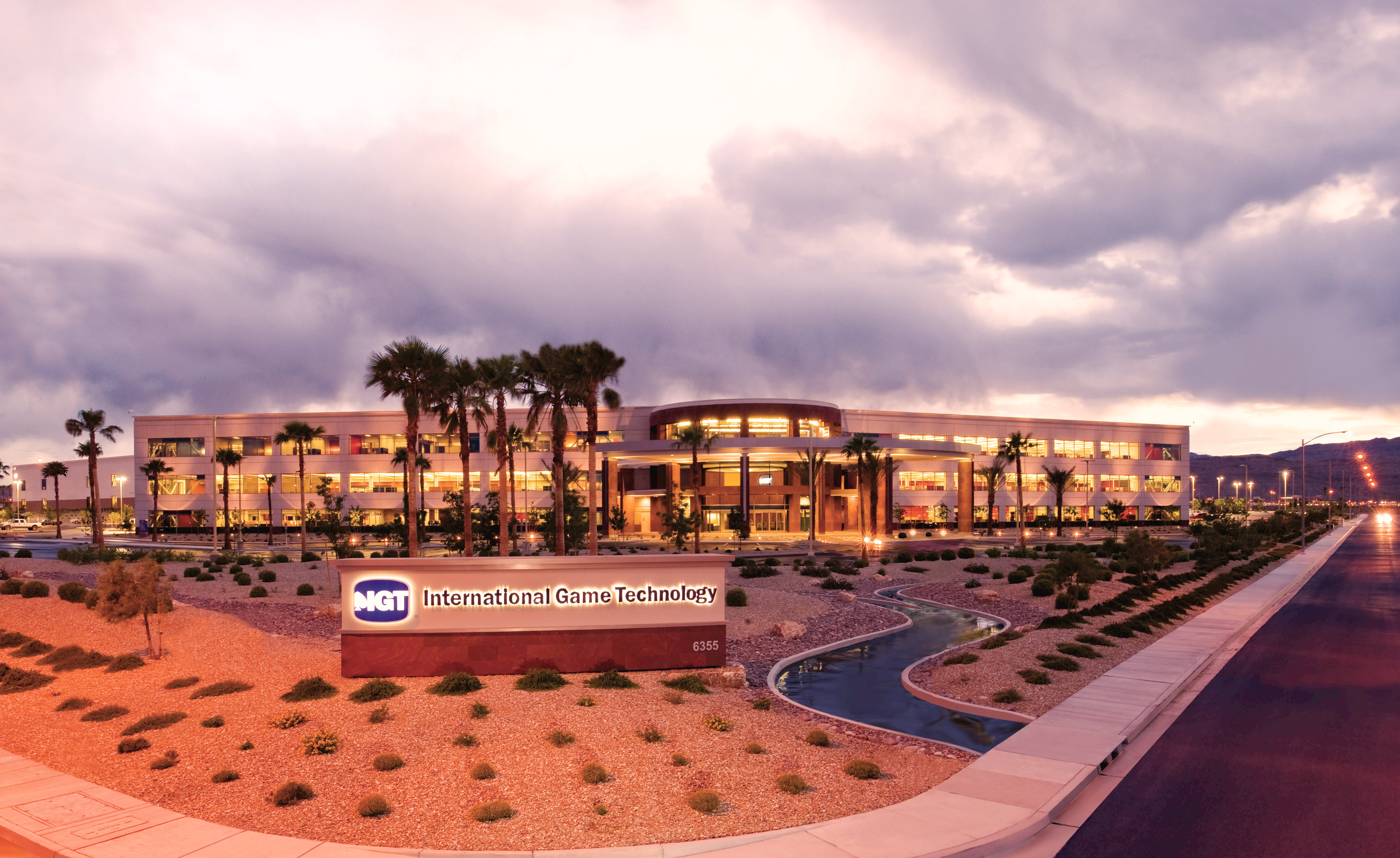
- IGT headquarters in Las Vegas, Nevada.
- Type: Public
- Traded as: NYSE: IGT; Russell 2000 component
- Industry: Gambling
- Founded: 1980; 46 years ago as GTech; 1990; 36 years ago (as Lottomatica)
- Headquarters: London, England (HQ): Las Vegas, Nevada (Operating offices); Reno, Nevada (Production location); Providence, Rhode Island (Operating offices); Rome, Italy (Operating offices)
- Key people: Vincent L. Sadusky (CEO); Marco Sala (chairman)
- Products: Slot machines; Lotteries; Gaming technology
- Revenue: ▼US$3.115 billion (2020)
- Operating income: ▼US$-0.107 billion (2020)
- Net income: ▼US$-0.838 billion (2020)
- Total assets: ▼US$12.992 billion (2020)
- Total equity: ▼US$1.561 billion (2020)
- Owner: Apollo Global Management; De Agostini
- Number of employees: 12,000 (2015)
- Subsidiaries: IGT Global Services Limited (IGT Global); IGT Global Solutions Corporation (IGT Solutions)
- Website: igt.com

International Game Technology PLC (IGT), formerly Gtech S.p.A. and Lottomatica S.p.A., is a multinational gambling company that produces slot machines and other gambling technology. The company is headquartered in London, with offices in Rome, Providence, Rhode Island, and Las Vegas. It is controlled, with a 42 percent stake, by De Agostini, which had acquired a majority stake in Lottomatica in 2002.

The company began in Italy as Lottomatica. It acquired Gtech Corporation in 2006, with its long history of scandals, and then changed its own name to Gtech in 2013. In 2015, the company acquired American gambling company International Game Technology and again adopted the acquired company's name as its own.

In 2025, the company spun-off its gaming division for a merger with Everi, with the new gaming entity majority-acquired by Apollo Global Management, while De Agostini Group retains a minority stake in the new company, which will also acquire the International Game Technology (IGT) name. IGT's remaining lottery business was renamed Brightstar Lottery following the transaction, continuing to trade on the NYSE under the new call letters NYSE: BRSL.

== History ==
The company began as Consorzio Lottomatica, an Italian lottery operator. De Agostini, a family-owned conglomerate in Italy, acquired a majority stake in Lottomatica in 2002.

In 2006, Lottomatica acquired Gtech Corporation, a Rhode Island-based lottery and gaming technology company, which it ran as a U.S. subsidiary, changing its name to Gtech S.p.A. in 2013.

IGT was listed as a creditor in 2014, when Atlantic City casino owner Trump Entertainment Resorts declared its fourth bankruptcy.

In April 2015, Gtech acquired American company International Game Technology (1975–2015), the world's largest slot machine manufacturer, for $6.4 billion, including $4.7 billion in cash and $1.7 billion in assumed debt. The companies combined under a new holding company based in the United Kingdom, and the Gtech name was replaced International Game Technology.

The company was fined $500,000 by the United States Securities and Exchange Commission (SEC) under the Dodd-Frank Act in 2016, for having illegally fired an internal whistleblower after the employee reported financial statements irregularities to senior management.

In April 2017, IGT announced an agreement to sell its subsidiary Double Down Interactive LLC To DoubleU Games as a means to establish a partnership in the social casino market.

In 2017 GTECH operated jackpots in 100 countries, while continuing to be "the subject of controversies stretching back decades."

In February 2022, IGT announced their expansion into Washington state via a multi-year deal with the Kalispel tribe.

In March 2022, International Gaming Technology's subsidiary IGT Global Services announced their six-year partnership agreement with Singapore Pools Limited.

In April 2022, International Games Technology announced their deal to acquire igaming content provider iSoftBet for approximately €160 million.

In February 2024 the company announced it would spin-off its non-lotto businesses tax-free, and then immediately merge the new entity with Everi. Apollo Global Management subsequently announced its plan to purchase the newly formed entity. The remaining lotto business would assume a name different than IGT, with IGT changing its name, and continuing to trade on the NYSE under a new ticker symbol, and the merged gaming entity acquiring the International Gaming Technology (IGT) name. The newly expanded IGT will remain based in Las Vegas, to be led by IGT CEO Vince Sadusky, with a new CEO to be appointed to lead the former IGT entity.

The agreement was formalized that July 26, pending regulatory approvals. After Apollo stepped in to acquire the merging company, Sadusky was ousted. and, in December 2024, it was announced that CEO Hector Fernandez would resign from Aristocrat Gaming to become CEO of the newly re-formed International Games Technology, following the gaming division merger with Everi. Sadusky will lead the remaining spun-off lottery operations business, under its new name. De Agostini is to retain a minority stake in the expanded company.

== Lawsuits, investigations and controversy ==
=== "Wheel-of-Fortune" slots class-action, 2025 ===
A class action lawsuit was filed in the Nevada U.S. District Court against IGT and several casino companies on November 21, 2024, alleging that IGT's Wheel of Fortune-themed slot machines are rigged, and that the company, along with complicit casino operators, defrauds participants.

=== Texas Lottery ===
First as GTECH, and subsequently as IGT, the company has operated Texas Lottery since its launch in 1992. In 2012, the company's contract was estimated at about $100 million annually, making GTECH the fourth-largest vendor to the state of Texas.

On February 14, 2025, International Game Technology subsidiary IGT Solutions was named in a class-action lawsuit alleging that defendants had "manipulated the Texas Lottery system to ensure a fraudulent win in the April 22, 2023, Lotto Texas drawing", allowing a foreign criminal organization to claim a $57.7 million lottery prize. Members of the Texas Lottery Commission were later grilled by the Texas Senate Finance Committee, alleging their possible facilitation of money laundering amid a "long-running fraud scheme".

On February 27, 2025, campaign finance records revealed Texas Lottery Commission alleged contract violations by IGT Solutions Corporation, which is barred from political donations in Texas. According to Transparency USA, IGT has donated over $280,000 to several of the state's political caucuses since 2015, to directly and indirectly influence state policymakers; funding a 2017 inauguration event concert for then-Governor Rick Perry; and acting as a title sponsor for Texas Governor Greg Abbott's February 2025 State of the State address. The Texas Lottery Commission determined that IGT's contributions to state legislative caucuses are a violation of contractual language that forbids a party to "knowingly make a gift, loan or political contribution, either directly or indirectly, to any Texas State Officer or a member of the Texas State Legislature", and levied a $180,000 fine against the company. IGT disagreed with TLC's interpretation of this contract provision and filed a request for declaratory relief, asking the court for clarity on the contractual language in question.

Abbott, whose staff has included current and former IGT lobbyists, directed the commission to ignore the legislature's 2024 instruction to ban lottery ticket resellers. On February 28, the Texas Senate voted to ban all reseller services from participating in the purchase of lottery tickets.
