= Gilder =

Gilder is a surname. It may refer to:

- Bob Gilder (born 1950), professional golfer
- Eric Gilder (1911–2000), English musicologist
- Gary Gilder (born 1974), South African cricketer
- George Gilder (born 1939), American writer and political activist
- Jeannette Leonard Gilder (1849–1916), journalist
- Joseph Benson Gilder (1858–1936), journalist
- Nick Gilder (born 1951), Canadian musician
- Richard Gilder (1932–2020), American investor, cofounder of Club for Growth
- Richard Watson Gilder (1844–1909), American poet and editor
- Sean Gilder (born 1964), English stage, film and screen actor
- Trey Gilder (born 1985), American professional basketball player
- Virginia Gilder (born 1958), American rower
- William Henry Gilder (explorer) (1838–1900), American journalist, soldier, and explorer

== See also ==
- Van Gilder (disambiguation)
