= Critic (disambiguation) =

A critic is a person who criticizes, i.e., offers reasoned judgement or analysis, value judgement, interpretation, or observation.

Critic or Criticism may also refer to:

- Critique, systematic inquiry into the conditions and consequences of a concept
- Literary criticism, study, evaluation, and interpretation of literature
- Opposition Critic, member of the Shadow Cabinet of the Canadian government

== Publications ==
- Critique: Journal of Socialist Theory, a socialist magazine
- Critique (French journal), philosophical journal founded by Georges Bataille
- Middle East Critique. journal for critical studies of the Middle East
- Immanuel Kant's books:
  - Critique of Pure Reason or First Critique
  - Critique of Practical Reason
  - Critique of Judgement
- The Critic (1881–1906), an American literary magazine founded by Jeannette Leonard Gilder and Joseph Benson Gilder and merged into Putnam's Magazine
- Critic (magazine), the University of Otago's (Dunedin, New Zealand) student magazine.
- The Critic (Adelaide) (1897–1924), a South Australian weekly arts and society magazine
- The Critics, List of Viz comic strips

== See also ==
- The Critic (disambiguation)
