= Gilder (disambiguation) =

Gilder is a surname.

Gilder may also refer to:

- Gilder, Iran, a village in East Azerbaijan Province, Iran
- Gilder, a craftsperson who performs gilding
- Gilder, a character in the video game Skies of Arcadia

== See also ==
- Guilder
- Van Gilder (disambiguation)
