= William Henry Gilder =

William Henry Gilder may refer to:

- William Henry Gilder (explorer) (1838–1900), American soldier, journalist, explorer and writer
- William Henry Gilder (clergyman) (1812–1864), his father, Methodist clergyman
