= Rosamond Gilder =

American theater critic

Janet Rosamond de Kay Gilder
- Born: 17 July 1891; Marion, MA
- Died: 5 September 1986 (aged 95); New York City, NY
- Occupation: Theater critic
- Known for: International Theater Institute Cofounder
- Parents: Richard Watson Gilder (father); Sarah Helena de Kay Gilder (mother)
- Relatives: William Henry Gilder (pateneral grandfather); George Coleman de Kay (maternal grandfather)
- Awards: Tony Award (1848); Guggenheim Fellowship (1950)

Janet Rosamond de Kay Gilder (17 July 1891 - 5 September 1986), also known as Rosamond Gilder, was an American theater critic.

== Biography ==
Gilder was born 17 July 1891 in Marion Massachusetts, daughter of poet-writer Richard Watson Gilder and Sarah Helena de Kay Gilder. She is a granddaughter of the American religious figure William Henry Gilder. She is also a granddaughter of the famous naval officer George Coleman de Kay. She was raised in New York City in artistic surroundings, and met such figures as Mark Twain, Jacob Riis, and Eleonora Duse. She began contributing articles to Theatre Arts Monthly during the 1920s, and joined its staff in 1936. Ten years later she succeeded Edith Isaacs in its editorship. In 1947 she was one of the founders of the International Theater Institute, in which role she promoted the idea of sending American theater companies to tour abroad. She was elected president of its American arm in 1963, remaining in the post until 1969. She spearheaded the production of numerous theatrical publications, and published articles and books on dramatic subjects as well.

Gilder received a Tony Award in 1948 and a Guggenheim Fellowship in 1950. In 1964 she was enrolled in the French Ordre des Arts et des Lettres. A selection of her papers are held at the New York Public Library.

Gilder died 5 September 1986 in New York City.
