= Helena de Kay Gilder =

American illustrator and artist (1946–1916)

Sarah Helena de Kay Gilder
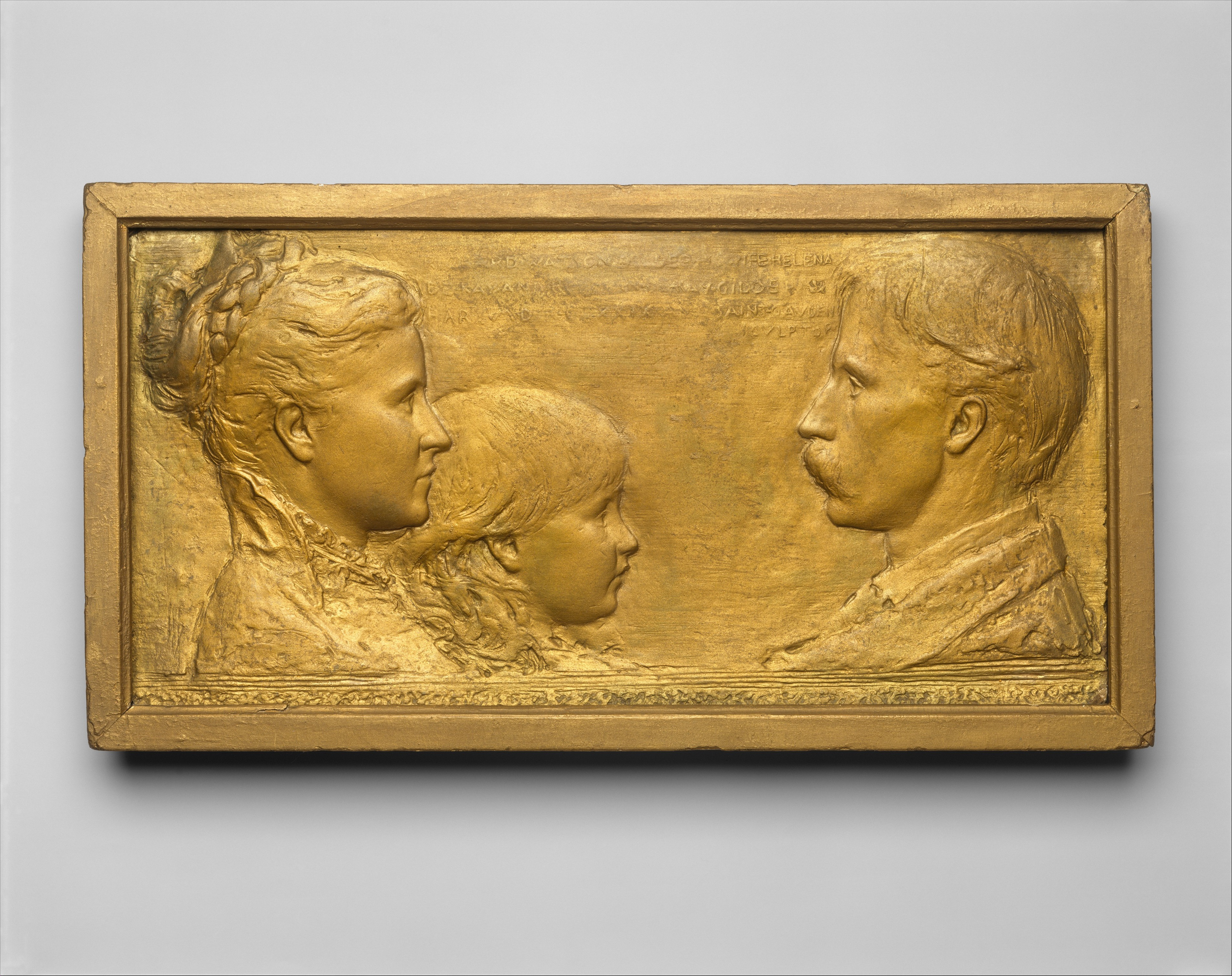
- Richard Watson Gilder, Helena de Kay Gilder, and Rodman de Kay Gilder
- Born: 14 January 1846; New York City, NY
- Died: 28 May 1916 (aged 70); New York City, NY
- Education: Cooper Union
- Occupation: Painter
- Spouse: Richard Watson Gilder (m. 1874; died 1909)
- Children: seven, including: Helena Marion de Kay Gilder; George de Kay Gilder; Rodman de Kay Gilder; Janet Rosamond de Kay Gilder; Dorothea de Kay Gilder; Helena Francesca de Kay Gilder
- Parents: George Coleman De Kay (father); Janet Halleck Drake (mother)
- Relatives: George Gilder (great-grandson)

Sarah Helena de Kay Gilder (14 January 1846 – 28 May 1916) was an American painter, illustrator, and cultural tastemaker from New York City.

== Early life and education ==
Sarah Helena de Kay Gilder (also known as Helena de Kay Gilder after her marriage) was born in New York City in 1846. She was the daughter of George Coleman de Kay and Janet Halleck de Kay (nee Drake), and granddaughter of the poet Joseph Rodman Drake. Her father was a naval officer who died when she was only two years old. After her father's death, her mother moved her and her brother, Charles, to Dresden Germany where they lived until 1861, before moving back to the United States so her mother could be closer to her older sister Katherine after she became a mother. She was then enrolled in a girl's boarding school located in Farmington, Connecticut.

She studied art at the Cooper Union Institute as well as at the National Academy of Design in the 1870s, during the first years that life classes were open to women. She also as studied privately with artists Winslow Homer, John La Farge and Albert Pinkham Ryder.

== Marriage and children ==
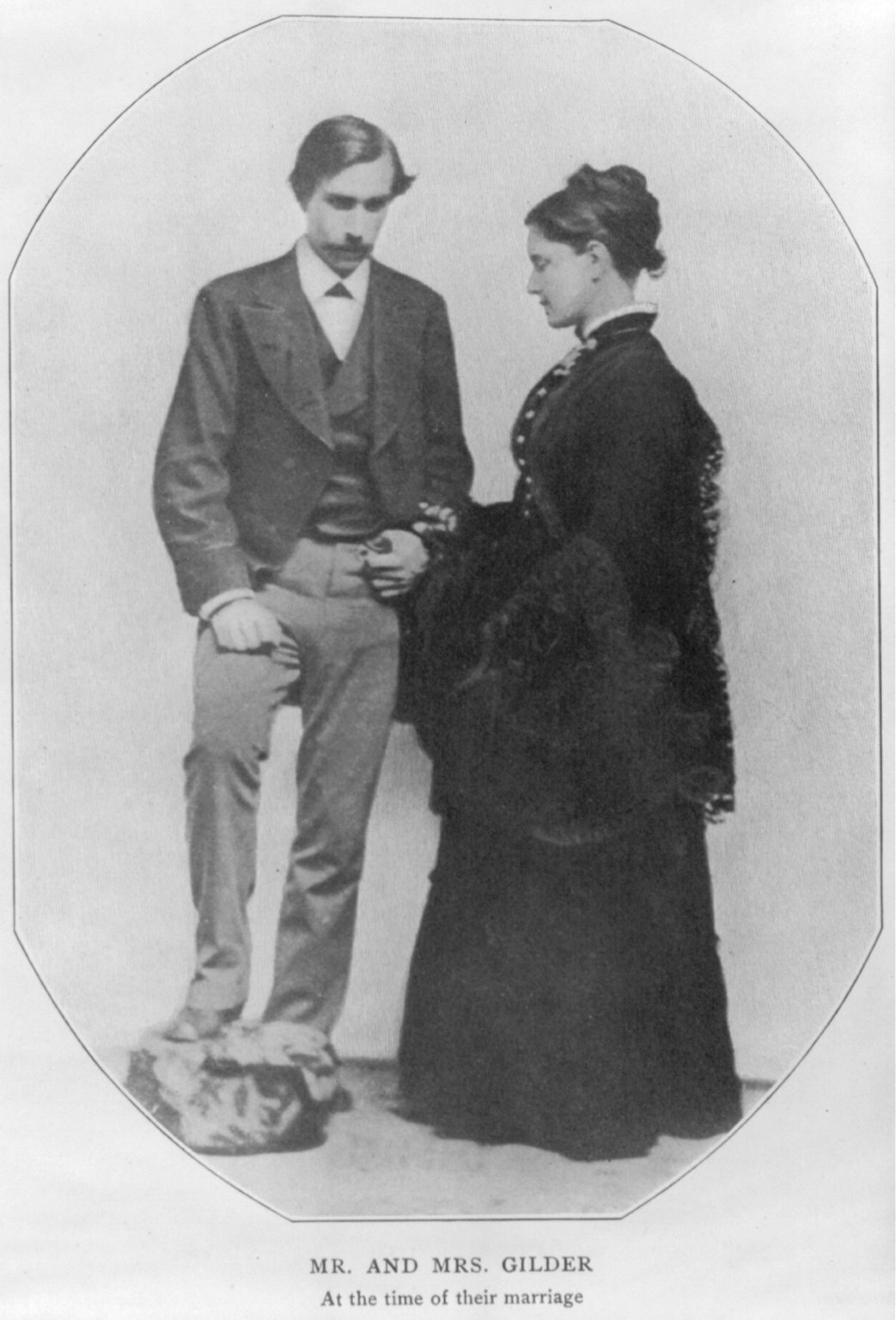
Mr. and Mrs. Gilder at the time of their marriage

In May 1872, Helena met her husband, Richard Watson Gilder, in the offices of Scribner's Monthly, where Richard was then working as a managing editor. In February 1874, Helena and Richard announced their engagement, and by June of that year they were married. Winslow Homer gave de Kay a portrait he painted of her as a wedding gift, inscribed with her wedding date in the lower right hand corner. In 1884, the artist John La Farge created a stained glass panel to commemorate the Gilder's tenth wedding anniversary. It was later refashioned as a firescreen during a remodel of their house by friend and architect Stanford White.

Richard is best known for his work as the editor of The Century Magazine and as a poet. Some of his works include The New Day (1875), Five Books of Song (1894), In the Heights (1905), and several more. Helena and Richard amassed a large number of letters in correspondence with each other over their marriage, and Helena was the subject of several love poems written by her husband.

The Gilders had seven children. Her son, Rodman de Kay Gilder, and her youngest daughter, Rosamond Gilder, were authors. Her daughter Dorothea de Kay Gilder was a subject of painter Cecilia Beaux and had a short career as a stage actress.

== Work ==
Gilder aspired to be an oil painter, and often did the accompanying illustrations for her husband's books of poetry, like Two Worlds: and Other Poems. Helena de Kay Gilder's best known work was cited as "her figure pictures, 'The Young Mother' and 'The Last Arrow' " by The Art Amateur. Her impact on the art world spread beyond her own art production. Gilder contributed to the art world by helping to organize the Arts Student League in 1875, and co-found the Society of American Artists in 1887 which provided primary younger classically artists with the opportunity to be a part of an alternative association. Her motivation for starting the organization occurred after she showed one painting at The National Academy of Design's annual show, while she was there as a student. Her painting received a poor location within the show and she felt her paintings location reflected the academy's reluctance to accept new types of art. The goal of the Society of American Artists was to move in a different direction than the National Academy and other conventional artists groups, while showing that art is valid in many different forms and styles, and can be left up to the artist. Along with Gilder, writers including Clarence Cook, Charles de Kay, Richard C. Brown, and her husband Richard Watson Gilder criticized the conservative mindset of the National Academy of Design.

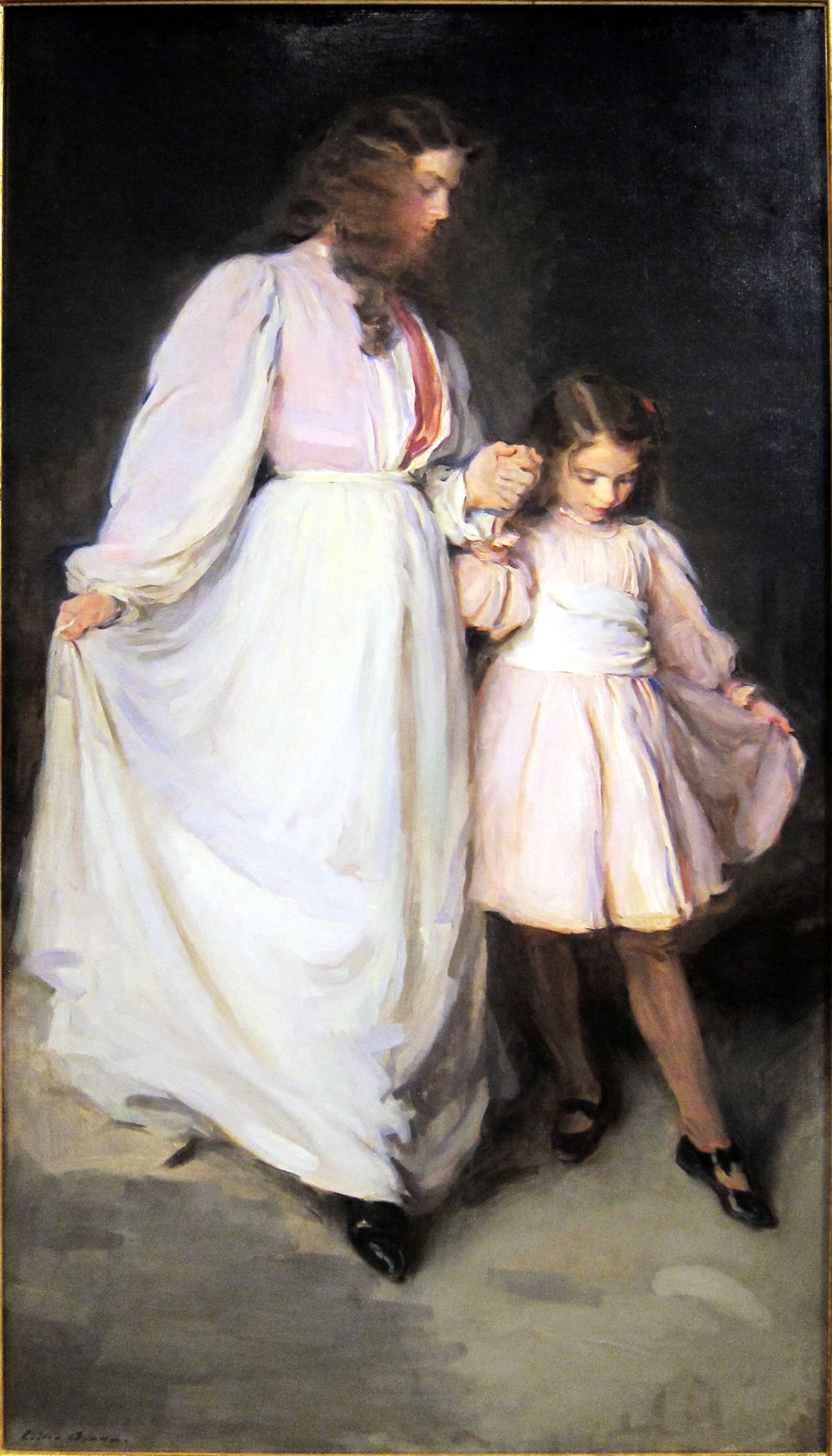
Dorothea and Francesca by Cecilia Beaux

== Cultivation of artists and portraiture ==
Helena and her family were the subjects of numerous portraits by several of close friends and artists, including Augustus Saint-Gaudens, Cecilia Beaux, and Winslow Homer.

== Relationship with Winslow Homer and Mary Hallock Foote ==
Helena de Kay Gilder is often known as a muse and romantic interest of Winslow Homer. It is thought that Gilder and Winslow may have met through her brother Charles, who had been connected to Winslow since 1867. He had stayed in studio in the University Building in New York City while Winslow was in France at the time. Gilder and Winslow spent a considerable amount of time together, and it is the correspondence through letters that have given indication that Winslow made multiple attempts to romantically pursue her. Though Homer is known to have painted several women in upscale resorts across the Northeast, Gilder is known to be one of the few that is nameable. Gilder is known to be the female subject in many of his works like The Butterfly (1872), as well as speculated to be the subject of other unconfirmed works by Homer.

One of Gilder's best known friendships was with illustrator Mary Hallock Foote. Though from very different social circles, and socioeconomic backgrounds, the two became close friends while they were students, and shared a lengthy correspondence throughout their lives. Gilder and Foote had large impacts on each other's careers as they both provided each other with critiques and feedback on their work, and Gilder's husband offered Foote several artistic commissions for his magazine. It was also through the Gilders that Foote was introduced to several other female artists and publishers at the time.

== Women's Right to Vote ==
Gilder believed that women were "men’s equal, and almost as well educated, as good and as intelligent in ordinary matters,” but opposed granting them the right to vote.

== Death ==
Helena de Kay Gilder died on 28 May 1916 at her home in New York City after an operation for appendicitis.
