= The Critic =

The Critic may refer to:

== Fictional characters ==
- Titular character of the comedy film criticism webseries Nostalgia Critic

== Film and television ==
- The Critic (1963 film), short animation by Ernest Pintoff and Mel Brooks
- The Critic (2019 film), American psychological thriller short film
- The Critic (2023 film), British thriller film
- "The Critic" (Plebs), 2018 television episode
- The Critic (TV series), 1994–1995 American animated TV series

== Magazines and newspapers ==
- The Critic (21st-century magazine), British monthly magazine founded in 2019
- The Critic (19th-century British magazine) (1843–1863), London publication
- The Critic (New York)
- The Critic (Adelaide) (1897–1924), South Australian weekly magazine
- The Critic (Hobart) (1904–1924), Tasmanian weekly newspaper

== Music ==
- "The Critic", 2003 song by Toby Keith from Shock'n Y'all

== Theater ==
- The Critic (play), 1779 satire by Richard Brinsley Sheridan
- The Critic (opera), by Charles Villiers Stanford based on the play

== See also ==
- Critic (disambiguation)
