= Society of American Artists =

American art group

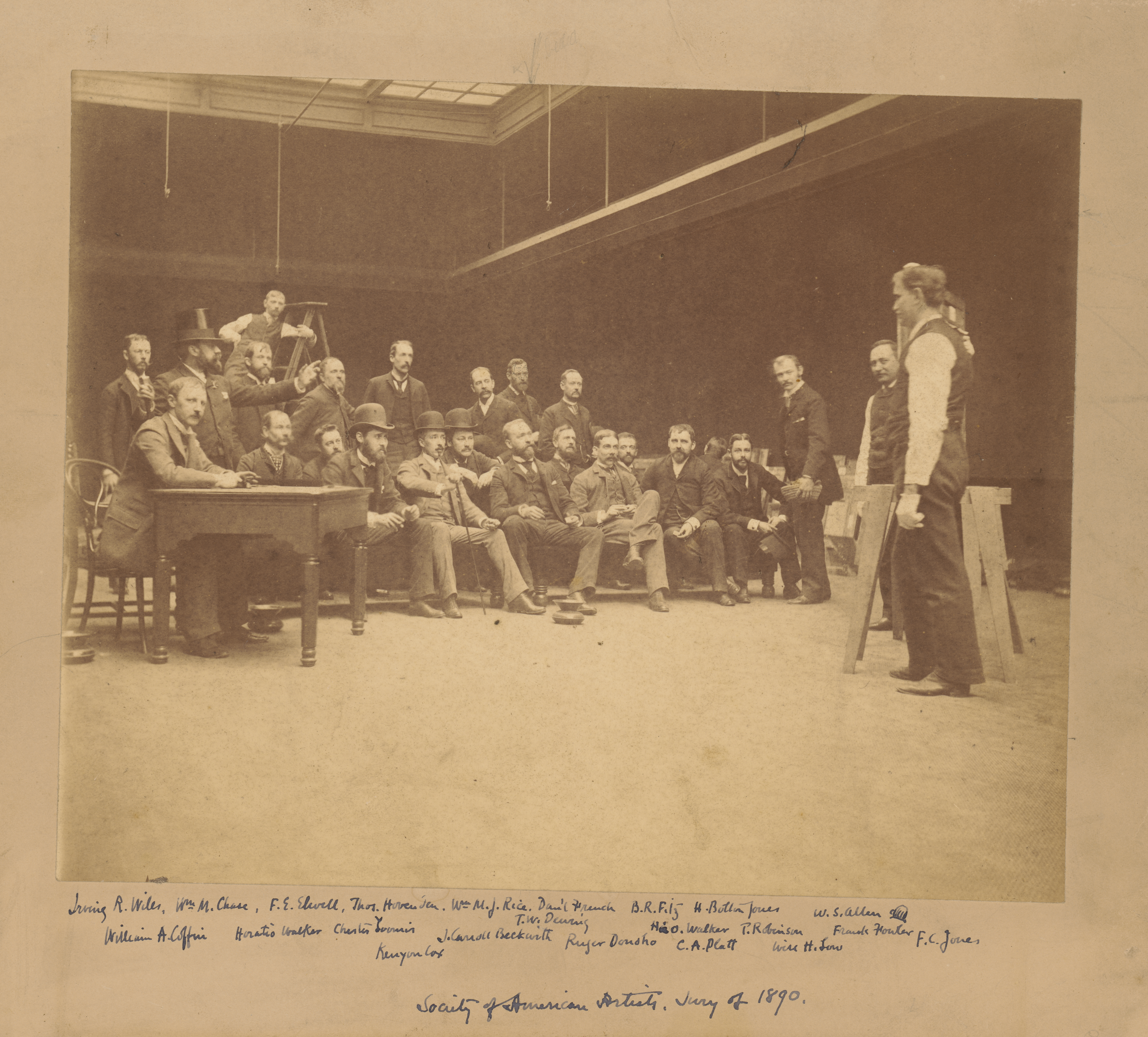
Society of American Artists, Jury of 1890

The Society of American Artists was an American artists group. It was formed in 1877 by artists who felt the National Academy of Design did not adequately meet their needs, and was too conservative.

The group began meeting in 1874 at the home of Richard Watson Gilder and his wife Helena de Kay Gilder. In 1877 they formed the Society, and subsequently held annual art exhibitions. Helena de Kay Gilder, one of the founders, started the group after showing one painting at The National Academy of Design's annual show, where she was a student, and receiving a poor location within the show. Helena de Kay Gilder felt her paintings location reflected the academy's reluctance to accept new types of art. The group received public support from Clarence Cook, a writer and art critic who wrote for the Daily Tribune, as well as Helena de Kay Gilder's brother, Charles de Kay who was an art columnist and editor of The New York Times. Journalists played a large role in helping to organize the group and spread its message of being a liberal alternative to traditional artist groups.

Some of the first members included sculptor Augustus Saint-Gaudens, whose work had been rejected from a National Academy exhibition in 1877; painters Walter Shirlaw, Robert Swain Gifford, Albert Pinkham Ryder, John La Farge, Julian Alden Weir, John Henry Twachtman, and Alexander Helwig Wyant; and designer and artist Louis Comfort Tiffany. In 1897, Laura Coombs Hills became the first miniature painter elected to the Society of American Artists (and one of very few women). Eventually most of the best-known artists of the day joined the group, and many held dual membership with the National Academy.

The cycle of conservative to progressive repeated in 1897 when the Ten American Painters group broke away from the Society of American Artists. The Society ultimately merged with the National Academy in 1906.

== See also ==
- National Academy of Design
- Art Students League
- Ten American Painters
