= William Henry Gilder (clergyman) =

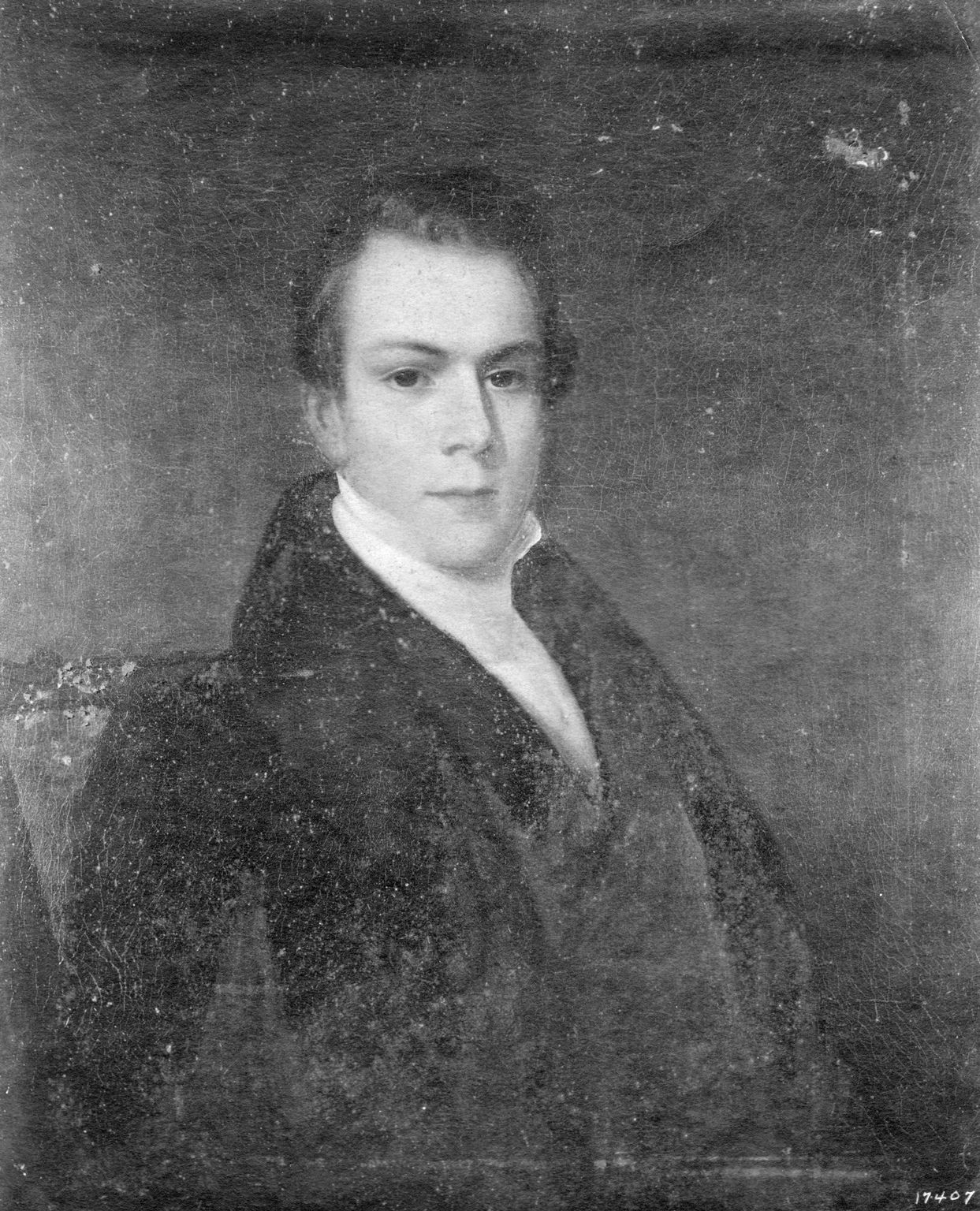

Personal life
- Born: September 17, 1812 Philadelphia, Pennsylvania, U.S.
- Died: April 13, 1864 (aged 51) Brandy Station, Virginia, U.S.
- Spouse: Jane Nutt
- Children: 11, including William, Richard, Jeannette, and Joseph
- Parent: John Gilder (father)
- Education: Wesleyan University
- Relatives: Janet Rosamond de Kay Gilder (granddaughter); George Franklin Gilder (great-great-grandson)

Religious life
- Religion: Methodism
- Ordination: 1836

William Henry Gilder (September 17, 1812 – April 13, 1864) was a Methodist clergyman.

== Biography ==
William Henry Gilder was born in Philadelphia, Pennsylvania. His father, John Gilder, laid the cornerstone of Girard College. The son was educated at Wesleyan University, became a preacher in the Methodist Church, and was afterward ordained. In 1836 he made an equestrian tour of the southern states, going as far as New Orleans. In 1840 he began the publication of the Philadelphia Repository, a literary monthly, but discontinued it at the end of a year. Subsequently he published for a few years in Philadelphia the Literary Register, a quarterly review. In 1842, he established Bellevue Female Seminary in Bordentown, New Jersey, which in 1848 he moved to Flushing, New York. In 1857 it was chartered as a college. He became chaplain of the 40th regiment of New York volunteers at the beginning of the civil war, and remained in active service until his death. He died in Brandy Station, Virginia in 1864.

== Family ==
He married Jane Nutt (1816–1885), daughter of Thomas and Lydia Nutt. Their eleven children (three of whom did not survive to adulthood) included:

- John Francis Gilder (1837), composer and pianist
- William Henry Gilder Jr (1838), an explorer
- Richard Watson Gilder (1844), a poet and editor
- Jeannette Leonard Gilder (1849), a journalist
- Martina Pintard Gilder Puron (1851)
- Almyra Gambault Gilder Cholmeley-Jones (1853)
- Robert Fletcher Gilder (1856), a journeyman and artist
- Joseph Benson Gilder (1858), an editor

Gilder's great-great-grandson George Franklin Gilder (1939–) became a prolific author and also a political speechwriter for some Republican political candidates including Richard Nixon.
