= Wealth and Poverty =

1981 non-fiction book by George Gilder

- Author: George Franklin Gilder
- Language: English
- Subject: philosophy of wealth and poverty
- Genre: nonfiction
- Publisher: Basic Books
- Publication date: 1 May 1981 (45 years ago)
- Publication place: United States
- Pages: 306 (first edition)
- ISBN: 978-0-465-09105-8
- OCLC: 6709177

Wealth and Poverty is a best-selling 1981 non-fiction book by investor and author George Gilder. A second edition was published in 2012.

== History ==
After completing Visible Man in the late 1970s Gilder began writing "The Pursuit of Poverty." In early 1981, Basic Books published (1 May 1981) (Note: ISBN-13 978-0-465-09105-8) the result as Wealth and Poverty. The book was an analysis of the roots of economic growth. Reviewing it within a month of the inauguration of the Reagan administration, the New York Times reviewer called it "A Guide to Capitalism" and wrote that it offered "a creed for capitalism worthy of intelligent people." The book was a New York Times bestseller and has sold over a million copies.

== Overview ==
In Wealth and Poverty, Gilder extended the sociological and anthropological analysis of his early books in which he had advocated for the socialization of men into service to women through work and marriage. He wove those sociological themes into the economic policy prescriptions of supply-side economics. The breakup of the nuclear family and demand-side economics led to poverty. Family and supply-side policies led to wealth.

In reviewing the problems of the immediate past (the inflation, recession, and urban problems of the 1970s) and proposing his supply-side solutions, Gilder argued for not only the practical but also the moral superiority of supply-side capitalism over the alternatives. "Capitalism begins with giving," he asserted, but New Deal liberalism created moral hazard. It was work, family, and faith that created wealth out of poverty: "It is this supply-side moral vision that underlies all the economic arguments of Wealth and Poverty.

In 1994, Gilder asserted that America has no poverty problem, the real problem is the "moral decay" of the "so-called poor," and their real need is "Christian teaching from the churches." He called the poor in America "the so-called poor," who have been "ruined by the overflow of American prosperity," and he asserted that they have more purchasing power than the middle class in Japan:

What the poor really need is morals.... The official poor in America have higher incomes and purchasing power than the middle class in the United States in 1955 or the middle class in Japan today. The so-called "poor" are ruined by the overflow of American prosperity. What they need is Christian teaching from the churches.... The poverty line in a rich country like the United States is a meaningless standard. We have no poverty problem strictly speaking, we have a desperate problem of family breakdown and moral decay.

Wealth and Poverty advanced a practical and moral case for supply-side economics and capitalism during the early months of the Reagan administration.
