= Charles DeKay =

American linguist, poet, critic, and fencer

Charles Augustus de Kay
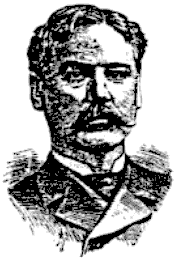
- Born: July 25, 1848; Washington, D.C., US
- Died: May 23, 1935 (aged 86); New York City, US
- Education: Yale
- Employer: The New York Times
- Spouse: Edwardlyn Coffey
- Children: 8

Charles Augustus de Kay (July 25, 1848 – May 23, 1935) was an American linguist, poet, critic, and fencer. He was a son of George Coleman De Kay, a naval officer.

He graduated from Yale College in 1868.

He was best known for founding the National Sculpture Society, the Authors' Club, the National Arts Club and the Fencers Club. He was inducted into the United States Fencing Hall of Fame in 2008. He was an art and literary critic for The New York Times for 18 years. He was a co-founder of the Circle of Friends of the Medallion.

He also wrote under the pseudonyms "Henry Eckford" and "Louis Barnaval".

In June 1894, he was nominated by Grover Cleveland to be Consul General at Berlin and took over the post shortly thereafter. In keeping with his lifelong love of fencing, he had the honor of opening the fencing club in Berlin while serving as Consul General.

He was buried in Saint George's Church Cemetery, Hempstead, New York.

== Writing ==
- The Bohemian (New York, 1878)
- Hesperus (1880)
- Vision of Nimrod (1881)
- Vision of Esther (1882)
- Love Poems of Louis Barnaval (1883).
- Bird Gods, with an accompaniment of decorations by George Wharton Edwards. New York : A.S. Barnes (1898).
- Life and Works of Barye
- Life and Works of Louis Comfort Tiffany

According to Appletons' Cyclopædia (1900), his best-known story is "Manmatha".

== See also ==
- List of USFA Hall of Fame members
