= Putnam's Magazine =

American monthly periodical (1853–1910)

Putnam's Monthly Magazine of American Literature, Science and Art
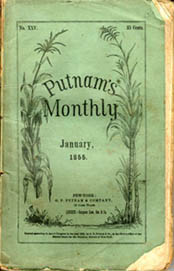
- Number 25, January 1855 (Vol. 5, No. 1)
- Frequency: Monthly
- Founder: George Palmer Putnam
- First issue: 1853
- Final issue: 1910
- Company: G. P. Putnam's Sons
- Country: United States
- Based in: New York, New York
- Language: English

Putnam's Monthly Magazine of American Literature, Science and Art was a monthly periodical published by G. P. Putnam's Sons featuring American literature and articles on science, art, and politics.

== Series ==
The magazine had three incarnations. Ten semiannual volumes of six issues were published from 1853 to 1857 (vols. 1–10) and six from 1868 to 1870 (vols. 1–6, second series). Cornell University Library numbers them consecutively, vols. 1–16. The 1906–1910 version restarts numbering at Volume 1.

=== 1853–1857 ===
First, it was edited by Charles Frederick Briggs from January 1853 to September 1857 (whereupon it merged with Emerson's United States Magazine); It was founded by George Palmer Putnam, who intended it to be a vehicle for publishing the best of new American writing; a circular that Putnam sent to prospective authors (including Herman Melville) announced that the magazine would be 'as essentially an organ of American thought as possible'. Putnam saw an opportunity to create a magazine that would compete with the successful Harper's New Monthly Magazine, which drew much of its content from British periodicals. As publishing only American writing would distinguish Putnam's from Harper's and give the former unique status in the marketplace, Ezra Greenspan has argued that the magazine's literary nationalism was ‘a shrewd mixture of ideological altruism and publishing acumen’. Frederick Law Olmsted and George William Curtis served as its owners and editors in its final two years.

=== 1868–1870 ===
Edited by C. F. Briggs, Edmund Clarence Stedman and Parke Godwin from January 1868 to November 1870, whereupon it merged with Scribner's Monthly.

=== 1906–1910 ===
The 1853 Putnam's Magazine was revived as Putnam's Monthly and merged with The Critic, which started publication in 1881 (or 1884?), and had been issued by Putnam's since 1898. The name of the merged publication was Putnam's Monthly and the Critic.

It was edited by Jeannette Gilder and Joseph Gilder from October 1906 to April 1910, known as The Critic and Literary World, when it merged with the Atlantic Monthly.
