= George Coleman De Kay =

American sailor

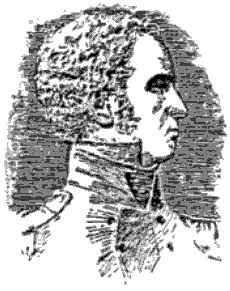
- Born: New York City
- Died: 31 January 1849; Washington, D.C.
- Occupation: Naval officer
- Spouse(s): Janet Halleck Drake
- Children: Helena de Kay Gilder, Charles DeKay
- Relatives: James Ellsworth De Kay

George Coleman de Kay (1802 New York City – 31 January 1849 Washington, D.C.) was a naval officer. He was buried at St George's Church cemetery, Hempstead, New York.

== Biography ==
He was prepared for college, but ran away to sea. He became a skillful navigator, and took vessels built by Henry Eckford to South America. He volunteered in the navy of the Argentine Republic, then at war with Brazil, and was given command of a brig in June 1827. After taking several prizes, he accepted a captain's commission, which he had declined on entering the service, preferring to win it by promotion. In an engagement with the brig “Cacique,” commanded by Capt. Manson, that vessel was captured, though twice the size of de Kay's, and much more heavily armed. When returning to Buenos Aires in June 1828, his brig, the “Brandsen,” was driven inshore in the Rio Plata by a Brazilian squadron. He scuttled the vessel to prevent her capture, swam ashore with his crew, and on reaching Buenos Aires was made commodore.

After the peace, he delivered a corvette to the Ottoman Porte for Henry Eckford. He was with him in Constantinople when he died, Eckford at the time being superintendent of the Ottoman shipyards. Returning to New York, de Kay married in 1833 Janet, only child of Joseph Rodman Drake, the poet. In 1847 he took the U. S. frigate Macedonian to Ireland with supplies for the sufferers from the famine, having exerted himself to secure the passage of an act of Congress permitting a government vessel to be so employed.

== Family ==
His brother was the naturalist James Ellsworth de Kay. George de Kay's son was the poet Charles Augustus de Kay. George de Kay's daughter, Helena de Kay Gilder, an artist, married Richard Watson Gilder, an editor, poet and political activist.
