= Van Gilder =

Van Gilder may refer to:

- Laura Van Gilder (born 1964), American cyclist
- Van Gilder Hotel, historic building in Seward, Alaska, United States
