= Jeannette Leonard Gilder =

American novelist

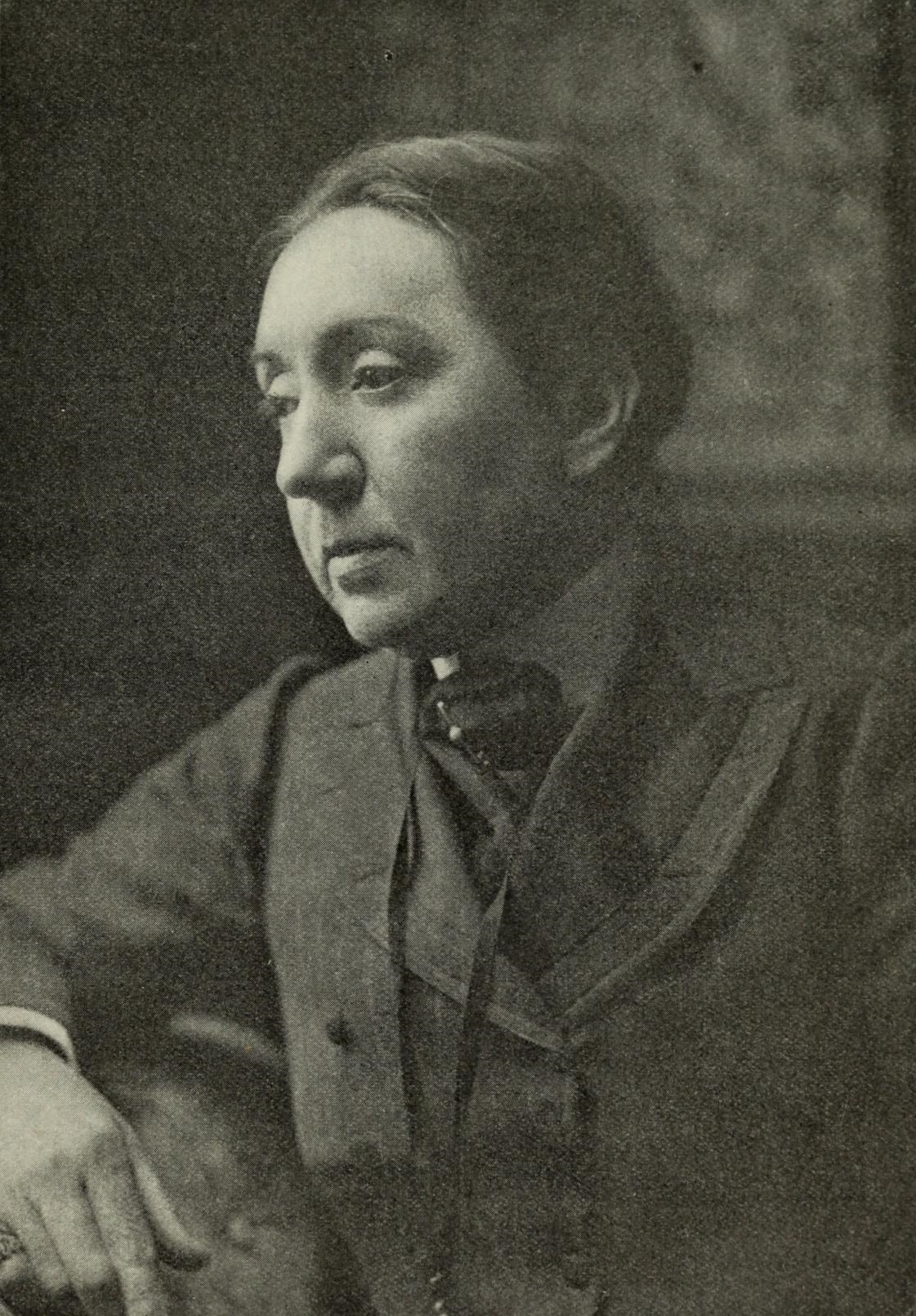
- Born: October 3, 1849; Flushing, New York, U.S.
- Died: January 17, 1916 (aged 66); New York, New York, U.S.
- Education: St. Thomas Hall
- Occupations: Author; journalist; critic; editor
- Relatives: Richard Watson Gilder, Joseph Benson Gilder, William Henry Gilder (brothers)
- Writing career
- Pen name: Brunswick
- Language: English
- Genre: Novels

Jeannette Leonard Gilder (pen name, Brunswick; October 3, 1849 – January 17, 1916) was an American author, journalist, critic, and editor. She served as the regular correspondent and literary critic for Chicago Tribune, and was also a correspondent for the Boston Saturday Evening Gazette, Boston Transcript, Philadelphia Record and Press, and various other papers. She was the author of Taken by Siege; Autobiography of a Tomboy; and The Tomboy at Work. Gilder was the editor of Representative Poems of Living Poets (with her brother, Joseph Benson Gilder); Essays from the Critic (with Helen Gray Cone); Pen Portraits of Literary Women; and The Heart of Youth, an anthology; as well as the owner and editor of The Reader: An Illustrated Monthly Magazine.

== Early years and education ==
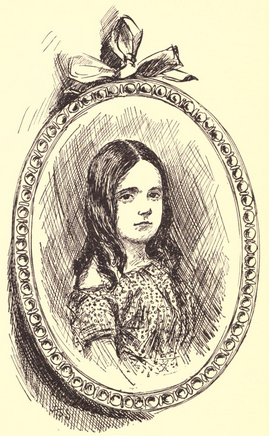
Gilder as a young girl

Jeannette Leonard Gilder was born in Flushing, New York, October 3, 1849. She was a daughter of the clergyman William Henry Gilder, who died when she was fifteen; and Jane (Nutt) Gilder. Her siblings included, Richard Watson Gilder, Joseph Benson Gilder, and William Henry Gilder.

Gilder was educated at St. Thomas Hall (woman's collegiate), conducted by her father; and studied at a boarding school in South Jersey for a year or two. Her schooling end at the age of fifteen.

== Career ==
Disliking the occupational options commonly open to women, she instead started working as a researcher for a historian during the Civil War before turning to the periodical industry. From 1869, she was connected with various newspapers in Newark and New York. She began newspaper work in the editorial department of the Newark, New Jersey Morning Register, then conducted by her brother, Richard, and was also the Newark reporter for New York Tribune. She was the New York correspondent of the Transcript; and also worked for the Boston Evening Transcript, where she used the pen name "Brunswick". Gilder became literary editor for Scribner's Monthly before becoming a drama and music critic for the New York Herald until 1880.

In Trenton, New Jersey, she was employed at the state adjutant general's office; in Philadelphia, Pennsylvania, at the US Mint; and in 1881, at Newark, New Jersey, she worked as a copyist of the registrar of deeds. In that same year, she and her brother Richard co-founded The Critic, a literary magazine, where she served as an editor from January 1881 to September 1906. Her editor role with The Critic was shared with her brother Joseph. When The Critic merged with Putnam's Monthly, she wrote a popular regular column for it called "The Lounger".

Gilder opposed women's right to vote. In an article titled "Why I Am Opposed to Woman Suffrage", printed in May 1894 in Harper's Bazaar, she argued that women were not strong enough to participate in politics. It would be "too public, too wearing, and too unfitted to the nature of women", she wrote. She further argued that women would find a "sufficiently engrossing 'sphere' in the very important work of training her children". Her novels include The Autobiography of a Tom-boy (1900) and The Tom-boy at Work (1904).

== Personal life ==
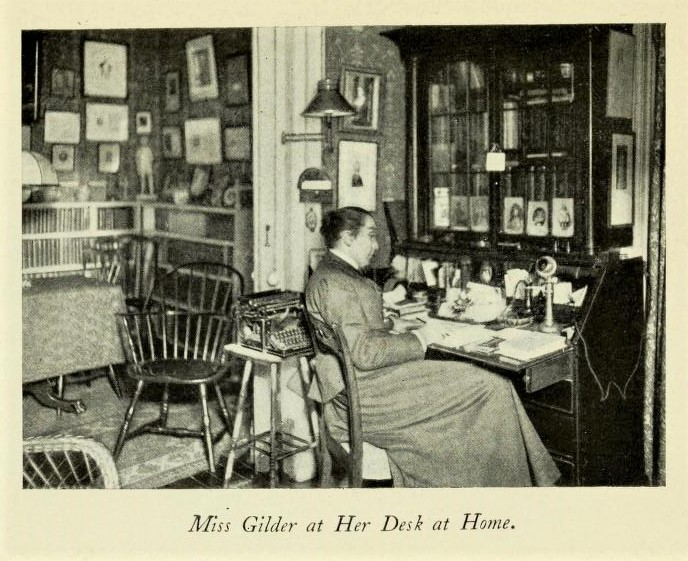
Gilder at her desk (1903)

Although she had no children of her own, Gilder took in four of her brother's children after their mother's death. She was a member of the Colony Club. Gilder died at her home in New York on January 17, 1916, at the age of 66, after a stroke brought on by a formation of a blood clot on the brain.

== Selected works ==
- Representative Poems by Living Persons (1886)
- Pen Portraits of Literary Women (1887)
- Essays from the Critic (1882)
- Authors at Home (1889)
- Why I am opposed to woman suffrage. Boston: Massachusetts Association Opposed to the Extension of Suffrage to Women, [1894?].
- The Autobiography of a Tom-boy. New York: Doubleday, Page, & Co. (1900)
- The Tom-boy at Work (1904)
