= William Henry Gilder (explorer) =

American soldier, journalist, explorer and writer

William Henry Gilder Jr (August 16, 1838 – February 5, 1900) was an American soldier, journalist, explorer and writer.

== Biography ==
He was born in Philadelphia, the son of a clergyman, also named William Henry Gilder. At the beginning of the Civil War, the younger Gilder enlisted in the 5th New York Infantry (Duryée's Zouaves), was transferred to the 40th New York, and was mustered out with the rank of captain and brevet major. During a large part of the war he served on the staff of Gen. Thomas W. Egan. He also acted as a war correspondent for Frank Leslie's Illustrated Newspaper.

From 1871 to 1877, he was managing editor of the Newark Register and from 1878 to 1880 was second in command on the expedition of Frederick Schwatka to King William Land in search of the relics of Sir John Franklin. This expedition was marked by the longest sledge journey on record at that time — 3,251 statute miles. He accompanied the De Long expedition on Rodgers under Captain Berry and, after the burning of the vessel on the western shore of Bering Strait, made a midwinter journey of nearly 2,000 miles (3,200 km) across Siberia to telegraph to the government the news of the disaster. He afterwards participated in the search for De Long in the Lena delta. In 1883, he was in Tongking as a war correspondent during the French-Annamese conflict and in 1884 visited the region of the earthquakes in Spain. On his expeditions and travels he was a correspondent of the New York Herald. He published Schwatka's Search: Sledging in the Arctic in Quest of the Franklin Records (1881) and Ice-Pack and Tundra (1883).

He was the brother of Richard Watson Gilder, Jeannette Leonard Gilder and Joseph Benson Gilder.
