= Joseph Benson Gilder =

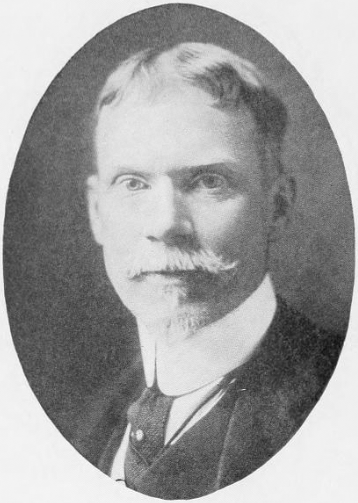
- Born: June 29, 1858; Flushing, New York, US
- Died: December 9, 1936 (aged 78); New York, New York, US
- Occupation: Editor
- Parents: William Henry Gilder (father); Jane Nutt Gilder (mother)
- Relatives: Richard Watson Gilder (brother); Jeannette Leonard Gilder (sister); William Henry Gilder (brother)

Joseph Benson Gilder (June 29, 1858 – December 9, 1936) was an American editor. He was the brother of Richard Watson Gilder and Jeannette Leonard Gilder and the explorer William Henry Gilder.

== Biography ==
Gilder was the son of the clergyman William Henry Gilder. He was born in Flushing, New York, studied two years at the United States Naval Academy, and for some time was engaged in newspaper work in Newark, New Jersey and New York City. In 1881, with his sister, he founded The Critic, of which he was coeditor until 1906 when publication of The Critic ended.

Gilder was literary advisor to the Century Company (1895–1902); helped organize the University Settlement House of New York; in 1902–04 was United States dispatch agent at London; and in 1910–11 was editor of The New York Times Review of Books.

He died at his home in Manhattan on December 9, 1936.

== Works ==
He edited:

- Essays from the Critic (1882) (with his sister)
- Authors at Home (1889)
- Andrew Carnegie's Gospel of Wealth (1900)
- James Russell Lowell's Impressions of Spain (1900)
- The American Idea (1902)
- Addresses of John Hay (1906)
