= George Gilder =

American writer (born 1939)

George Franklin Gilder
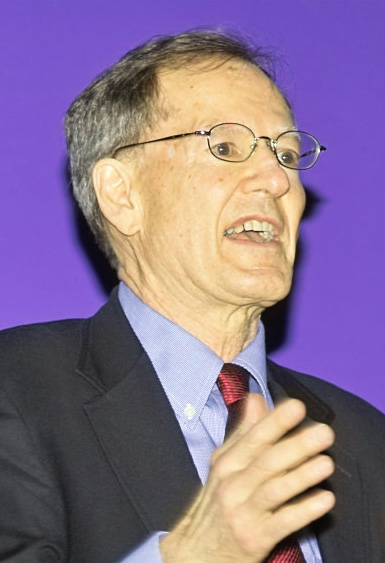
- Gilder in April 2005
- Born: November 29, 1939 (age 86); New York City, U.S.
- Education: Harvard University (BA)
- Occupations: Author and economist
- Known for: Discovery Institute Cofounder
- Notable work: Wealth and Poverty
- Title: Editor-in-Chief Gilder Technology Report; Chairman Gilder Publishing LLC; Senior Fellow Discovery Institute
- Spouse: Cornelia (Nini) Ewing Brooke (m. 1976)
- Parents: Richard Watson Gilder II (father); Anne Spring Denny Alsop (mother)
- Relatives: Richard Watson Gilder (great-grandfather)
- Military career
- Allegiance: United States of America
- Branch: U.S. Marine Corps

George Franklin Gilder (/ˈɡɪldər/; born November 29, 1939) is an American investor, author, economist, and co-founder of the Discovery Institute. His 1981 book, Wealth and Poverty, advanced a case for supply-side economics and capitalism during the early months of the Reagan administration. He is the chairman of George Gilder Fund Management, LLC.

== Early life and education ==
Gilder was born in New York City and raised in New York and Massachusetts. His father, Richard Watson Gilder II, was killed flying in the United States Army Air Forces in World War II when Gilder was two years old. He is a great-grandson of designer Louis Comfort Tiffany.

He spent most of his childhood with his mother, Anne Spring Denny (Alsop), and his stepfather, Gilder Palmer, on a dairy farm in Tyringham, Massachusetts. Palmer, a college roommate of his father, was deeply involved with his upbringing, as was the family of David Rockefeller, his godfather.

Gilder attended Hamilton School in New York City, Phillips Exeter Academy, and Harvard University, graduating in 1962. He later returned to Harvard as a fellow at the Harvard Institute of Politics, and edited the Ripon Forum, the newspaper of the liberal Republican Ripon Society.

== Marine Corps ==
Gilder served in the United States Marine Corps. (Note: Gilder anecdotally writes about his time in the Marine Corps in a Forbes magazine article.)

== Career ==
=== Speechwriting ===
In the 1960s Gilder served as a speechwriter for several prominent officials and candidates, including Nelson Rockefeller, George W. Romney, and Richard Nixon. He worked as a spokesman for the liberal Republican Senator Charles Mathias, as anti-war protesters surrounded the capital; some eventually scared Gilder out of his apartment. Gilder moved to Harvard Square the following year, and he became a writer who modeled himself after Joan Didion.

With his college roommate, Bruce Chapman, he wrote an attack on the anti-intellectual policies of the 1964 Republican presidential candidate Barry Goldwater, The Party That Lost Its Head (1966). He later recanted this attack: "The far Right — the same men I dismissed as extremists in my youth — turned out to know far more than I did. At least the 'right-wing extremists', as I confidently called them, were right on almost every major policy issue from welfare to Vietnam to Keynesian economics and defense — while I, in my Neo-Conservative sophistication, was nearly always wrong."

=== Supply-side economics ===
Supply-side economics was formulated in the mid-1970s by Jude Wanniski and Robert L. Bartley at The Wall Street Journal as a counterweight to the reigning "demand-side" Keynesian economics. At the center of the concept was the Laffer curve, the idea that high tax rates reduce government revenue.

Gilder wrote a book extending the ideas of his Visible Man (1978) into the realm of economics, to balance his theory of poverty with a theory of wealth. The book, published as the best-selling Wealth and Poverty in 1981, communicated the ideas of supply-side economics to a wide audience in the United States and the world.

Gilder also contributed to the development of supply-side economics when he served as Chairman of the Lehrman Institute's Economic Roundtable, as Program Director for the Manhattan Institute, and as a frequent contributor to Laffer's economic reports and the editorial page of The Wall Street Journal.

=== Technology ===
In the 1990s, he became an evangelist of technology and the Internet. He discussed emerging trends in several books and his newsletter, the Gilder Technology Report.

The first mention of the word "Digerati" on USENET occurred in 1992 and was referred to an article by Gilder in Upside magazine. His other books include Life After Television, a 1990 86-page book that predicted microchip "telecomputers" connected by fiberoptic cable would make broadcast-model television obsolete. The book in the Larger Agenda series, was also notable for being published by Whittle Direct Books (Whittle Communications), featuring full-page advertisements for the Federal Express company on every fifth page. Federal Express was the sole advertiser in at least the first 10 books of the under-100-pages book series.

Gilder wrote the books Microcosm, about Carver Mead and the CMOS microchip revolution; Telecosm, about the promise of fiber optics; and The Silicon Eye, about the Foveon X3 sensor, a digital camera imager chip. The book cover of the Silicon Eye reads, "How a Silicon Valley Company Aims to Make All Current Computers, Cameras, and Cell Phones Obsolete." The Foveon sensor has not achieved this goal and has not yet been used in cell phones.

Gilder is an investor in private companies and serves as the chairman of the advisory board in Israel-based ASOCS that he discovered during his research for Israel Test.

=== On women and feminism ===
In the early 1970s, Gilder wrote an article in the Ripon Forum defending President Richard Nixon's veto of a day-care bill sponsored by Senator Walter Mondale (D-Minnesota) and Senator Jacob Javits (R-New York). He was fired as editor as a result. To defend himself, he appeared on Firing Line. Gilder also appeared on The Dick Cavett Show on November 30, 1973. During the interview, female members of the audience interrupted the broadcast by shouting toward the stage; ultimately demanding of Cavett that they be allowed to read a prepared statement in opposition of Gilder's views. Actor Robert Shaw stated that although he agreed with some of Gilder's generalizations of women, it would be beneficial if Gilder were to "learn how to write a sentence."

Gilder moved to New Orleans and worked in the mornings for Ben Toledano, Republican candidate for the United States Senate in 1972 and the party's nominee for mayor of New Orleans in 1970. He also wrote Sexual Suicide (1973), which was revised and reissued as Men and Marriage (1986). The book achieved a succès de scandale and Time made Gilder "Male Chauvinist Pig of the Year."

=== Support for immigration ===
Gilder has praised mass immigration as an economic boon in both the US and Israel. Although Gilder's support for mass immigration is framed by high tech hubs such as Silicon Valley's need for computer programmers, he sees recent American immigration policy as being vital to American prosperity overall.

=== The American Spectator ===
Gilder bought the conservative political monthly magazine The American Spectator from its founder, Emmett Tyrrell, in the summer of 2000, switching the magazine's focus from politics to technology.

Experiencing his own financial problems in 2002, Gilder sold the Spectator back to Tyrrell.

=== Speaking engagements and editorial contributions ===
Gilder lectures internationally on economics, technology, education, and social theory. He has addressed audiences from Washington, D.C., to the Vatican, and he has appeared at conferences, public policy events, and media outlets.

== Wealth and Poverty ==
After completing Visible Man in the late 1970s, Gilder began writing "The Pursuit of Poverty." In early 1981, Basic Books published the result as Wealth and Poverty. It was an analysis of the roots of economic growth. Reviewing it within a month of the inauguration of the Reagan Administration, The New York Times reviewer called it "A Guide to Capitalism". It offered, he wrote, "a creed for capitalism worthy of intelligent people." The book was a New York Times bestseller, and eventually sold over a million copies.

In Wealth and Poverty, Gilder extended the sociological and anthropological analysis of his early books in which he had advocated for the socialization of men into service to women through work and marriage. He wove these sociological themes into the economic policy prescriptions of supply-side economics. In his eyes the breakup of the nuclear family and the policies of demand-side economics led to poverty, while family and supply-side policies led to wealth.

In reviewing the problems of the immediate past—the inflation, recession, and urban problems of the 1970s—and proposing his supply-side solutions, Gilder argued not just the practical but the moral superiority of supply-side capitalism over the alternatives. "Capitalism begins with giving," he asserted, while New Deal liberalism created moral hazard. It was work, family, and faith that created wealth out of poverty. "It is this supply-side moral vision that underlies all the economic arguments of Wealth and Poverty," he wrote.

In 1994, Gilder wrote that the poor in America are "ruined by the overflow of American prosperity" and "moral decay" and that they are in need of "Christian teaching from the churches."

== Intelligent design ==
In 1991 Gilder cofounded the Discovery Institute with Bruce Chapman. The organization became the leading thinktank of the intelligent design movement, with Gilder writing many articles for intelligent design and against the theory of evolution.

== Publications ==
=== Books ===
External videos
- Booknotes interview with Gilder on Microcosm, September 24, 1989, C-SPAN
- Presentation by Gilder on The Israel Test, October 3, 2011, C-SPAN
- Interview with Gilder on Wealth and Poverty, July 13, 2012, C-SPAN
- Interview with Gilder on Knowledge and Power, July 12, 2013, C-SPAN
- Interview with Gilder on The 21st Century Case for Gold, July 9, 2015, C-SPAN
- Interview with Gilder on The Scandal of Money, July 20, 2017, C-SPAN
- Interview with Gilder on Life After Google, July 12, 2018, C-SPAN
- Interview with Gilder on Gaming AI, July 21, 2021, C-SPAN
- Interview with Gilder on Gaming AI, September 29, 2021, C-SPAN
- Interview with Gilder on Life After Capitalism, July 14, 2022, C-SPAN

- The Party That Lost Its Head Alfred A. Knopf; 1st edition (1966). With Bruce Chapman.
- Sexual Suicide (1973)
- Naked Nomads: Unmarried Men in America (1974)
- Visible Man: A True Story of Post-Racist America (1978)
- Wealth and Poverty (1981)
- Men and Marriage (1986)
- The Spirit of Enterprise (1986)
- Microcosm: The Quantum Revolution In Economics And Technology (1989)
- Life After Television (1990)
- Recapturing the Spirit of Enterprise (1992)
- The Meaning of the Microcosm (1997)
- Telecosm: The World After Bandwidth Abundance (2000)
- The Silicon Eye: How a Silicon Valley Company Aims to Make All Current Computers, Cameras, and Cell Phones Obsolete (2005)
- The Silicon Eye: Microchip Swashbucklers and the Future of High-Tech Innovation (2006)
- The Israel Test (2009)
- Wealth and Poverty: A New Edition for the 21st Century (2012)
- Knowledge and Power: The Information Theory of Capitalism and How it is Revolutionizing our World (2013)
- The Scandal of Money (2016)
- Life after Google: The Fall of Big Data and the Rise of the Blockchain Economy (2018)
- Gaming AI: Why AI Can't Think but Can Transform Jobs (2020)
- Life after Capitalism: The Meaning of Wealth, the Future of the Economy, and the Time Theory of Money (2023)

=== Contributions by Gilder ===
- Gilder, George (2002). "Computer Industry". In David R. Henderson (ed.). Concise Encyclopedia of Economics (1st ed.). Library of Economics and Liberty. OCLC 317650570, 50016270, 163149563
